= Ōoku (disambiguation) =

Ōoku is a section of Edo Castle, Japan.

Ōoku may also refer to:

- Ōoku (2003 TV series), a Japanese TV series
- Ōoku (1983 TV series), a Japanese television series
- Oh! Oku, a 2006 film based on the TV series
- Ooku (album), a 2008 album by Masami Okui
- Ōoku: The Inner Chambers, a 2005 manga series by Fumi Yoshinaga
