= Ōoku: The Inner Chambers =

Japanese manga series

- First English edition of Ōoku: The Inner Chambers, as published by Viz Media

大奥 (Ōoku)
- Genre: Alternate history; Historical fantasy; Romance
- Manga
- Written by: Fumi Yoshinaga
- Published by: Hakusensha
- English publisher: NA: Viz Media
- Magazine: Melody
- Original run: June 28, 2004 – December 28, 2020
- Volumes: 19
- Live-action film
- Directed by: Fuminori Kaneko
- Written by: Natsuko Takahashi
- Studio: TBS, Asmik Ace
- Released: October 1, 2010
- Runtime: 116 minutes
- Television drama

Ōoku: Arikoto Iemitsu Hen
- Directed by: Fuminori Kaneko
- Written by: Yumiko Kamiyama
- Studio: TBS, Asmik Ace
- Original network: TBS
- Original run: October 2012 – December 2012
- Episodes: 10
- Live-action film

Ōoku: Emonnosuke Tsunayoshi Hen
- Directed by: Fuminori Kaneko
- Written by: Yumiko Kamiyama
- Studio: TBS, Asmik Ace
- Released: December 22, 2012
- Runtime: 124 minutes
- Television drama

Ōoku
- Directed by: Taku Ohara; Akihiro Tajima; Hideaki Kawano
- Produced by: Ryosuke Funada; Yasunori Matsuda
- Written by: Yoshiko Morishita
- Music by: Kohta Yamamoto
- Original network: NHK
- Original run: January 10, 2023 – March 14, 2023
- Episodes: 10
- Original net animation
- Directed by: Noriyuki Abe
- Produced by: Rui Kyo (executive); Takayuki Saitō (animation)
- Written by: Rika Takasugi
- Music by: Kenji Kawai
- Studio: Studio Deen
- Licensed by: Netflix
- Released: June 29, 2023
- Runtime: 26–80 minutes
- Episodes: 10

Ōoku: The Inner Chambers (大奥, Ōoku) is a Japanese manga series written and illustrated by Fumi Yoshinaga. It was serialized in Hakusensha's manga magazine Melody from June 2004 to December 2020, with its chapters collected in 19 tankōbon volumes. The manga is licensed in North America by Viz Media. Ōoku: The Inner Chambers follows an alternate history of early modern Japan in which an unknown disease kills most of the male population, leading to a matriarchal society in which the Ōoku becomes a harem of men serving the now female Shogun.

It was adapted into two live-action films in 2010 and 2012 and a 10-episode Japanese television drama series in 2012. Another television drama series premiered in January 2023. An original net animation (ONA) series adaptation by Studio Deen premiered in June 2023 on Netflix.

By December 2020, the manga had over 6 million copies in circulation. Ōoku: The Inner Chambers won an Excellence Prize at the 10th Japan Media Arts Festival, a special prize at The Japanese Association of Feminist Science Fiction and Fantasy's fifth annual Sense of Gender Awards in 2005, and the Grand Prize of the 13th Tezuka Osamu Cultural Prize in 2009.

== Outline ==
The world of Ōoku: The Inner Chambers is modeled on the Edo period in Japan, and centers on the Ōoku of Edo Castle, where the basis of social management and power is shifted from men to women as a result of the rapid decline in the male population caused by a mysterious plague.

In this work, figures who are male in history, such as the Shoguns of the Tokugawa clan for generations and those who held important positions, are replaced by women, and figures who are female by men. The story is composed of detailed descriptions based on historical facts interwoven with fiction. As for descriptions based on historical facts such as a report by an Opperhoofd: "I had an audience with Iemitsu through a blind, and I thought his voice sounded like a boy's. In the audience, only young men were seated with him. I saw many women working in the city." The rough outline in the frontispiece and columns in the magazine "Melody" reads, "Gender reversal! Parallel historical drama" or "This is a story that approximates but is not identical to the Edo period in Japan," etc., and is positioned as a so-called science fiction work (historical alteration science fiction).

== Story ==
During the rule of Tokugawa Iemitsu, the third Shogun of the Tokugawa shogunate, a boy was attacked by a bear in a rural village in the Kantō region, which triggered the spread of a strange disease later known as the "redface pox." No cure or treatment was ever discovered for the disease, except that it "only affects young boys" and has an "80% fatality rate." As a result, the male population plummeted to about one-quarter of the female population, and the social structure of Japan was drastically changed. Boys were raised as scarce stallions and were forced to either go to grooms, be rented out to poor families who could not get grooms at any price per night, or sell their bodies in the brothels. On the other hand, women replaced men as the main labor force, and all family businesses were handed down from woman to woman. In Edo Castle, too, the shogunship was handed over to women after the third Shogun, Iemitsu, and the Ōoku attracted endangered young men as proof of the Shogun's prestige, creating a world of men commonly referred to as "three thousand beautiful men."

== Characters and their storylines ==
=== Yoshimune ===
The story begins with the death of the seventh Shogun, Tokugawa Ietsugu, a young girl, and the subsequent reign of the eighth Shogun, Yoshimune. She appointed her entourage Kanō Hisamichi as her intermediator, and carried out various reforms of the shogunate administration. Her decisive reforms also extended to the Ōoku, where three thousand beautiful men were ridiculed as the wasteful spenders of the shogunate. One day, Yoshimune wondered why women had both female and male names. In official documents, all women were listed under male names, and even if they had husbands, they were either not mentioned, or they were purposely listed as wives under female names. She believed that this made it impossible to obtain accurate statistics for the country and harmed the shogunate administration. She met with Murase Masasuke, the head of Secretary, to view the logbooks recording everything in the Ōoku. Masasuke told her that the logbooks were named the Chronicle of the Dying Day by Kasuga, the founder of the Ōoku. Yoshimune asked him what kind of man Kasuga was, but Masasuke revealed that Lady Kasuga was a woman. Yoshimune was surprised and began opening the pages of the logbooks. She thought that reading them would explain why official records used male names even though women were running the country.

=== Iemitsu ===
The Chronicle of the Dying Day, as read by Yoshimune, dates back to the rule of the third Shogun, Iemitsu. The redface pox was spreading throughout Japan. Arikoto, a handsome monk of noble birth who had come to Edo Castle from Kyoto, was forcibly returned to secular life along with a boy monk, Gyokuei, under threat from Lady Kasuga, and was admitted to the Ōoku to become Iemitsu's page. However, it was revealed that the original Iemitsu had already died of the redface pox and that Arikoto's entry to the Ōoku was so that Chie, Iemitsu's illegitimate daughter, could give birth to an heir. The truth is that for the sake of the continuation of the Tokugawa clan, the Ōoku had been rewritten by Lady Kasuga to be populated by men.

As Arikoto interacted with Chie, he learned of her difficult upbringing in which she was forced to take the place of the Shogun, and stripped of her life as a woman. Arikoto affirmed Chie's existence as a woman, and Chie also fell in love with him. Filled with affection, Chie began to show her original intelligence and talent for politics.

After the death of Lady Kasuga, Chie announced the death of the original Iemitsu to all the feudal lords in Japan and declared that she would assume the title of Iemitsu herself and rule the country as a female Shogun. The lords, who had been suffering from a decline in the number of male heirs, followed suit, and it became the basic rule that women would inherit the governorship.

Chie, who was unable to have any children with Arikoto, died at the age of 27 after having three children with her concubines, including Gyokuei. Upon Chie's death, Gyokuei was ordained and changed his name to Keishō-in, but Arikoto was not ordained and remained in the Ōoku as the general director under Chie's last will.

=== Ietsuna ===
Chie's eldest daughter, Chiyo, became the fourth Shogun, Ietsuna, at the age of 11. She was nicknamed "Lady Do So" because of her lack of interest in politics and her "You may do so" attitude toward the advice of shogunate officials. However, with the help of Arikoto and other outstanding vassals from her mother's time, her shogunate maintained stability.

On the night of the Great fire of Meireki in Edo, Ietsuna is alone with Arikoto while evacuating the castle, and suddenly confesses her love for him. After Arikoto helped to restore the Ōoku from the fire, he was ordained, changing his name to Eikō-in and left the Ōoku. Ietsuna died without an heir, and the fifth Shogun was Tsunayoshi, the daughter of Chie and Keishō-in.

=== Tsunayoshi ===
Tsunayoshi became the fifth Shogun, and together with her Chief Retainer, Yanagisawa Yoshiyasu, she demonstrated political skills that were a complete change from those of her predecessor, while at the same time using her lovely and bewitching appearance to lead a wild sex life. Tsunayoshi fell in love with Emonnosuke, a candidate for a Concubine brought from Kyoto by her Official Husband, Takatsukasa Nobuhira, but Emonnosuke declined the position due to his age, and instead accepted the position of the General Director of the Ōoku.

Just then, Tsunayoshi was forced to have another child due to the sudden death of Matsu, the only heir she had already had. This led to an intensified power struggle for Tsunayoshi's favor between her father Keishō-in, Emonnosuke, and the Concubines who represented each of them. Tsunayoshi could not ignore her father's affection for her, continued to have sexual intercourse with young men even after she reached menopause, and her reputation declined in Edo, aided by the Akō Incident and the Edicts on Compassion for Living Things. Tsunayoshi, who was unable to rule well and produce an heir, wondered why she was still alive, but Emonnosuke told her that the relationship between a woman and a man was not limited to procreation. Tsunayoshi, who was united with Emonnosuke, broke the curse of her father and nominated Ienobu, the daughter of Tsunashige, whom her father disliked, as the next Shogun, but Emonnosuke died suddenly soon after.

Later, her father, Keishō-in, died, and Tsunayoshi contracted measles and became critically ill. Her Chief Retainer, Yoshiyasu, visited Tsunayoshi on her sickbed and suffocated her to death while confessing her secret feelings for Tsunayoshi. Her death was officially ruled as death by measles, and Yoshiyasu left Edo Castle as Ienobu assumed the shogunate.

=== Ienobu ===
The story takes place a little further back in time, during the rule of Tsunayoshi. Katsuta Sakyō, who was living a life of idleness in Edo, was picked up after being injured in a betting dispute by Manabe Akifusa, Ienobu's Chief Retainer. Sakyō eventually fell in love with Akifusa, but she intended to make him Ienobu's Concubine. Sakyō met Ienobu and was impressed by her personality, and they had a child together, Chiyo, who would later become her successor.

Ienobu, who became the sixth Shogun, struggled to correct Tsunayoshi's maladministration and was expected by the common people to be a stateswoman, but due to frailty, she died three years after assuming the shogunate. At this time, Sakyō had a half-hearted one-night stand with Akifusa, who was disturbed by her proprietress's death, which became the prelude to the Ejima-Ikushima affair.

=== Ietsugu ===
Upon Ienobu's death, Ienobu's Official Husband, Kunihiro, changed his name to Ten'ei-in and Sakyō changed his name to Gekkō-in, and both became ordained. Ienobu and Gekkō-in's daughter, Chiyo, became the seventh Shogun, Ietsugu. Ietsugu, only four years old, was so sickly that she was in danger of failing to reach adulthood, and there was a conflict in the Ōoku between Ten'ei-in of Yoshimune in the Kishū Domain faction and Akifusa and Gekkō-in of Tsugutomo in the Owari Domain faction over who should be the next Shogun. At that time, Ejima, the General Director of the Ōoku, who was on Gekkō-in's side, was captured as a result of the Ejima-Ikushima affair. It was a plot by Yoshimune's faction to force him to testify against Gekkō-in and Akifusa for their infidelity, but Ejima denied everything and was sentenced to death. Gekkō-in asked Ten'ei-in to spare Ejima's life and maintain the treatment of Akifusa after the change of Shogun in exchange for Yoshimune's nomination as the next Shogun, which Ten'ei-in accepted.

As a result, Yoshimune was chosen as the eighth Shogun. Ietsugu then died of illness at the age of seven.

=== Ieshige ===
Yoshimune, who had learned about the history of the Ōoku and Japan up to this point from reading the unofficial record, the Chronicle of the Dying Day, feared that she would be invaded by foreign nations with few men in Japan, and began efforts to eradicate the redface pox. At the same time, Yoshimune also made groundbreaking political reforms and was soon blessed with three daughters, and her rule seemed secure. However, Ieshige, the eldest daughter, had language disorder, while Munetake, the second daughter, was good-looking and intelligent, so much so that people suggested that Ieshige be disinherited and Munetake become the heir. Yoshimune, who knew that Ieshige's intelligence was normal and that she suffered from physical disabilities, declared that Ieshige would be the next Shogun, but Ieshige's character was distorted by the prejudice and ridicule she was subjected to, and she spent her days indulging in drinking and lust. The negative legacy of Yoshimune's rule, natural disasters, and the fact that Yoshimune was still alive and well as the Shogun Emerita, led Ieshige's rule to be regarded as incompetent as a Shogun. On the other hand, Ieshige's Chief Retainer, Tanuma Okitsugu, was recognized by Yoshimune for her insightful talents and began to play an active role on the political stage.

After Yoshimune's death, Okitsugu followed Yoshimune's wishes and embarked on measures to combat the redface pox. She invited Aonuma, a mixed blood who had studied Dutch medicine in Nagasaki, to give lectures on Dutch studies to the men in the Ōoku, and gathered information from Hiraga Gennai, who traveled around the country. In the process, Aonuma concluded that preventive measures, rather than curative measures, should be taken against the redface pox.

=== Ieharu ===
Ieshige handed over her shogunship to her eldest daughter, Ieharu, and retired to the Nishinomaru Palace in Edo Castle. Ieharu appointed Okitsugu as an Elder and entrusted her with the overall management of the shogunate and the redface pox. Okitsugu's skills earned her great support from the Ōoku and the shogunate officials, but her promotion of Dutch studies and mercantilism led some of her subjects and the common people of Edo to become displeased with her. In addition, behind the scenes, Yoshimune's granddaughter and the head of the Hitotsubashi family, Harunar, began to play a dark role.

Meanwhile, Aonuma and Kuroki, who had learned Dutch studies from Aonuma, searched for a method of preventing the redface pox and arrived at the variolation method based on information obtained from Western books. Gennai found a patient with attenuated pox, and the method was successful, but among those inoculated, Matsudaira Sadanobu's nephew died from the side effect. In addition, Okitsugu lost her power due to a series of natural disasters, including the Tenmei eruption and the Great Tenmei famine, the death of Ieharu's successor Iemoto, and the assassination of Okitsugu's daughter, Okitomo, which led to her downfall at the same time as Ieharu's death. Aonuma was condemned to death, and Kuroki, who had studied Dutch studies, and others were banished from the Ōoku. Gennai contracted syphilis as a result of Harunari's plot and died, and Kuroki, who was left behind, expressed his anger at the unreasonableness of the situation.

Harunari was expected to become the 11th Shogun, but she announced that her son Ienari would become Shogun. Harunari persuaded the shogunate officials that Ienari had been vaccinated by Aonuma and others, and that there was no need to worry about the possibility of redface pox. This resulted in the birth of Ienari, the first male Shogun since Iemitsu.

=== Ienari ===
Although Ienari was inaugurated as a male Shogun, he was not allowed to meddle in politics, and the real power was in the hands of his mother, Harunari. She forced Ienari to have children, while she assassinated them out of boredom. Ienari contacted Kuroki behind Harunari's back and had them resume their research on redface pox in secret. Eventually, Kuroki and his team arrived at a vaccination using attenuated redface pox bear as the seed and succeeded in preventing the plague without any side effects. However, the fame of the vaccine reached Edo Castle, and it was revealed to Harunari that Ienari had been secretly helping his research on the redface pox.

Harunari tries to poison Ienari, but at that moment, it is Harunari who falls ill from the poison. Ienari's Official Wife Shige and his Concubine Shiga realized that it was Ienari who had poisoned their children, and over the years they had been planning to assassinate Harunari while deceiving even their husband Ienari. Shiga, who had herself been poisoning Harunari for many years, died on the spot, and Harunari, although she survived, was unable to speak or move.

Ienari then exercised his true power as the Shogun and promoted the spread of vaccination against the redface pox. As a result, the male population recovered rapidly and the Kasei culture reached its zenith. Ienari handed over his shogunship to his son Ieyoshi but continued to hold political power as the Shogun Emeritus, and a few years later, Ienari reconciled with Shige, with whom he had been estranged since the attempted poisoning of Harunari, and died.

=== Ieyoshi ===
While the restoration of the male population has led to a resurgence of inheritance by male samurai, the Abe family, which has served the Tokugawa family for many years, had a female head of the family, Abe Masahiro. Masahiro, who had achieved much success as a Magistrate of the Temples and Shrines, was promoted by a shogunate official to the position of Elder at a young age, although the number of women in the shogunate was declining. Masahiro took in Takiyama, a male prostitute from a samurai background, whom she had known well, and invited him to work with her for Japan and the Shogun.

In 1853, the year of the Perry Expedition, the 13th Shogun was inaugurated by Iesada, daughter of Ieyoshi.

=== Iesada ===
Iesada had been sexually abused by her father, Ieyoshi, since she was a child. Masahiro, who came to Edo Castle as an Elder, sensed this and, with the help of Kōdai-in (formerly Shige), succeeded in enclosing Iesada in the inner part of Nishinomaru to protect her from Ieyoshi. Takiyama was appointed as the General Director in charge of the inner part of Nishinomaru. On the other hand, Ieyoshi's obsession with Iesada remained unabated, and two of Iesada's Official Husbands were assassinated in succession.

The situation in Japan was changing, and the exclusion of foreigners was on the rise; when Matthew C. Perry arrived in Japan in 1853, there was uproar in Edo, Ieyoshi panicked and died suddenly, and Iesada was appointed Shogun. Masahiro solicited the opinions of samurai, townspeople, and farmers alike, and the establishment of the Nagasaki Naval Training Center and the conclusion of the Convention of Kanagawa marked the end of the isolationist regime that had existed for 200 years.

Iesada married Shimazu Taneatsu, and later learned that Taneatsu was on a mission to install Yoshinobu of the Hitotsubashi family as the next Shogun by a trick of the Satsuma Domain. However, Iesada's personality touched Taneatsu, and he devoted himself to Iesada wholeheartedly, and Iesada also opened her heart to Taneatsu. Iesada eventually became pregnant with Taneatsu's child but died before the last month of pregnancy. In accordance with Iesada's will, Taneatsu changed his name to Tenshō-in without being ordained and adopted Tomiko from the Kishū Tokugawa family to become the next Shogun.

=== Iemochi ===
Soon after Tomiko changed her name to Iemochi and became Shogun, the Ansei Purge occurred. As part of the Union of the Imperial Court and the Shogunate, a wedding was to take place between Emperor Kōmei's brother, Prince Kazu and Iemochi, but when he arrived, he was a woman dressed as a man. She revealed that she was Chikako, the sister of the real Prince Kazu, and that she had taken the place of her brother who did not want to go to the wedding. This was an act of her desire to win the affection of her mother, Kangyō-in, who was always fond of her brother, but Iemochi stood by her, and Chikako opened her heart to Iemochi.

Meanwhile, in the political world, friction between exclusionists and diplomatists had begun to surface, and the Satsuma Domain was asked to reform the shogunate administration, which led to the appointment of Yoshinobu as the Shogun's Apotropos. However, despite his intelligence, Yoshinobu failed to win the support of all parties because of his arrogant attitude, and the Council of Advisors, which was established to discuss future politics, was dissolved after only two months. Various interests, including those of Satsuma Domain, Chōshū Domain, and the Imperial court, became entangled, and the survival of the Tokugawa shogunate was in jeopardy.

Then, Iemochi fell ill with thiamine deficiency. Concerned about the future of her country, the Tokugawa shogunate, and Chikako, Iemochi, despite her illness, went to Kyoto to see Emperor Kōmei, but she died in the capital. Iemochi's will that her adopted son Kamenosuke should be the next Shogun was crushed, and Yoshinobu became the last Shogun of the shogunate.

=== The end of the Ōoku ===
Although the war between the shogunate and the Chōshū Domain was averted on the pretext of Iemochi's death, the end of the shogunate government was no longer inevitable with the return of power to the Imperial court. Fearing that he would be slandered as a dynastic enemy by the new government forces that had taken the name of the Imperial army, Yoshinobu retreated from the front lines. Katsu Kaishū, who had been given full authority over the shogunate forces by Yoshinobu, went to talk with Saigō Takamori, the commander of the new government forces, to prevent a general attack on Edo. Takamori pressed Kaishū to hand over Yoshinobu or fight back in Edo. Takamori argued that Yoshinobu's death was necessary to bring to naught the shameful history of the Tokugawa, who had ruled the country by women. Hearing this, Chikako was furious and intervened, revealing that she was a woman, and demanded that the general attack be called off, citing the case of Prince Kazu's substitution and the involvement of Iwakura Tomomi on the side of the new government in the poisoning of Emperor Kōmei. As a result, Takamori agreed to state that all Shoguns of the Tokugawa family for generations were men, and the bloodless fall of Edo Castle was accomplished. Instead of the entire history of the Tokugawa women being buried in darkness, the city of Edo and its people, whom they had protected and loved, were preserved.

In 1871. Tenshō-in, a Satsuma man on a Western voyage as Shimazu Taneatsu, told a little girl, Tsuda Umeko, who is going to study on the same ship: "Even a woman can become a person to run a country. This country was once ruled by women for generations."

== Media ==
=== Manga ===
Ōoku: The Inner Chambers is written and illustrated by Fumi Yoshinaga. It was serialized in Hakusensha's Melody from June 28, 2004, to December 28, 2020. Hakusensha collected its chapters in nineteen tankōbon volumes (79 chapters) released from October 4, 2005, to February 26, 2021.

In North America, the manga is licensed by Viz Media. The manga is also licensed in French by Kana and in Taiwan by Sharp Point Press.

==== Volume list ====
No.	Original release date	Original ISBN	English release date	English ISBN
1	October 4, 2005	4-59-214301-9	August 18, 2009	1-4215-2747-2
Chapter One; Chapter Two; Chapter Three; Chapter Four; End Notes
A young samurai, Mizuno Yūnoshin, who was born as the son of a poor Bannerwoman resolves to give his sister a dowry by joining the Ōoku of a seven-year-old girl Shogun, leaving his childhood sweetheart behind to hopefully she find a husband. He adjusts to the life of the Ōoku with the assistance of Sugishita, including the advances of his superiors there. The Shogun dies and a new Shogun who is thrifty but who does not know the customs, Yoshimune takes power. Mizuno rises in the ranks to be in the Personal Attendants from whom Yoshimune can take a Concubine. She approves of his simple attire and chooses him to be her first Concubine, a position that customarily ensures his death. The morning after, he is taken to a garden to be executed but is spared by Yoshimune, who gives him a new name and some money and tells him where his still-unmarried childhood sweetheart is. Yoshimune meets a Dutch ambassador by dressing in men's clothes and hiding behind a screen. She violates protocol by speaking within his hearing. Later, she discusses with her entourage about the customs of naming. Yoshimune later dismisses all the beautiful young men of the Ōoku, telling them to marry, and arranges for Sugishita to be a Personal Attendant. Yoshimune seeks out the oldest man of the Ōoku, who she suspects may know more about the strange customs, and he gives her logbooks called the Chronicle of the Dying Day.
2	December 4, 2006	4-59-214302-7	December 15, 2009	1-4215-2748-0
Chapter Five; Chapter Six; Chapter Seven; Chapter Eight; Chapter Nine; End Notes
3	December 25, 2007	978-4-592-14303-1	April 20, 2010	1-4215-2749-9
Chapter Ten; Chapter Eleven; Chapter Twelve; Chapter Thirteen; Chapter Fourteen; End Notes
4	December 24, 2008	978-4-592-14304-8	August 17, 2010	1-4215-3169-0
Chapter Fifteen; Chapter Sixteen; Chapter Seventeen; Chapter Eighteen; End Notes
5	October 5, 2009	978-4-592-14305-5	December 21, 2010	1-4215-3669-2
Chapter Nineteen; Chapter Twenty; Chapter Twenty-One; Chapter Twenty-Two; End Notes
6	August 28, 2010	978-4-592-14306-2	July 19, 2011	1-4215-3961-6
Chapter Twenty-Three; Chapter Twenty-Four; Chapter Twenty-Five; Chapter Twenty-Six; End Notes
7	June 28, 2011	978-4-592-14307-9	July 17, 2012	978-1-4215-4220-1
Chapter Twenty-Seven; Chapter Twenty-Eight; Chapter Twenty-Nine; Chapter Thirty; End Notes
8	September 28, 2012	978-4-592-14308-6	September 17, 2013	978-1-4215-5482-2
Chapter Thirty-One; Chapter Thirty-Two; Chapter Thirty-Three; Chapter Thirty-Four; Chapter Thirty-Five; End Notes
9	December 3, 2012	978-4-592-14309-3	January 21, 2014	1-4215-5877-7
10	October 28, 2013	978-4-592-14310-9	November 18, 2014	1-4215-7242-7
11	August 28, 2014	978-4-592-14545-5	November 17, 2015	978-1-4215-7979-5
12	June 26, 2015	978-4-592-14546-2	November 15, 2016	978-1-4215-8643-4
13	April 28, 2016	978-4-592-14547-9	November 21, 2017	978-1-4215-9215-2
14	February 28, 2017	978-4-592-14548-6	November 20, 2018	978-1-4215-9775-1
15	December 28, 2017	978-4-592-14549-3	May 21, 2019	978-1-9747-0316-6
16	October 29, 2018	978-4-592-16276-6	December 17, 2019	978-1-9747-0840-6
17	August 28, 2019	978-4-592-16277-3	August 18, 2020	978-1-9747-1488-9
18	June 26, 2020	978-4-592-16278-0	June 15, 2021	978-1-9747-2223-5
19	February 26, 2021	978-4-592-16279-7	March 15, 2022	978-1-9747-2654-7

=== Live-action film ===
Fuminori Kaneko directed a live-action adaptation of the manga entitled Ooku Danjo Gyakuten (one English translation of the title being Lady Shogun and her Men), specifically covering the Yoshimune and Mizuno arc of the story. Filming began in the spring of 2010, and the film opened on October 1, 2010. Kazunari Ninomiya played the role of Yuunoshin Mizuno, a new addition to the Shogun's harem, and Ko Shibasaki played Shogun Yoshimune.

=== Live-action series ===
A ten episode drama, Ōoku – Tanjō: Arikoto and Iemitsu aired on TBS between October 12, 2012, and December 14, 2012, starring Masato Sakai and Mikako Tabe. The screenwriter was Yumiko Kamiyama. It achieved an audience share of between 7.0% and 11.6% during its first airing. Masato Sakai won a prize in the Galaxy Award for his part in this drama and another work of his.

Another television drama series was announced in August 2022 and aired between January 10, 2023, and March 14, 2023, in NHK's "Drama 10" slot, starring Sota Fukushi, Mayu Hotta, and Yuki Saito. It is directed by Taku Ohara, Akihiro Tajima, and Hideaki Kawano, with a screenplay by Yoshiko Morishita, and music by Kohta Yamamoto. Lilas Ikuta performed the series' theme song "Tanpopo" (蒲公英).

=== Anime ===
An original net animation adaptation was announced at AnimeJapan on March 25, 2023. It was produced by Studio Deen and directed by Noriyuki Abe, with scripts written by Rika Takasugi and music composed by Kenji Kawai. It premiered worldwide on Netflix on June 29, 2023.

No.	Title
1	"Episode 1"
The "redface pox" has devastated the male population in Japan and women have taken on most of the male roles, primarily relegating men to the role of reproduction and turning combat skills into a male hobby. A young samurai, Mizuno Yūnoshin, from a bannerman family resolves to provide a dowry for his sister by joining the Ōoku of the seven-year-old girl Shogun. He leaves his childhood sweetheart behind and adjusts to the life in the Ooku with the assistance of the older Sugishita. The young Shogun dies and the mature woman Yoshimune is appointed as the new Shogun. She shuns the existing conventions and rules, and begins cutting some of the extravagant expenses of the Ooku. Mizuno rises in the ranks of attendants and Yoshimune chooses him to be the "Groom of the Bedchamber", a position that customarily ensures his subsequent death. However, when he is about to be executed, Yoshimune spares him, gives him a new name and money so he can marry his sweetheart. Yoshimune dismisses most of the beautiful young men of the Ooku telling them to marry, and takes on Sugishita as her Groom of the Bedchamber. She continues to challenge existing protocols and question the custom of women of power adopting men's names. Yoshimune then seeks out the Chief Scribe, the oldest man of the Ooku, and seeks information on the past in which she believes men were more numerous. In reply he gives her a book entitled "Chronicle of the Dying Day". Feature length episode.
2	"Episode 2"
Some time in the past, the Shogun dies from "redface pox" and the young and handsome Arikoto, the new Abbot of Keiko-in, visits Edo to pay his respects to the new Shogun Iemitsu. He catches the eye of Lady Kasuga, head of the Ooku, and is pressured to stay in Edo and become a page to Iemitsu. When he refuses to recant his monastic vows and have sex with a woman, Lady Kasuga orders one of his companions killed and one of the women who was sent to tempt him as well. Arikoto is then forced to decide between maintaining his vows or saving the lives of his remaining companion Gyokuei and the other two women. However, the women are secretly killed later to ensure their silence.
3	"Episode 3"
As more men outside Edo succumb to the pox, and women are forced to take on their duties, Gyokuei joins Arikoto in the all male Ooku where they begin their new life. Lady Kasuga presents Arikoto the Shogun where he is stunned to find she is a young woman instead of a man. She then beats him when he refuses to accept a woman's name, O-man, in place of his own. The retainer, Inaba Masakatsu, explains to Arikoto that he provides the mature male voice of the shogun and how seventeen years ago, the young Iemitsu raped a local woman who then gave birth a daughter. When Iemitsu died from the pox without an heir, Lady Kasuga kept his death a secret and made the girl the Shogun, also closing the country off to foreigners to protect the secret. Arikoto then learns that his role is to act as breeding stock for the Shogun so that the Tokugawa blood line will be continued.
4	"Episode 4"
Arikoto recovers from his beating and he is introduced to the samurai in the Ooku who treat him with contempt and rape Gyokuei. They goad Arikoto into an exhausting sword exercise, but later Iemitsu visits him they both show their more gentle sides to each other. She begins to visit him regularly and they develop respect for each other as they play with the cat she gave him. One night in revenge for his abuse, Gyokuei kills the cat near the retainer Shigesato's quarters and he is blamed for the death. Arikoto intercedes to stop Iemitsu from killing Shigesato and he is allowed to commit honorable seppuku. From that day, attitudes of the men towards Arikoto shift markedly in his favor and he accepts the name O-man. However, one day Arikoto and Iemitsu argue over her cruel behavior towards others. She claims that she has had a miserable life, but Arikoto reminds her that she is not the only one who has suffered.
5	"Episode 5"
In an act to humiliate Arikoto and the other "grooms", Iemitsu orders the men to dress in women's clothing to amuse her. As the men dance awkwardly, she recalls her unhappily life: how she was taken by Lady Kasuga from her mother who was killed to maintain her silence; forced to become her father's surrogate against her will; treated as a vessel to produce the next Shogun; raped in the gardens by an unsuspecting samurai; and giving birth to a daughter who soon died. When Arikoto enters the room, beautifully dressed in a kimono, she sends everyone away and they embrace each other. A year later, Arikoto and Iemitsu are still happily in love, but Lady Kasuga is concerned that Iemitsu is not pregnant.
6	"Episode 6"
While dreaming, Lady Kasuga recalls entering the service of the Shogun along with her son, who is now known as Inaba Masakatsu. In an effort to produce a Tokugawa offspring to maintain peace in the country, Lady Kasuga selects a young man in town named Sutezo who resembles Arikoto to become the new Groom of the Bedchamber. She forces Arikoto into convincing Iemitsu to accept him. Although Iemitsu believes that she is barren following the difficult birth of her first child, she and Arikoto realize that she must accept the situation for them both to stay alive.
7	"Episode 7"
Both Arikoto and Iemitsu grudgingly accept their destinies and shortly thereafter, Iemitsu becomes pregnant with Sutezo's child. She gives birth to a daughter, Chiyo, which pleases Lady Kasuga. However, Sutezo accidentally falls becoming paralyzed and incapable of performing his duties. Lady Kasuga allows Iemitsu to be with Arikoto again, but when after three months she does not fall pregnant, new grooms are brought in an effort to produce a male heir. Iemitsu accepts the compromise although she pledges her eternal love for Arikoto. Seeing how fulfilled Iemitsu is as a mother, Arikoto even asks Gyokuei to sleep with Iemitsu.
8	"Episode 8"
The countryside is stricken by drought causing widespread famine and many people head toward Edo in search of food. Iemitsu travels outside the castle walls and sees how desperate people have become, especially due to the shortage of young men. She orders rice to be temporarily provided to those in need, not necessarily to save them, but to prevent a peasant uprising. During an annual celebration when the feudal lords pay homage to the Shogun, it is obvious that many do not have male heirs and have brought their daughters dressed as men. Masamori proposes that for the time being, women be allowed to become successors much to the horror of Lady Kasuga. However, he argues that it will prevent a reduction in the number of families which could concentrate power in a few powerful ones which may become a threat to the Tokugawa clan.
9	"Episode 9"
Lady Kasuga becomes gravely ill creating a power vacuum in the Ooku. Surprisingly Arikoto steps in to care for her while Iemitsu considers the political implications. Sutezo succumbs to the red-face pox, causing severe implications for the Ooku so Arikoto quarantines the infected men in his rooms. Meanwhile, outside the castle, the pox claims the lives of four fifths of the adult male population. In a desperate bid to maintain order, Iemitsu proclaims a notice preventing the buying and selling of land and that women can become family heirs to prevent the growth of powerful landholders. Before she dies, Lady Kasuga tasks her son Murase Masasuke with recording the events in the Ooku in what she names the "Chronicle of the Dying Day" and names Arikoto as her successor. Arikoto names Masasuke as the Chief Scribe, Katsuta Yorihide as Usher of the Purse, Nishina Kiyonari as Bearer of the Key and assigns other roles to the men in the Ooku. In the greatest departure from the past, Iemitsu reveals herself publicly as the first female Shogun.
10	"Episode 10"
Iemitsu oversees a new regime where women can become feudal lords and hold positions formerly reserved for men as a temporary measure to preserve the Tokugawa Shogunate. She dismisses 100 of the least skilled samurai from the Ooku to work in the Yoshiwara while retaining the most experienced fighters as her guards. She decrees that the groom of subsequent Shoguns must be selected from within the Ooku and that he then be put to death for defiling the Shogun. She appoints Arikoto as Lady Kasuga's successor to the position of Senior Chamberlain. After giving birth to a second daughter with Gyokuei, renamed O-Tama, she has two miscarriages and dies at the young age of 27 leaving Arikoto to watch over her daughter Chiyo. The percentage of men gradually increases to one quarter of the population, but their main responsibility is fathering children while women still shoulder most of the responsibility for physical labor and trade. Chiyo then becomes Ietsuna, the fourth Shogun of the Tokugawa clan.

== Reception ==
=== Manga ===
Ōoku: The Inner Chambers was nominated for the first annual Manga Taishō in 2008. It was nominated for the Tezuka Osamu Cultural Prize three years in a row from 2007 to 2009 before it won the Grand Prize in April 2009. Previously, the manga also won an Excellence Prize in the 10th Japan Media Arts Festival in 2006. It won a special prize in The Japanese Association of Feminist Science Fiction and Fantasy's 5th and 21st annual Sense of Gender Awards in 2005 and 2021, respectively.

The manga won the 2009 James Tiptree Jr. Award, which is awarded to science fiction works which expand or explore one's understanding of gender. In January 2011, the manga won the 56th Shogakukan Manga Award in the shōjo category. The series was awarded the Grand Prize of the 42nd Nihon SF Taisho Award in 2021. Ōoku: The Inner Chambers was nominated for the 53rd Seiun Award in the Best Comic category in 2022. In January 2010, The American Library Association's Young Adult Library Services Association (YALSA) division listed Ōoku: The Inner Chambers in the 2010 Top Ten Great Graphic Novels for Teens list.

==== Sales ====
By December 2020, the manga had over 6 million copies in circulation. The fourth volume of Ōoku: The Inner Chambers was ranked 5th on the Tohan charts between December 23, 2008, and January 5, 2009 and ranked 24th on the Tohan charts between January 6 and 12, 2009. The seventh volume of the manga sold around 167,000 copies in its debut week and reached No. 1 on the Japan's Oricon weekly comic ranking for the first time in July 2011.

==== Critical reception ====
In a review of the first volume, Casey Brienza of Anime News Network stated that "the manga is the perfect marriage of stylistic shortcomings to appropriate subject matter—the beautiful costumes are important players and plot points throughout the story, and the lack of character expression matches a world of intensely ritualized social interaction perfectly. Furthermore, while Yoshinaga isn't know[n] for her gorgeously rendered settings, artistic assistants provide much needed background detail and atmosphere."

Holly Ellingwood describes the manga as a "fascinating study of 'what if'", and praises Viz's presentation of the manga. Katherine Dacey criticised the English translation of the manga, finding it awkwardly juxtaposed faux-old-English with modern language, and enjoyed the characterisation of Yoshimune. She found the second volume more engaging than the first. Carlo Santos of Anime News Network enjoyed the artwork which shows the period detail in the second volume. Leroy Douresseaux wrote that by the sixth volume, the focus of the series was much more on character drama and the political climate than on gender roles.
