= Ejima-Ikushima affair =

18th-century Japanese scandal

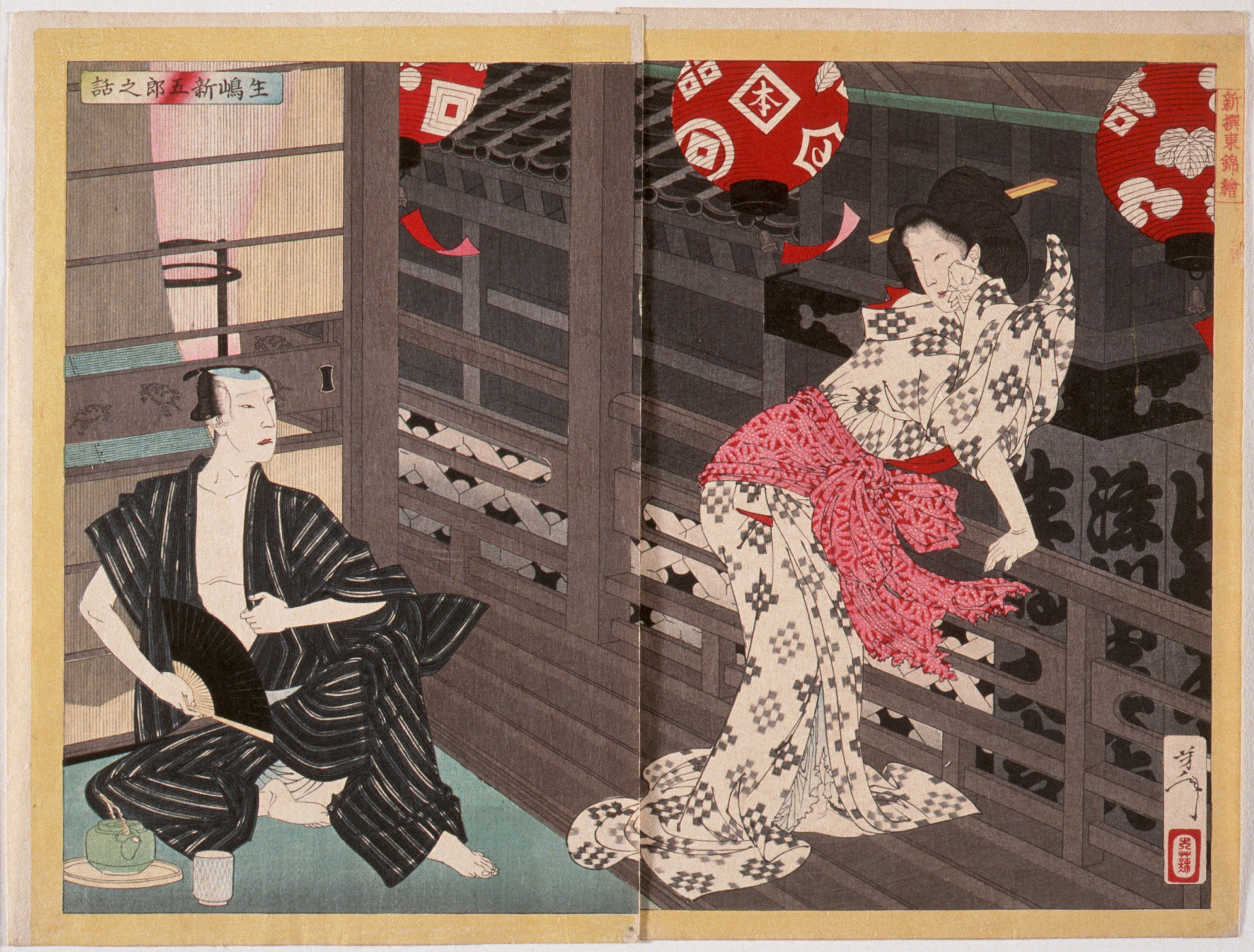
Woodcut

The Ejima-Ikushima affair (江島生島事件, Ejima Ikushima jiken) was the most significant scandal in the Ōoku, the Tokugawa shōgun's harem during the Edo period of the history of Japan, that occurred in February 1714. After inviting a Kabuki actor and others to a tea house, Lady Ejima missed her curfew into the Ōoku and became the focus of a power struggle between the mother of the ruling shogun and the wife of the late shogun. An investigation into the curfew saw 1,300 people being punished and led to the death of Ejima's brother.

== Background ==
The Ōoku was a complex of Edo Castle, the seat of the shōgun of the Tokugawa shogunate, that served as a residence for women connected to the reigning shōgun. It functioned as a harem with different sections that housed the shōgun's official wife (Midaidokoro) and her children, his concubines and their children, widows of previous shōgun (Ōmidaidokoro), his mother, and their various servants. The Ōoku was highly regimented and controlled, resident women were held to strict standards, and adult men were forbidden from entering without the shōgun.

== Incident ==
On the twelfth day of the first month of the fourth year of the Shōtoku era (February 26, 1714, by the Western calendar), Ejima, a high-ranking lady in the Ōoku, visited the grave of the late shōgun Tokugawa Ienobu. Ejima's visit was a proxy for her superior Gekkō-in, mother of the ruling shōgun Tokugawa Ietsugu, who had been a lady-in-waiting and concubine of Ienobu. Ejima then accepted an invitation to attend a kabuki performance by the popular actor Ikushima Shingorō at the Yamamura-za theatre, located near Edo Castle. After the performance, she invited the actor and others to a party at a tea house. The party ran late and Ejima missed the closing of the gates to the Ōoku, and as she went from one gate to the next trying to gain entry, word of her situation reached the officials within.

Ejima became the focus of a power struggle between Gekkō-in and her rival Ten'ei-in, the official wife of the late Ienobu. They in turn were part of a larger power struggle between two factions in the Tokugawa elite: one led by Arai Hakuseki and Manabe Akifusa, the two closest advisors to both Ienobu and Ietsugu, and the other was headed by fudai daimyōs and the rōjū who had been in office since the time of the fifth shōgun Tokugawa Tsunayoshi.

== Aftermath ==
Ten'ei-in seized the opportunity of Ejima missing her curfew to launch an investigation of the Ōoku by the Machi-bugyō, with numerous infractions being discovered, and ultimately over 1,300 people were punished. Ejima was sentenced to death, but she received a pardon and was instead placed in custody of the Takatō Domain, while her brother was sentenced to die not by seppuku (which is an honoured death under Bushido), but by zanshu (beheading, which was more suited for a regular criminal). Ikushima was banished to the island of Miyake-jima and the Yamamura-za was disbanded, with its owner being banished to the island of Izu Ōshima. Over a century later, the kabuki theatres in Edo were relocated to Asakusa, farther away from Edo Castle. Within the Ōoku, Ten'ei-in emerged victorious as the most dominant woman in the harem. The following year, when Ietsugu died, she supported Tokugawa Yoshimune, the successful contender for the shogunate.

The Ejima-Ikushima affair has been dramatized in kabuki, and has been the subject of nagauta chants. Numerous films and television dramas have portrayed the event. The 2006 film Oh! Oku stars Yukie Nakama as Ejima and Hidetoshi Nishijima as Ikushima Shingorō. A 1971 television series featured Ineko Arima as Ejima, and kabuki actor Takao Kataoka (now Kataoka Nizaemon XV) as Ikushima.
