= Ōmidaidokoro =

Japanese title for wives of former shōguns

Ōmidaidokoro (大御台所) was a title that can only be given to the past shōgun's official widow or retired shōgun's chief consort/wife. These women had an extraordinary or considerable political power behind the scenes, leading much of the court's events and other events that impacted Japanese history. During the Edo period she resided in Ōoku, third corridor (sannomaru).

== Kamakura period ==
- Hōjō Masako, daughter of Hojō Tokimasa, wife of Minamoto no Yoritomo and mother of Minamoto no Yoriie and Minamoto no Sanetomo
- Bomon Nobuko (1193–1274), daughter of Bomon Nobukiyo and wife of Minamoto no Sanetomo
- Konoe Saiko (b. 1241), daughter of Konoe Kanetsune, wife of Prince Munetaka and mother of Prince Koreyasu

== Muromachi period ==
- Akahashi Toshi (1306–1365) wife of Ashikaga Takauji and mother of Ashikaga Yoshiakira
- Shibukawa Koshi (1332–1392), daughter of Shibukawa Yoshisue and wife of Ashikaga Yoshiakira
- Hino Nariko (1351–1405),wife of Ashikaga Yoshimitsu and daughter of Hino Tokimitsu
- Hino Eiko (1390–1431), wife of Ashikaga Yoshimochi, daughter of Hino Motoyasu and mother of Ashikaga Yoshikazu
- Hino Muneko (d. 1447), wife of Ashikaga Yoshinori and daughter of Hino Shigemitsu
- Hino Tomiko, wife of Ashikaga Yoshimasa, daughter of Hino Shigemasa and mother of Ashikaga Yoshihisa
- Hino Akiko, daughter of Hino Nagatoshi, wife of Ashikaga Yoshizumi and mother of Ashikaga Yoshiharu
- Keijuin (1514–1565), daughter of Konoe Hisamichi, wife of Ashikaga Yoshiharu and mother of Ashikaga Yoshiteru

== Edo period ==
- Oeyo, daughter of Azai Nagamasa, wife of Tokugawa Hidetada and mother of Tokugawa Iemitsu
- Takatsukasa Takako (1622–1683) later Honriin, wife of Tokugawa Iemitsu and daughter of Takatsukasa Nobufusa
- Takatsukasa Nobuko (1651–1709) later Tenjoin, wife of Tokugawa Tsunayoshi and daughter of Takatsukasa Norihira
- Konoe Hiroko (1666–1741) later Ten-ei'in, wife of Tokugawa Ienobu and daughter of Konoe Motohiro
- Imperial Princess Yasonomiya Yoshiko later Jorin'in-no-Miya (1714–1758), wife of Tokugawa Ietsugu and daughter of Emperor Reigen
- Shimazu no Shigehime or Tadakohime (1773–1844) later Kodai-in, wife of Tokugawa Ienari and daughter of Shimazu Shigehide of Satsuma Domain
- Shimazu Atsuhime or Fujiwara no Sumiko, later Tenshō-in, wife of Tokugawa Iesada, daughter of Shimazu Nariakira and adopted daughter of Konoe Tadahiro
- Chikako, Princess Kazu, later Seikan'in-no-miya, wife of Tokugawa Iemochi and daughter of Emperor Ninkō

== See also ==
- Midaidokoro
