= Ōoku (2003 TV series) =

2003–2006 Japanese TV series by FujiTV

- Country of origin: Japan
- No. of series: 6

Original release
- Release: 1968 – 2024

Ōoku (大奥) is a Japanese drama produced by FujiTV. The story is set in the Edo period and is fiction set against a background of historical fact. The Ōoku was the part the ladies lived in Edo Castle.

The popularity of the show has produced six series (1968, 1983, 2003, 2004, 2005 and 2024) as well as a 2006 film, Oh! Oku.

== Summary ==
The story is set in Edo period in Ōoku, a place where thousands of women work for one general. The story is told from the point of view of Maru, a girl from a merchant family. At that time, working in Ōoku was popular among girls. Maru was curious about Ōoku and took a job there out of curiosity. Other workers tended to bully her. One day, Tokuko, wife of a Tokugawa shogun(御台所 midaidokoro) saved Maru from the bullying. Maru and Tokuko become very close friends, even though there were from different ranks in society.

Tokuko was born into a high-class samurai family in Satsuma. She had a boyfriend, Tougo, who she wanted to marry, but for political reasons had to marry Iesada Tokugawa and lived her whole life in Ōoku. Tokuko is clever, tough, and self-confident, and always wanted to escape from Ōoku. Maru helps Tokuko adjust to her surroundings. Tokuko didn't like the system and rules of Ōoku, so she was defiant toward Takiyama, the woman who administrates the Ōoku.

Takiyama is the woman with the strongest authority in Ōoku, and is able to speak with the shogun equally. She is very strict to everyone, especially Tokuko and Maru, who are considered outsiders. She was born into a very poor family but, because of her beauty, she got a job in Ōoku. She worked hard to protect Ōoku because it is the only place she can live.

Takiyama disliked Tokuko, not only because she was from Satsuma, but because she envied Tokuko being Iesada Tokugawa's wife. Takiyama used to be Iesada's lover, but they couldn't marry or even love each other officially because of the distinction between their ranks. Iesada's feeling toward Tokuko grew when he married her, but Takiyama still couldn't forget about Iesada and was especially strict toward Tokuko. Takiyama asks one of her workers to poison Tokuko.

One day, Tokuko fell flat suddenly when she was eating. Someone had poisoned her dinner. Tokuko narrowly escaped death and started doubting Takiyama, but Takiyama ignored her doubts. Tokuko found poison in the kitchen, and asked Takiyama what the poison was. Takiyama said that it was a medicine for not having a baby. Tokuko was Iesada's wife, but he already had a child who would become the next shogun. Therefore, it was better for Tokuko to not have any children. Tokuko was shocked by Takiyama's story.

Tokuko was in the depths of despair. Having children was her only hope in Ōoku. If she could have a baby, she would have a hope for living. Though, as Takiyama said, she was not allowed to have a baby; thus she completely lost her hope for living. At the same time, Iesada's body was eaten up by unknown illness.

One day, there was a fire in Edo castle and Ōoku was also damaged. Ōoku was in panic. Maru took Tokuko somewhere safe, but Tokuko suddenly went to the opposite side. Maru ran to Iesada to tell about Tokuko. Iesada went inside Ōoku again to find Tokuko. Takiyama tried to stop him but he won't listen. Though, he fell down spitting blood. Tokuko was found by Maru and heard about Iesada. She stayed beside him, but there was nothing Tokuko can do. Iesada died taking Tokuko's hand.

Tokuko's lover, Tougo, came from Satsuma to help Tokuko escape from Ōoku, but she refused his offer. Tokuko decided to live in Ōoku and do what she can. She told Tougo that she learned lot of things from Iesada. Takiyama hears this conversation and changes her image of Tokuko.

Iesada Tokugawa's age had ended. Tokuko later took a tonsure, who would be later named "Tenshoin".

== Main casts ==
=== 1st season (2003) ===
- Miho Kanno as Atsuko
- Yuko Asano as Takiyama
- Chizuru Ikewaki as Maru
- Yumi Adachi as Kazunomiya
- Ryuji Harada as Tougo
- Kazuki Kitamura as Tokugawa Iesada, the 13th Shōgun
- Shingo Katsurayama as Tokugawa Iemochi, the 14th Shōgun
- Hirotarō Honda as Shimazu Nariakira
- Machiko Washio as Kuzuoka
- Kaori Yamaguchi as Yoshino
- Maki Kubota as Urao
- Kyōko Kishida as Murase
- Yōko Nogiwa as Jitsujōin

=== 2nd season (2004) ===
- Yuki Matsushita as Lady Kasuga
- Reiko Takashima as Oeyo (Sūgen-in)
- Asaka Seto as Oman (Eikō'in), a concubine of Iemitsu
- Hidetoshi Nishijima as Tokugawa Iemitsu, the 3rd Shōgun
- Mari Hoshino as Otama (Keishō'in), a concubine of Iemitsu and the mother of Tokugawa Tsunayoshi.
- Tae Kimura as Takako
- Kotomi Kyono as Oran (Hōju-in)
- Maho Nonami as Onatsu (Junshō-in)
- Ikkei Watanabe as Tokugawa Hidetada, the father of iemitsu
- Machiko Washio as Kuzuoka
- Kaori Yamaguchi as Yoshino
- Maki Kubota as Urao
- Kenta Suga as Tokumatsu (later Tokugawa Tsunayoshi)
- Meiko Kaji as Asahina
- Makoto Fujita as Tokugawa Ieyasu, the grandfather of iemitsu

=== 3rd season (2005) ===
- Rina Uchiyama as Yasuko
- Shōsuke Tanihara as Tokugawa Tsunayoshi, the 5th Shōgun
- Eiko Koike as Oden
- Saki Takaoka as Lady Emon'nosuke
- Kazuki Kitamura as Yanagisawa Yoshiyasu
- Shinobu Nakayama as Ōsuke
- Shihori Kanjiya as Someko
- Kimiko Yo as Otowa
- Ren Osugi as Tokugawa Mitsukuni
- Machiko Washio as Kuzuhara
- Kaori Yamaguchi
- Maki Kubota
- Kyoko Enami as Keishō-in, the mother of Tsunayoshi
- Norika Fujiwara as Nobuko

=== Film (2006) ===
- Yukie Nakama as Ejima
- Haruka Igawa as Gekkō-in
- Reiko Takashima as Ten'ei-in
- Kimura Tae as Hoshi-in
- Yuko Asano as Takigawa
- Yuki Matsushita as Denjoin
- Takeru Shibuya as Tokugawa Ietsugu, the 7th Shōgun
- Mitsuhiro Oikawa as Manabe Akifusa

=== TV special (2016) ===
- Erika Sawajiri as Omiyo and Ume
- Hiroki Narimiya as Tokugawa Ienari, the 11th Shōgun
- Mayu Watanabe (AKB48) as Oshima
- Misako Renbutsu as Uta
- Machiko Washio as Kuzuoka
- Kaori Yamaguchi as Yoshino
- Maki Kubota as Urao
- Rantarō Mine as Tokugawa Ieharu, the 10th Shōgun
- Toshiyuki Aono as Tanuma Okitsugu
- Yūko Asano as Lady Ōsaki

=== TV special: Ōoku the Final (2019) ===
- Fumino Kimura as Kume
- Takao Osawa as Tokugawa Yoshimune, the 8th Shōgun
- Eiko Koike as Gekkō-in
- Honami Suzuki as Ten'ei-in
- Minami Hamabe as Takehime
- Yoko Minamino as Takase
- Yukino Kishii as Taki
- Keiko Matsuzaka as Jōen-in
- Yūko Asano as Yoshiko
- Kazuki Kitamura as Tokugawa Muneharu
- Shōsuke Tanihara as Manabe Akifusa
- Houka Kinoshita as Tokugawa Ienobu, the 6th Shōgun
- Shingo Katsurayama
- Yukie Nakama as Narrator

=== 4th season (2024) ===
- Fuka Koshiba as Isonomiya Tomoko
- Kazuya Kamenashi (KAT-TUN) as Tokugawa Ieharu, the 10th Shōgun
- Nanase Nishino as Oshina
- Aoi Morikawa as Ochiho (Lady Chiho, later known as Renkō-in)
- Subaru Tani as Tokugawa Iemoto, Ieharu and Ochiho's son
- Ryōta Miyadate (Snow Man) as Matsudaira Sadanobu
- Masatō Ibu as Tokugawa Yoshimune, the 8th Shōgun
- Katsunori Takahashi as Tokugawa Ieshige, the 9th Shōgun
- Fuku Suzuki as Tokugawa Ienari, the 11th Shōgun
- Takanori Jinnai (Special appearance) as Tayasu Munetake
- Chiaki Kuriyama as Lady Matsushima
- Ken Yasuda as Tanuma Okitsugu
