= Ōoku =

Former women's quarters of Edo Castle

Coordinates: 35°41′18″N 139°45′16″E

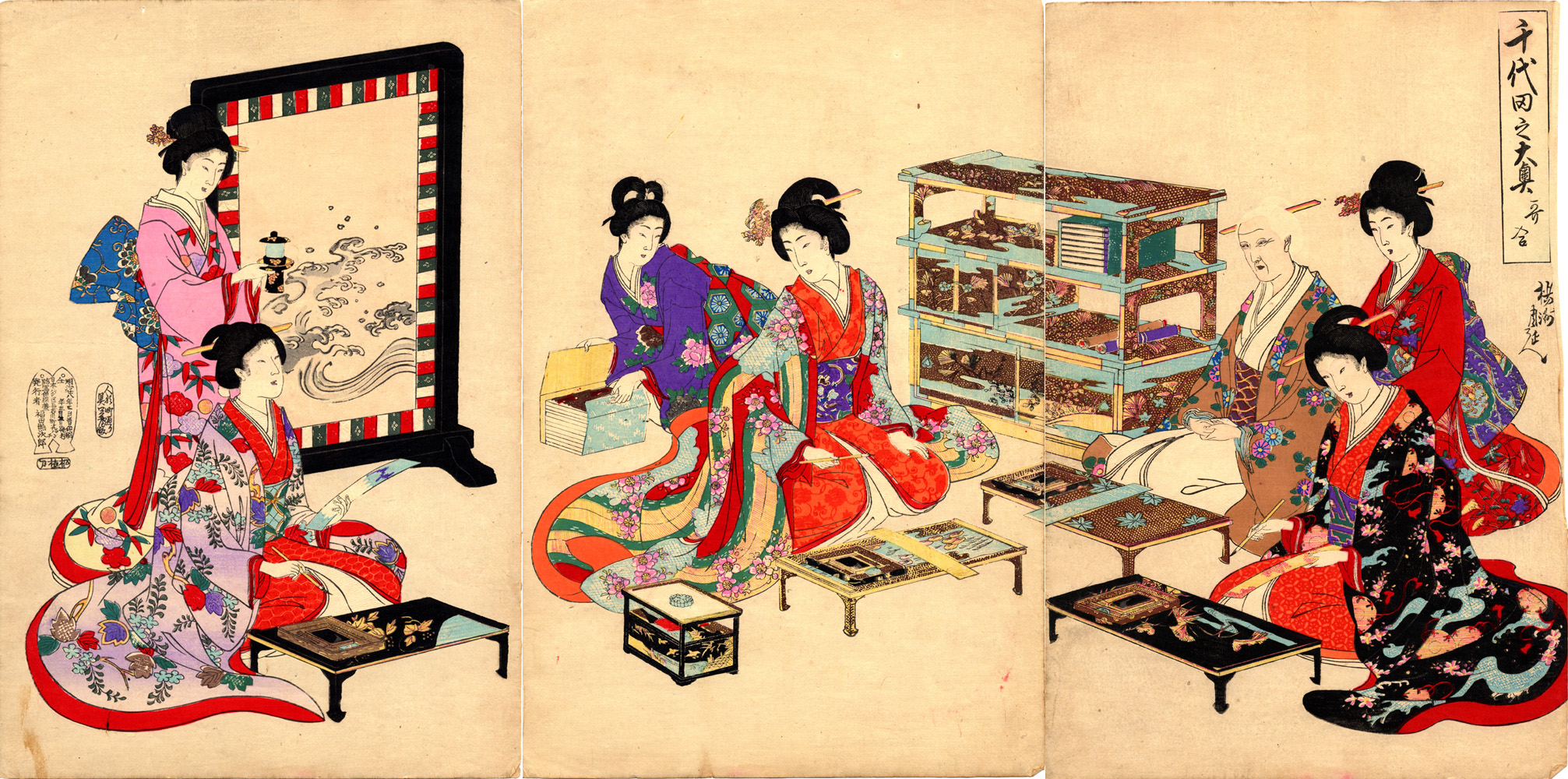
Ukiyo-e depiction of the Ōoku by Hashimoto Chikanobu

The Ōoku (大奥, "great interior") was historically the women's quarters of Edo Castle, the section where the women connected to the reigning shōgun resided. Similar areas in the castles of powerful daimyō, such as the Satsuma Domain, were also referred to by this term.

During the reign of the second shogun, Tokugawa Hidetada, Ōoku was established in Edo Castle as a women's room where his official wife (御台所, Midaidokoro), Oeyo, resided. During the reign of the third shogun, Tokugawa Iemitsu, the Ōoku was expanded at the suggestion of his nanny, Lady Kasuga, to ensure the birth of a male heir to the shogun's lineage, and became a vast shogun's harem with nearly 1,000 women working as maidservants.

The Ōoku was inhabited by the official wife and concubines of the shogun. The women of Ōoku were highly hierarchical, with the official wife of the shogun, who was of aristocratic lineage, ruling at the top, and the older women who had served her for a long time actually controlling Ōoku. The women who worked as maidservants in Ōoku were daughters of the Hatamoto (旗本), a high-ranking class of samurai, and they had servants from the chōnin (町人, townspeople) and peasants who worked for them. Even low-ranking servants were treated as concubines of the shogun if they bore his children. One such example was Otama, the daughter of a grocer, who gave birth to the fifth shogun, Tokugawa Ietsuna.

Adult men were generally forbidden to enter Ōoku; only the shogun, his male descendants and prepubescent boys who came to visit the maidservants were allowed. The highest official in the shogunate, the Rōjū (老中, Elder), could enter only when summoned on official business by the shogun's official wife, or a high-ranking woman in the Ōoku. However, men such as doctors, carpenters, and painters were also allowed to enter Ōoku as needed, and over time the number of men performing security, clerical, and other duties at Ōoku increased, albeit on a limited basis. The Ōoku was also used to ensure the Tokugawa shogun's rule over the country by arranging political marriages between the shogun's children and the children of daimyo in various regions. The Ōoku continued until 1868, when the Tokugawa shogunate was dissolved.

== Structure ==
No male adults were admitted onto the floor of the Ōoku without the permission of the shōgun. The corridor through which the shōgun entered was called Osuzu Rōka (御鈴廊下, great bell corridor), derived from the custom of ringing of the suzu bells to announce the entrance of the shōgun. This corridor was the only route which connected the Ōoku to rest of Edo Castle, and it was usually locked.

The Ōoku consisted of the Honmaru (本丸, the central section) where the midaidokoro, the shōgun's official wife, and her children resided (though only Oeyo, wife of Tokugawa Hidetada resided there with her children). Male heirs residing in the Honmaru were required to move to the Sannomaru after coming of age. The Ninomaru (ニの丸) was where the shōgun's concubines and their children resided, and the Sannomaru (三の丸) housed the oomidaidokoro (the past shōgun's official widow) and the former shōgun's widowed concubines without children in the shogunate family. Nagatsubone was where the senior chamberlain and servants resided, as well as the residence of male heirs from the time they came of age until their appointment as shogun. The Nakanomaru (中之丸) was a performance area for Noh plays, although during the reign of the third shōgun it was also the residence of his wife Takatsukasa Takako, who moved there after her third miscarriage.

After a fire destroyed the Honmaru and the Meiji Restoration brought about the end of the shogunate, the Ōoku also ceased to exist.

== Organisation ==
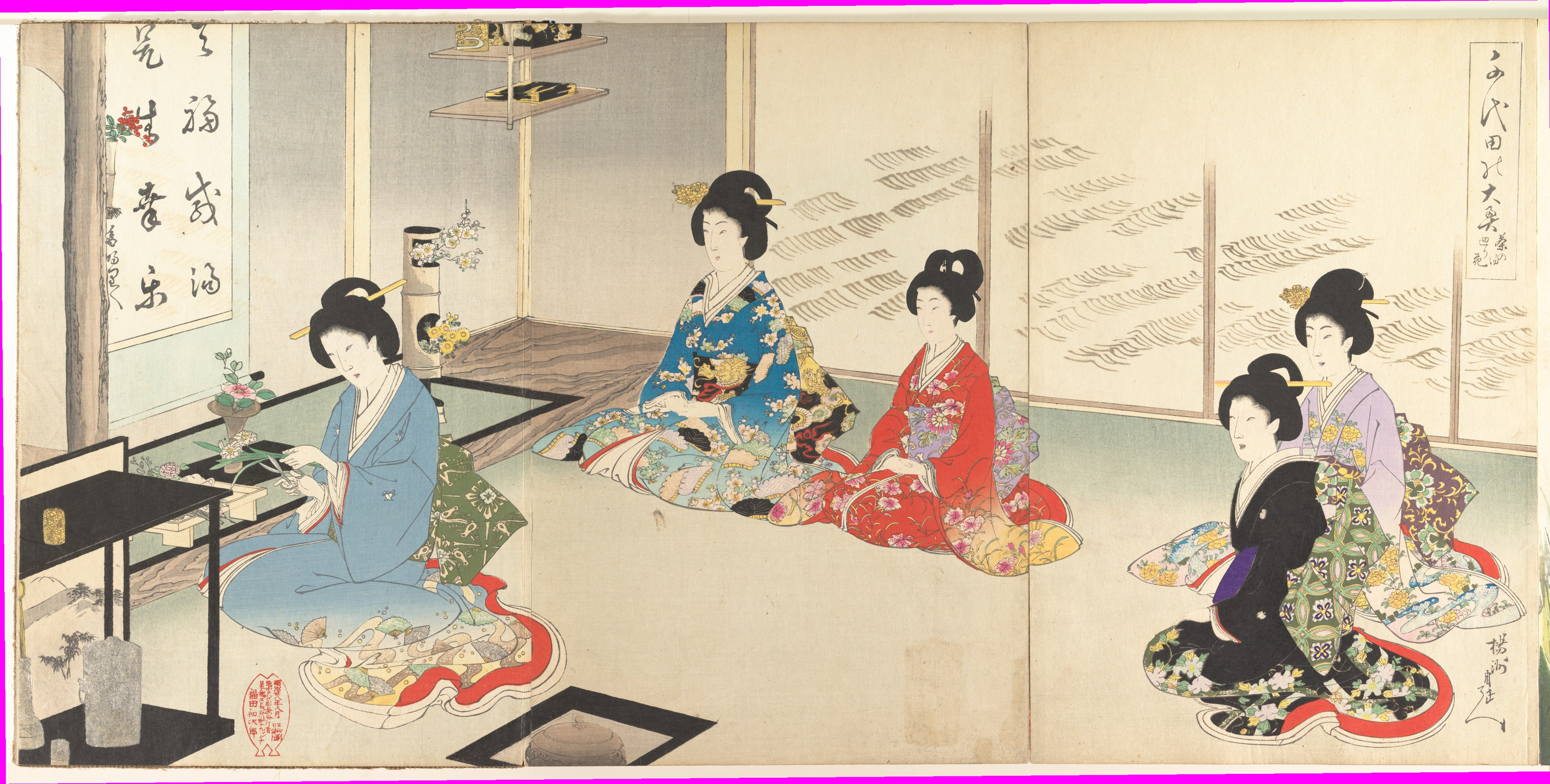
Depiction of ikebana flower arranging at the Ōoku (by Hashimoto Chikanobu)

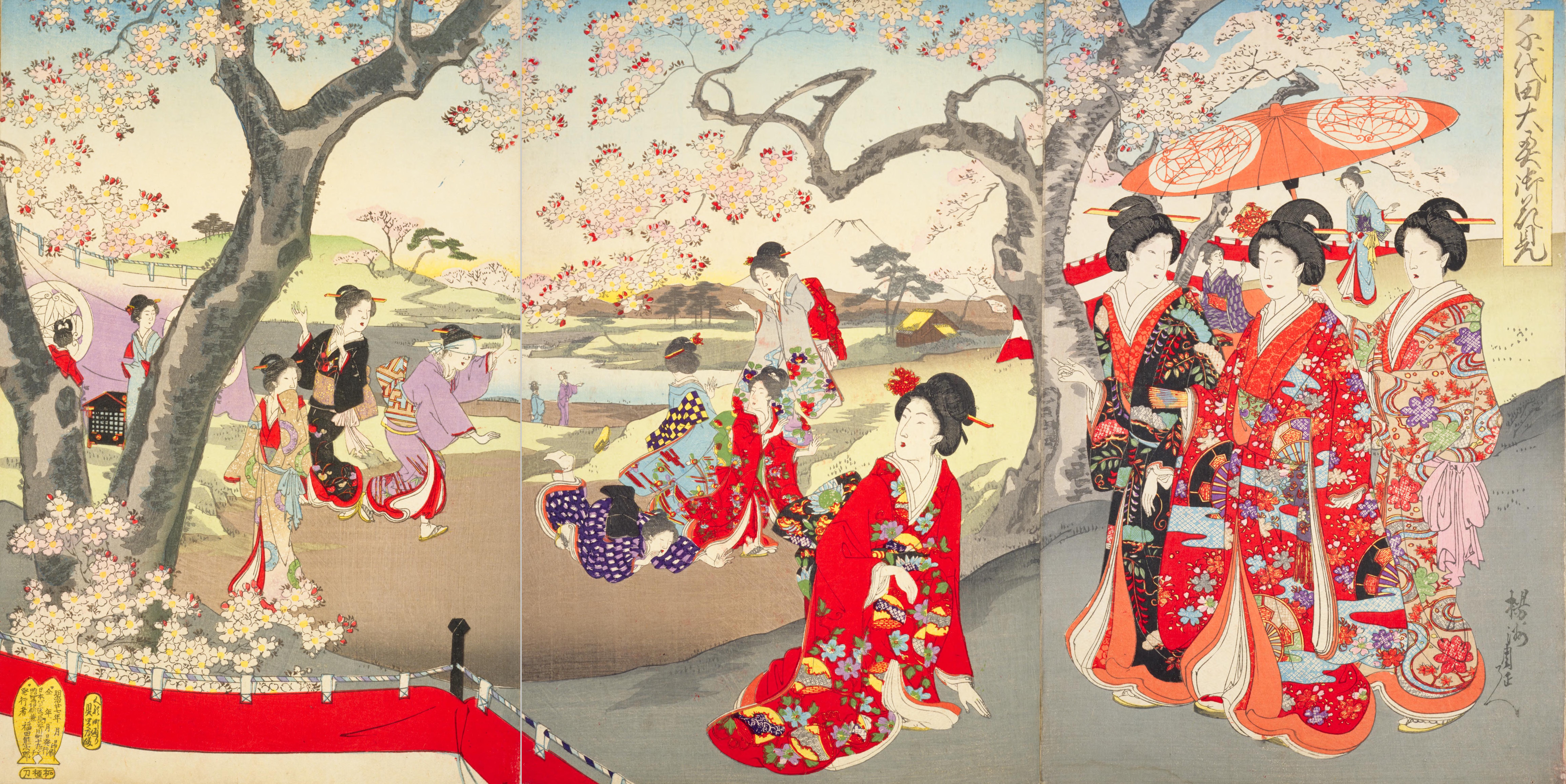
Women of the Ōoku enjoy cherry blossoms at a hanami. Moku-hanga in the ukiyo-e style (by Toyohara Chikanobu, 1894)

The women's quarters included the shōgun's mother, the official wife (seishitsu), and concubines. Rumored to house several thousand women, including maids and servants at one point, the Ōoku was, as much as any other part of Edo Castle, a focal point of political intrigue for the Tokugawa shogunate.

A lady in the rank of an Otoshiyori (御年寄) or Jōrō Otoshiyori (上臈御年寄) or the senior ladyship held the reins of power in the Ōoku, while attaining the influence equivalent to a Rōjū in Edo Castle.

Position	Duties
Jorō O-toshiyori (上臈御年寄)	Took orders from the midaidokoro and gave her counsel; Usually a woman who was from a respected and noble family
O-toshiyori (御年寄)	The court lady who runs the Ōoku; Held authority similar to the Rōjū in Edo Castle
O-kyaku-ashirai (御客応答)	Responsible for receiving ambassadors from various daimyo
Chū-doshiyori (中年寄)	Took orders from the o-toshiyori; Did everything from menu checking to poison tasting
Chūrō (中臈)	Personal assistant of the Shogun and his wife; Usually women of good social standing and good caliber were chosen; Concubines could be chosen from these women
O-koshō (御小姓)	Midaidokoro’s handmaid and page; Many were young girls between the ages of 7 and 16
O-jōguchi (御錠口)	Responsible for managing the locks on the gates between the Ōoku and Naka-oku
Omote-zukai (表使)	Under the orders of the o-toshiyori, in charge of requesting the Hiroshiki-yonin (広敷用人) to procure supplies
Go-yūhitsu (御右筆)	Responsible for managing all official documents from diaries to letters; Also in charge of inspecting gifts from the various daimyo
O-tsugi (御次)	Responsible for transporting meals and various tools; Responsible for cleaning meeting places
Kittegai (切手書)	Responsible for renewing a certificate that visitors needed in order to enter from one of the seven gates
Gofukunoma (呉服之間)	Responsible for the clothes and wardrobe of the Shogun and midaidokoro
O-bōzu (御坊主)	Responsible for the Shogun’s miscellaneous affairs; Usually women in their middle ages adorning haori hakama and wearing their hair in the tonsure style; Occasionally going in and out of the Naka-oku
O-hirozashiki (御広座敷)	Underlings of the omote-zukai; In charge of the meals for the ambassadors that visited the Ōoku
O-sannoma (御三之間)	Responsible for the cleaning of the three sections of Honmaru Palace
O-nakai (御仲居)	Responsible for cooking all the meals
Hinoban (火之番)	Patrolled the ''Ōoku'' around the clock for any potential fire outbreak; Excelled at martial arts and also served as a security guard
O-chanoma (御茶之間)	Responsible for bringing out the midaidokoro’s tea
O-tsukaiban (御使番)	Responsible for the opening and closing of the lock between the hiroshiki and the palace
O-hashita/O-sue (御半下/御末)	A maid servant responsible for taking care of the miscellaneous chores in the ''Ōoku''

== Notable persons ==
- Kasuga no Tsubone, shōgun Tokugawa Iemitsu's wet nurse. She became the first Jōrō Otoshiyori in 1607 after being recommended by the first Midaidokoro, Oeyo. She managed the Ōoku with Oeyo from 1607 until Oeyo died in 1626, and then with Oman no Kata from 1640 until her death in 1643.
- Oman no Kata, the first concubine named a Jōrō Otoshiyori. She later acted as adoptive mother to two of Iemitsu's children, Chiyohime and Tokugawa Ietsuna, the fourth shogun. She was a concubine of Tokugawa Iemitsu and retired in March 1657.
- Yajima no Tsubone, shōgun Tokugawa Ietsuna's wet nurse. She became the third Jōrō Otoshiyori in 1656 after Oman no Kata's retirement, and later was banished from Ōoku in 1675 after her plots against several of the other women of the Ōoku were discovered by Ietsuna:
  - In 1675, she poisoned the powder used by Asa no Miya Akiko, which blinded her; the resulting stress contributed to her death a year later.
  - In 1667 she poisoned the lipstick of Ofuri no Kata, who was then pregnant; Ofuri suffered a miscarriage and died soon after. Yajima's motive in poisoning Ofuri was to allow her daughter to become the mother of Ietsuna's sole heir, but this was not to be as her daughter also later miscarried after falling down the stairs.
- Lady Emonnosuke, the second and last concubine to be named Jōrō Otoshiyori, and the concubine of Tokugawa Tsunayoshi from 1683 until her death in January 1705.
- Lady Akimoto, who became Jōrō Otoshiyori in 1705 after the death of Lady Emonnosuke. She retired in 1709.
- Ejima, Jōrō Otoshiyori and the personal ladyship of Gekkoin, mother of seventh shōgun. Held the office from 1709 until 1714. She was expelled from Ōoku in 1714 due to her relationship with a man named Ikushima Shingoro.This tragedy came to be known as Ejima-Ikushima affair.
- Fujinami, Jōrō Otoshiyori and the personal ladyship of Ten'ei-in, widow of the sixth shogun. In office beginning in 1714.
- Lady Takaoka, Jōrō Otoshiyori during the reign of Tokugawa Ieharu. In office from 1765 to 1787.
- Lady Anekoji (1810–1880), Jōrō Otoshiyori from the reign of Tokugawa Ienari until that of Tokugawa Ieyoshi. In office from 1826 to 1844.
- Lady Utahashi, wet nurse of Tokugawa Iesada, personal ladyship of Lady Honjuin (mother of Iesada) and Jōrō Otoshiyori during the reign of Tokugawa Ieyoshi. In office from 1844 to 1853.
- Ikushima, the personal ladyship of Tenshōin. She retired from the Ōoku at 1859 and stayed with Muraoka, the senior ladyship of the Konoe family, until her death. She was buried at Satsuma.
- Niwata Tsuguko of Kyoto, the personal ladyship of Princess Kazunomiya, Iemochi's wife. She died 1868 in the Ōoku.
- Takiyama (1805–1876), the Jōrō Otoshiyori. She served the previous shōgun, including Tokugawa Iesada and Atsuhime/Tenshōin, Tokugawa Iemochi and Kazunomiya/Seikan'in-no miya, and the last shōgun Tokugawa Yoshinobu. After a new government took over Edo Castle, she moved to Kawaguchi in Saitama Prefecture. Her remains were buried in Shakujo-ji Temple. In office from 1853 to 1867.

== In popular culture ==
No painting exists of the interior. Ukiyo-e artists such as Hashimoto Chikanobu and Toyohara Chikanobu created a number of prints that depict life as imagined inside the women's quarters. However, there are many modern popular portrayals of the Ōoku:

- Ōoku, a 1983 51-episode TV series
- Ōoku: Hana no Ran, a Japanese television drama running between 2003–2006
- Ōoku: The Inner Chambers, a manga series running between 2004–2022
- Oh! Oku, a 2006 film
- Atsuhime, a 2008 NHK Taiga drama
- Mononoke the Movie: Phantom in the Rain, a 2024 animated movie

== Notes ==
The name and title of "Ōoku" was given by Oeyo, Tokugawa Hidetada's wife
Her name before Iemitsu become the third shōgun
her name after Iemitsu become the third shōgun
