= Military Comfort Women =

Military Comfort Women may refer to:

- Military Comfort Women (book), a book by Kakou Senda
- Military Comfort Women (film), a 1974 film based on the book

== See also ==
- Korean comfort women (disambiguation)
- Comfort Woman Statue (disambiguation)
- Comfort station (disambiguation)
- Comfort women, women and girls forced into sexual slavery by the Imperial Japanese Army
