= Ichijō Mikako =

Japanese noble woman, and wife of Tokugawa Yoshinobu

Tokugawa Mikako 徳川 美賀子
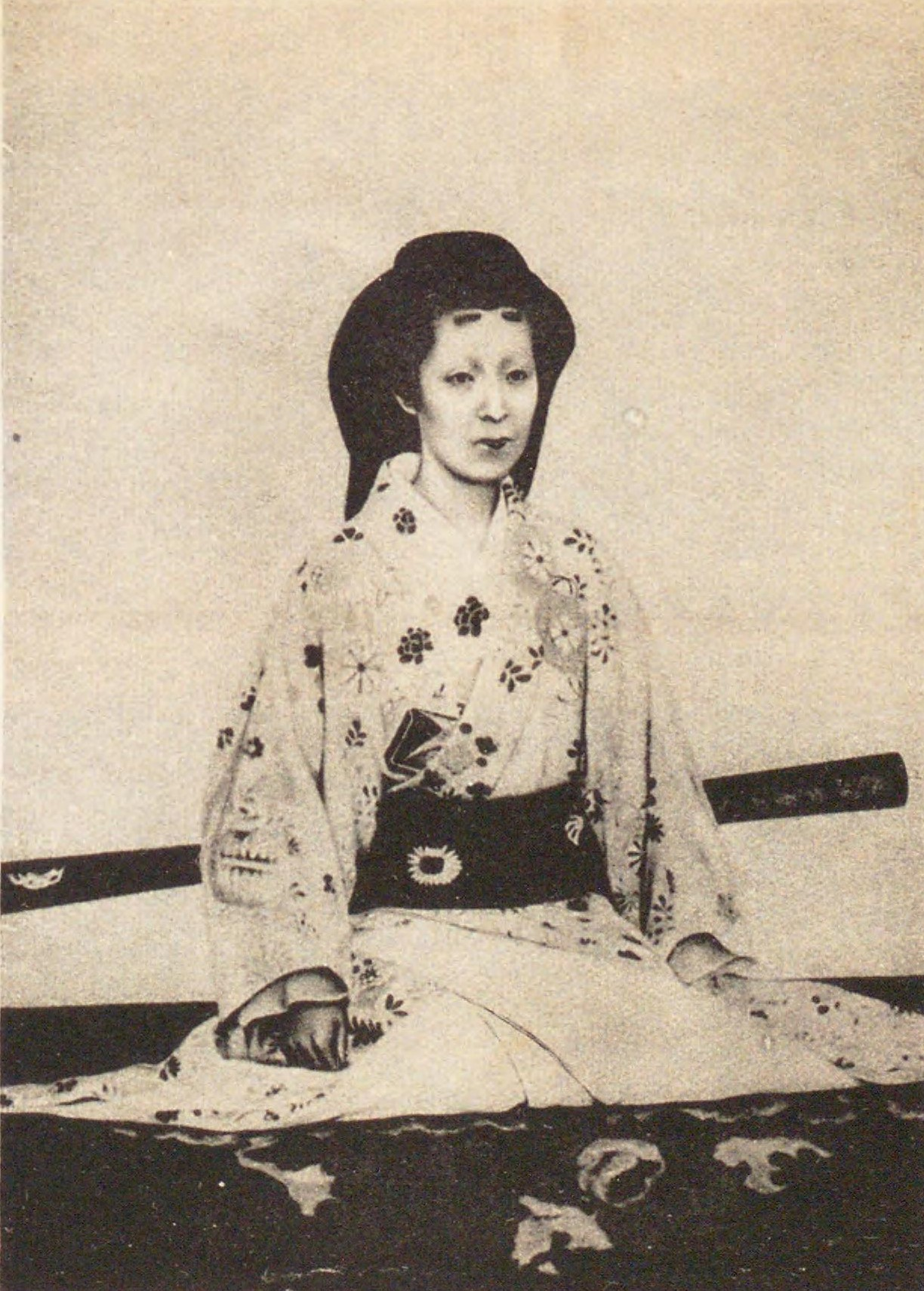

Gorenju
- Tenure: 29 August 1866 – 19 November 1867
- Predecessor: Chikako, Princess Kazu (as Midaidokoro)
- Successor: Position abolished
- Born: 11 September 1835
- Died: 9 July 1894 (aged 58); Tokugawa family residence
- Cause of death: Breast cancer
- Burial: Yanaka Cemetery
- Spouse: Tokugawa Yoshinobu
- Issue: Kyokoin Tonoike Mizukage Gendaidōjō and at least two other daughters
- House: Branch of the Northern Fujiwara (by birth); Tokugawa clan (by marriage)
- Father: Imadegawa Kinhisa

Ichijō Mikako (一条美賀子; later Tokugawa Mikako 徳川 美賀子) was a Japanese noble woman and wife to Tokugawa Yoshinobu. She and the shōgun had at least three children.

== Early life ==
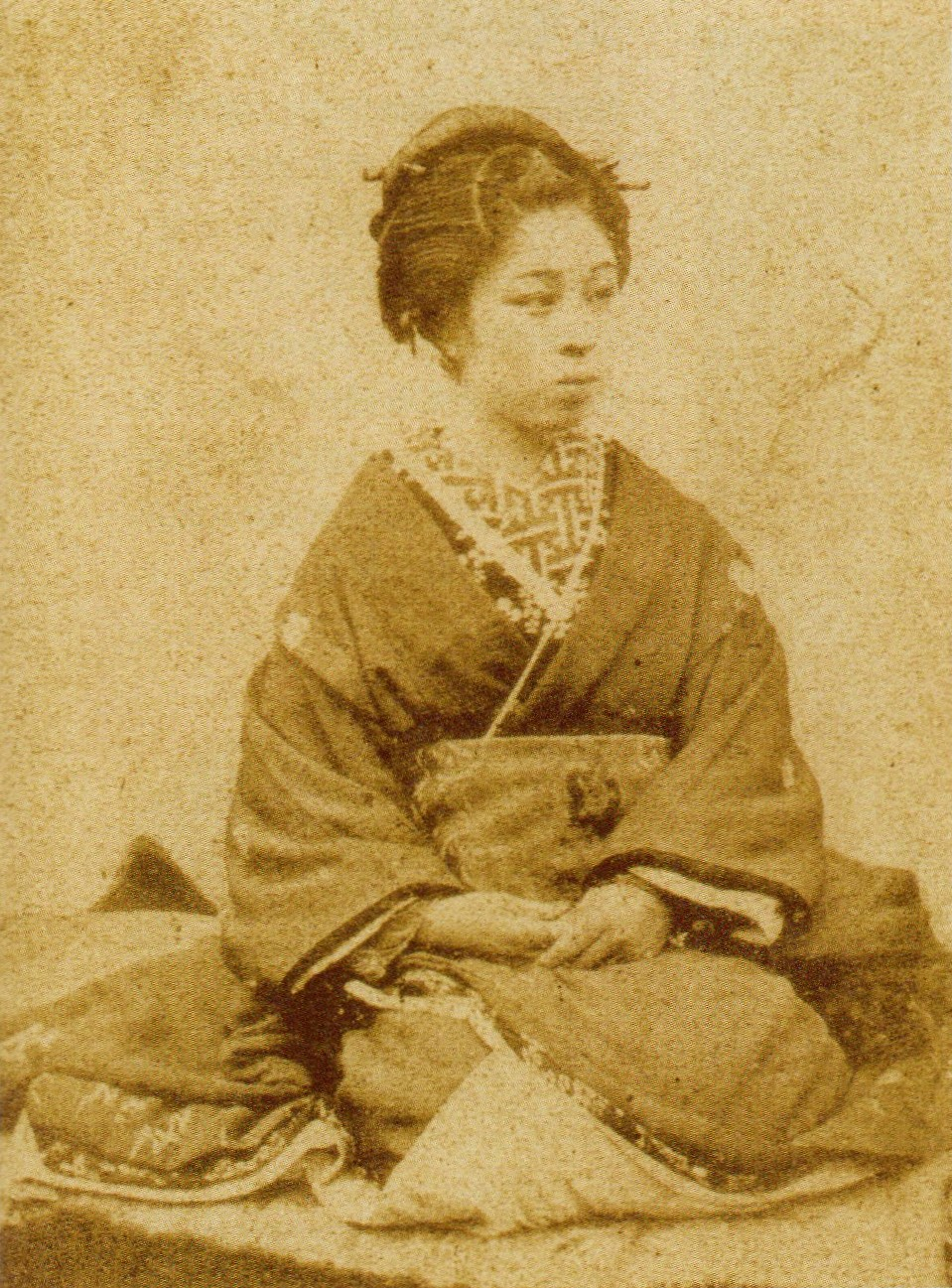
Mikako pictured in 1850.

Ichijō Mikako was born the daughter of Imadegawa Kinhisa on September 11, 1835. Shortly after her birth, her father died. Originally, a man named Ichijō Tadaka's daughter, Teruko, was supposed to marry Tokugawa Yoshinobu, but Teruko contracted smallpox and the marriage was called off. Tadaka quickly adopted Mikako as his own and engaged her to Yoshinobu.

== Marriage and life as the shōgun's wife ==
Mikako was wed in 1855 and became pregnant in 1858. She gave birth to a daughter, however her daughter soon died. She would go on to have at least 2 other daughters, all dying young. After a suspected relationship between Yoshinobu and another woman, Mikako became depressed and tried to commit suicide, however this failed. Soon later, Yoshinobu became the guardian of the shōgun, Tokugawa Iemochi and as such the couple did not live together. Yoshinobu finally became shōgun in August 1866, yet she still did not live with him as she did not move to the Ōoku in Edo Castle. In 1867 the Meiji Restoration bought an end to shōgunate rule, and Mikako's title was officially defined as Gorenju.

== Post shōgunate ==
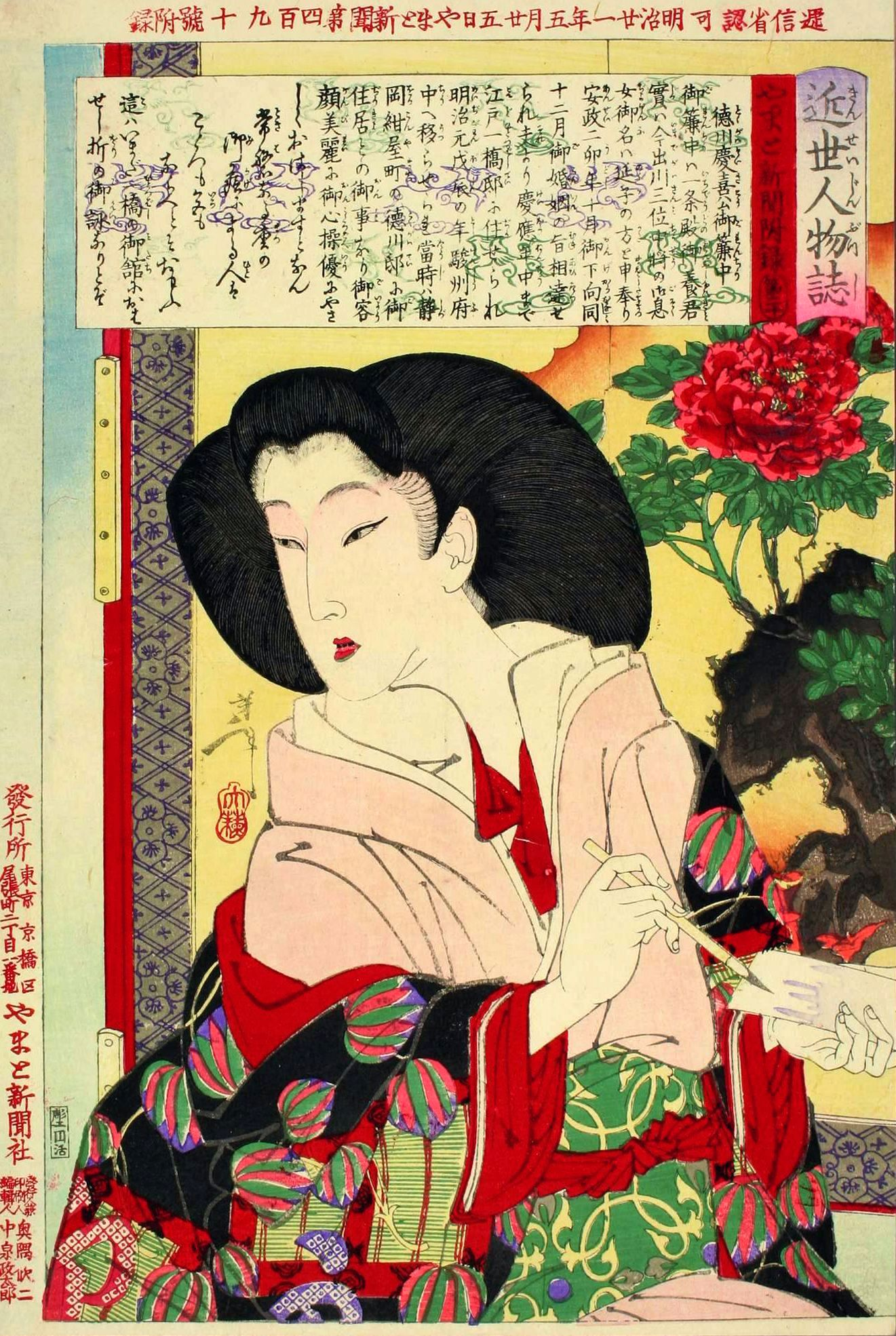
A woodblock painting of Mikako from 1888 by Tsukioka Yoshitoshi.

Following the Meiji restoration, Yoshinobu lived in confinement and Mikako was never allowed to see him. After being released from house arrest in 1869, Yoshinobu built a new home for himself, and for the first time in 10 years, the couple lived together.

== Later years and death ==
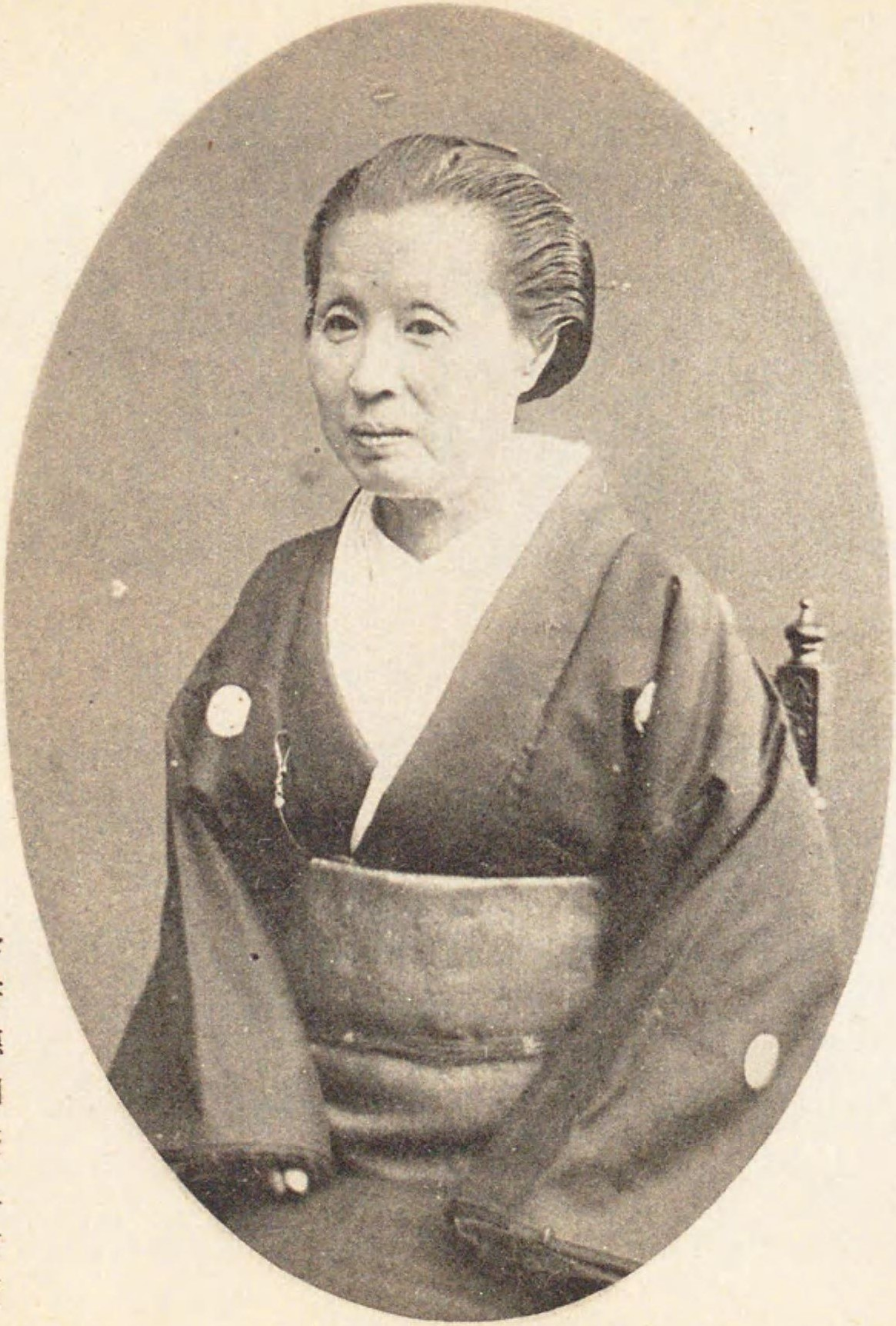
Mikako in her later years.

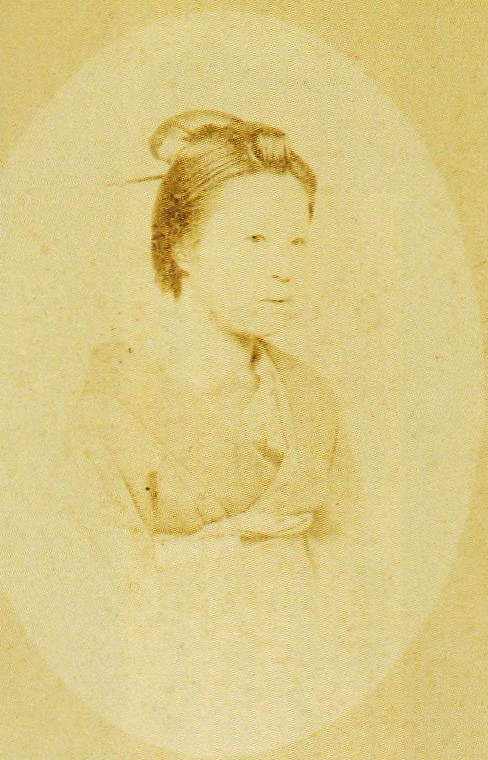
Mikako photographed four years before her death.

Mikako lived a very private life. However, in 1894, she was diagnosed with breast cancer and so moved into the Tokugawa family home, where she received treatment by Ryoun Takamatsu. The surgery did very little to help her, and on July 9, 1894, she died from her illness. Before her death, she composed a death poem;

On the road where we parted ways
The lingering traces of our love
Like white snow on the roadside
