= Comfort station =

Comfort station may refer to:

- a euphemism for public toilet
- a euphemism for rest area
- Comfort Station No. 68, a public toilet in Oregon
- Comfort Station No. 72, a public toilet in Oregon
- Comfort Station, a public toilet in Milton, Massachusetts
- a brothel used in the context of comfort women serving the Japanese military 1931–1945

== See also ==
- Military Comfort Women (disambiguation)
- Korean comfort women (disambiguation)
