= Korean comfort women =

Korean comfort women may refer to:

- Comfort women from Korea ruled by the Japanese Empire (before 1945)
- Western princess in South Korea (after 1945)
- Korean Women's Volunteer Labour Corps (Korean:조선여자근로정신대), mistranslated as Korean comfort women corps

== See also ==
- Military Comfort Women (disambiguation)
- Comfort Woman Statue (disambiguation)
- Comfort station (disambiguation)
