= Comfort Woman Statue =

Comfort Woman Statue may refer to:

- Statue of Peace, a statue in Seoul, South Korea
- Filipina Comfort Women, a statue that was erected in Manila, Philippines
- San Francisco Comfort Women Memorial, a statue installed in San Francisco, US

== See also ==
- Military Comfort Women (disambiguation)
- Korean comfort women (disambiguation)
