= Ōoku (1983 TV series) =

Japanese TV series

- Genre: Jidaigeki
- Written by: Takayuki Yamada
- Directed by: Junji Kurata
- Starring: Komaki Kurihara; Keiko Tsushima; Tomisaburo Wakayama; Katsuo Nakamura; Haruko Kato; Masaya Oki; Ryoko Sakaguchi; Misako Konno; Chikage Awashima; Kenici Kaneda; Mieko Takamine; Yoshiko Tanaka; Mitsuko Kusabue; Masahiko Tsugawa; Shigeru Tsuyuguchi; Yoko Tsukasa; Meiko Kaji; Tetsuro Tamba
- Theme music composer: Takeo Watanabe
- Ending theme: "Aio no Makugire" was sung by Ryoko Moriyama
- Country of origin: Japan
- Original language: Japanese
- No. of episodes: 51

Production
- Running time: 45 minutes
- Production companies: Toei,Kansai TV

Original release
- Release: April 5, 1983 – March 27, 1984

Ōoku (大奥) is a 1983 Japanese Jidaigeki television series. The story is set in whole Edo period in Ōoku and is fiction set against a background of historical fact. The Ōoku was where thousands of women work for one Tokugawa shogun and the part the ladies lived in Edo Castle.

== Cast ==
=== Tokugawa shogun and people of Ōoku ===
- Komaki Kurihara as Oeyo (episode1-3,50,51)
- Tomisaburo Wakayama as Tokugawa Ieyasu (episode1-2)
- Katsuo Nakamura as Tokugawa Hidetada (episode1-3,8)
- Masaya Oki as Tokugawa Iemitsu (episode3-8,10,11,13)
- Naoko Otani / Misako Watanabe as Lady Kasuga
- Mieko Takamine as Sosinni
- Haruko Kato as Senhime (episode14-16)
- Mitsuko Kusabue as Asukai (episode14-16)
- Ken Tanaka as Tokugawa Ietsuna (episode14-16)
- Masahiko Tsugawa as Tokugawa Tsunayoshi (episode18-20,22,23,25,26)
- Yoko Tsukasa as Nobuko (episode18,19,21,-23,25,26)
- Meiko Kaji as Uemonnosuke no Tsubone (episode22.23)
- Shigeru Tsuyuguchi as Tokugawa Ienobu (episode26-29)
- Ayumi Ishida / Kyoko Enami as Gekkoin
- Isuzu Yamada as Yuri (episode33,34)
- Takeshi Kaga as Tokugawa Yoshimune (episode31-37,39)
- Toshiyuki Hosokawa as Tokugawa Ieharu
- Tetsuro Tamba as Tokugawa Ienari (episode43)
- Gaku Yamamoto as Tokugawa Yoshinobu

=== Others ===
- Akiko Koyama as Yodo-dono (episode1)
- Kenichi Kaneda as Tokugawa Tadanaga
- Eitaro Ozawa as Tokugawa Mitsukuni
- Mikijiro Hira as Matsudaira Nobutsuna (episode14)
- Shigeru Kōyama as Sakai Tadakiyo (episode18)
- Takahiro Tamura as Makino Narisada (episode20)
- Akira Kume as Ando Tsushima
- Teruhiko Aoi (episode18,19,22,25,26)
- So Yamamura as Arai Hakuseki(episode27-29)
- Shigeru Amachi as Manabe Akifusa (episode27,28, 31-34)
- Yoshio Inaba as Arima Ujinori (episode37)
- Kojiro Hongo as Ōoka Tadasuke (episode39)
- Teruhiko Saigo as Abe Masahiro (episode45)
- Asao Koike as Ii Naosuke
- Hiroki Matsukata as Kirino Toshiaki (episode50,51)

=== Fictional Characters ===
- Keiko Takahashi as Ohatsu
- Yōko Nogiwa as Otowa (episode17)
- Misako Tanaka as Okin
- Kantaro Suga as Sekine Rokubei
- Mieko Harada as Takigawa
- Kumi Mizuno as Sakon (episode38)
- Shinjirō Ehara as Yamauchi Iganosuke
- Hiroshi Koizumi (episode46)
- Renji Ishibashi as Ginzo (episode46)
- Yutaka Nakajima as Awashima (episode50,51)
