= Military Comfort Women (film) =

Military Comfort Women (従軍慰安婦 Jūgun-ianfu)
- Directed by: Ryuichi Takamori (鷹森立一)
- Screenplay by: Teruo Ishii
- Story by: Kakou Senda
- Music by: Toshiaki Tsushima
- Distributed by: Toei Company
- Release date: July 17, 1974
- Running time: 86 minutes
- Country: Japan
- Language: Japanese

Military Comfort Women (従軍慰安婦, Jūgun-ianfu), is a Japanese 1974 film directed by Ryūichi Takamori, and starring Yutaka Nakajima, Mako Midori. It was written by Teruo Ishii based on Kakou Senda's book of the same title.

== Plot ==
The film depicts the sad love story of a woman (Akiko) who becomes a military comfort woman.

== Cast ==
- Yutaka Nakajima as Akiko
- Mako Midori as Fusa
- Hideo Murota as Shimodate
- Akira Kume
- Nenji Kobayashi
