= Chikako, Princess Kazu =

Japanese princess (1846–1877)

Chikako
- Princess Kazu
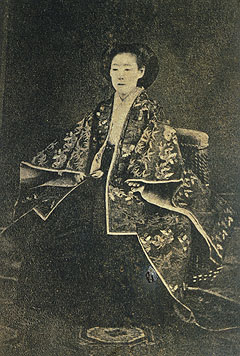

Midaidokoro
- Predecessor: Tenshō-in
- Successor: Ichijō Mikako
- Born: 1 August 1846; Kyoto, Japan
- Died: 2 September 1877 (aged 31); Hakone, Japan
- Spouse: Tokugawa Iemochi
Names
- 和宮 親子内親王
- House: Imperial House of Japan
- Father: Emperor Ninkō
- Mother: Hashimoto Tsuneko

Chikako, Princess Kazu (和宮 親子内親王, Kazu-no-miya Chikako naishinnō; 1 August 1846 – 2 September 1877) (Kazunomiya) was the wife of 14th shōgun Tokugawa Iemochi. She was renamed Lady Seikan'in-no-miya after she took the tonsure as a widow. Chikako was the youngest child of Emperor Ninkō.

== Biography ==
Her birth name was Chikako. She was the eighth and youngest daughter of Emperor Ninkō, and was renamed Kangyō'in (観行院) by his concubine, Hashimoto Tsuneko , after she took the tonsure. She was the younger half-sister of Emperor Kōmei.

A few months before her birth, her father, Emperor Ninkō, died unexpectedly. Born on 1 August 1846, her official birth date was changed to 10 May because the actual birth date was a bad omen date, and a double bad omen with the death of her father a few months before.

She was known as an excellent calligrapher and she was also highly regarded as a waka poet.

=== Family ===
- Father: Emperor Ninkō
- Mother: Hashimoto Tsuneko (1825–1865)
- Husband: Tokugawa Iemochi
- Adopted son: Tokugawa Iesato

=== Marriage ===
In 1851, Chikako was engaged to Prince Arisugawa Taruhito (有栖川宮熾仁親王). However, this engagement was subsequently broken when the Imperial court needed someone for a political marriage with the Tokugawa shogunate. Such a marriage had been arranged by the rōjū Andō Nobumasa and Kuze Hirochika in order to foster reconciliation between the Imperial court and the shogunate, but the original candidate for the marriage died in 1861. Subsequently, the Shogunate petitioned the court for a royal marriage between Princess Kazu and Shogun Tokugawa Iemochi.

Initially, Princess Kazu refused, and her brother Emperor Kōmei declined the shogunate request stating that Kazu was already engaged and did not want to leave Kyoto, and that, like any woman in Japan, his own sister could not be compelled to marry anyone she did not wish to marry, even by Imperial order. However, the proposal was taken up enthusiastically by a number of people, including Princess Kazu's mother and uncle as well as several prominent kuge at the Imperial court, who persuaded both the Emperor and Princess Kazu to acquiesce to the request. Eventually Emperor Kōmei was persuaded to accept the proposal if, in return, the shogunate would repudiate the Treaty of Amity and Commerce with the United States, and return to the previous isolationist policy.

It was then resolved that if Princess Kazu continued to refuse to accept the marriage, Emperor Kōmei would abdicate, another member of the Imperial family would be chosen instead, and that Princess Kazu would have to become a nun. Under pressure from her family, unwilling to be responsible for Emperor Kōmei's abdication and threatened with the monastery, Princess Kazu finally agreed, but gave several conditions including demands that her lifestyle in Edo would remain the same as in Kyoto and that she would be able to return to Kyoto on the anniversaries of her father's death. Emperor Kōmei would also add the conditions that the Shogunate must deliver on its promises on foreign affairs, work out a strategy to improve the livelihood of artisans unable to compete with cheap foreign imports, and that Princess Kazu's conditions must be met. Emperor Kōmei would then make his sister a naishinnō (imperial princess of a shinnōke).

In 1862, Chikako, her mother Kangyō-in, and her chief attendant Niwata Tsuguko moved to Edo Castle with a number of attendants. Due to concerns over attacks by those against the Tokugawa shogunate's policies, security forces from dozens of hans were mobilised to protect the procession. In addition, rumours that the support in the court for Princess Kazu's unprecedented marriage was the result of Tokugawa bribery and scheme to hold an Imperial Princess hostage led Emperor Kōmei to send Iwakura Tomomi to safeguard the court's interests. Iwakura would force the shōgun to put a vow of loyalty to paper before returning to Kyoto.

The marriage ceremony was held on 11 February 1862. This ceremony differed from that of all previous Tokugawa shōguns: having been made a naishinnō by her brother before leaving Kyoto, Kazu now outranked her husband as well as her mother-in-law, Tenshō-in. Furthermore, Princess Kazu retained the customs of the Imperial palace, which caused considerable friction with Lady Tenshō-in. However, she apparently enjoyed such a good relationship with her husband that they are usually called the closest couple out of all the Tokugawa shōguns, and Iemochi only once took a concubine, which the princess gave him permission to do. Eventually Tenshō-in would reconcile with Princess Kazu, and the bakufu submitted to her order to address her as "Kazu-no-Miya-sama", as opposed to the traditional "Midai-sama".

=== Buddhist nun ===
A series of tragedies hit Princess Kazu between 1865 and 1867. Her mother, who followed her to Edo to keep her company, died on 10 August 1865, followed by her husband shōgun Iemochi, who died in Osaka while commanding the Chōshū Expedition on 20 July 1866. She became a Buddhist nun, receiving the title of Seikan'in-no-miya (静寛院宮) on 9 December 1866, but just a few weeks later her brother Emperor Komei would also pass away.

The death of Shogun Iemochi put an end to their very short marriage, and the couple did not have any children. When Iemochi's will to have Tokugawa Iesato succeed him arrived in Edo, the rōjū consulted her and Tenshō-in, voicing opposition to having someone so young as shōgun during such turbulent times, Seikan'in and Tenshō-in instead supported Tokugawa Yoshinobu, who would become the last Tokugawa Shogun. However their relationship quickly turned sour as public opinion turned against Yoshinobu.

During the Meiji Restoration, Seikanin and Tenshō-in helped negotiate for the peaceful surrender of Edo Castle by restraining extremists of both sides. They were therefore instrumental in maintaining the lineage of the Tokugawa family. After the shogunal surrender, Seikanin briefly returned to Kyoto. But after Emperor Meiji moved the capital to Tokyo (the former Edo), he and her uncle persuaded Seikanin to join them there.

Seikan'in arrived in Tokyo in 1874 and she took up residence in the home of Katsu Kaishū, in the mansion in Azabu ichibei-cho. She remained there until her death in 1877 of beriberi, at the young age of 31. Her grave is at Zōjō-ji, in Minato, Tokyo. After World War II, her tomb was excavated for reburial. A photographic plate of a man in traditional hitatare and a tachi-eboshi was found on her person. The image on the plate disappeared the following day, however, perhaps due to improper handling. As a result, the identity of the male is unknown. Although it is generally believed to have been of her husband, Tokugawa Iemochi, it has also been suggested that it could have been of her former fiancé, Prince Arisugawa Taruhito. The body of Iemochi was found. An old tradition was if the husband died, his wife would cut a piece of her hair, and the hair would be buried with her husband, but the hair that was buried with Iemochi was not Kazunomiya's.

There is a legend that Princess Kazu gave one of her ladies-in-waiting to Iemochi as a concubine, named Sachi. Sachi followed the shōgun to Kyoto and Osaka, but one year after Iemochi's death, Sachi was murdered by a samurai from Satsuma who believed her to be Princess Kazu.

== In popular culture ==
The exhumation of Princess Kazunomiya's remains, together with the story of the mysterious fading photograph that was found with her, was referenced in Yasunari Kawabata's 1961 novel Beauty and Sadness.

Princess Kazunomiya was portrayed by Yumi Adachi in the 2003 Fuji TV miniseries Ōoku.

She appeared in the manga Jin and its TV series, where she was one of the patients saved by Jin Minakata and his medical knowledge.
