= Yutaka Nakajima =

Japanese actress (1952–2025)

- 中島ゆたか
- Born: 5 October 1952; Mito, Ibaraki, Japan
- Died: 27 November 2025 (aged 73); Kanagawa Prefecture, Japan
- Occupation: Actor
- Years active: 1972–2025

Yutaka Nakajima (中島ゆたか, Nakajima Yutaka; 5 October 1952 – 27 November 2025) was a Japanese actress. She appeared in more than 30 films from 1977. Nakajima died from colorectal cancer on 27 November 2025, at the age of 73.

== Selected filmography ==
Year	Title	Role	Notes
1974	The Street Fighter	Sarai Chuayut-Hammett	
1974	Military Comfort Women	Akiko	
1974	Executioner		
1975	Karate Bearfighter		
1979	The Resurrection of the Golden Wolf		
1982	Seishun no mon: Jiritsu hen	Riko Hayase	
1982	Yogoreta eiyû	Kazuko Kawai	
1985	Barrow Gang BC	Etsuko Hashimoto	
1987	Gokudo no onna-tachi 2	Tomoko Kameda	
1987	Code Name Black Cat o oe	Kumiko Shimizu	
1992	Nanmin rodo		
2001	Tomie: Re-birth	Tomoko Hosoda	
