= Kakou Senda =

Japanese writer (1924–2000)

Kakō Senda
- 千田夏光
- Born: August 28, 1924; Dalian
- Died: December 22, 2000 (aged 76)
- Occupations: Journalist, writer
- Writing career
- Language: Japanese
- Subject: Comfort women
- Notable work: Military Comfort Women (従軍慰安婦 Jūgun-ianfu)

Kakou Senda (千田 夏光, Senda Kakō; August 28, 1924 – December 22, 2000) was a Japanese writer who is known for writing one of the first books on comfort women in Japan. Born in Dalian, Kwantung Leased Territory (then part of the Empire of Japan) he wrote Military Comfort Women (従軍慰安婦, Jūgun-ianfu) in 1973.

== History ==
As a reporter for Mainichi Shinbun (a major newspaper in Japan), Kakou Senda first encountered photographs of comfort women in 1962 while working on Nihon no Senreki, a book that chronicled photographs from World War II. The photograph had been among a collection of 25,000 censored wartime photographs. The explanations connected with the pictures did not explain who these women were. When Senda pursued further investigation, he learned of the jūgun-ianfu for the first time, leading him to investigate the comfort system as a whole. Senda faced difficulties in finding people willing to share information regarding the comfort women until he met Aso Tetsuo, a former army doctor. During the war, Aso Tetsuo had examined the women for venereal disease and not surprisingly, proclaimed the young Korean girls to be much healthier than the Japanese prostitutes. Based on his research of soldier-comfort women ratios, Senda estimated that there that number of comfort women was over 100,000. Drawing on interviews with Japanese military veterans, Korean men, and others in addition to relevant publications, Senda published his book Military Comfort Women (従軍慰安婦, Jūgun-ianfu) in 1973. Through the introduction of a fellow journalist, Senda was able to meet a former comfort woman but when asked the details of her experience, she remained silent.

Although his book Military Comfort Women was a "hidden" best-seller among scholars, it did not gain widespread public attention. Soon after his book was published, it was quickly made into a film by Toei Company. Even the film did not draw much attention to the issue of comfort women. The comfort women issue only gained international attention when Kim Hak-sun came forth with her story in 1991.

=== Jūgun-ianfu ===
The term jūgun-ianfu literally means "comfort women who followed or accompanied the troops." Some researchers have claimed that this word only became commonly used after Senda published his book with that title; however, other sources show that women were called jūgun-ianfu during the war. The phrase "comfort women" is derived from this word.

Defenders of former comfort women who are seeking retribution from the Japanese government dislike the connotation of the word jūgun-ianfu. Many former comfort women themselves feel that the euphemistic phrase, along with its English counterpart, disguises the truth. The term has become contentious among the public as usage has grown to be common. Various phrases have been suggested, such as "sex slaves" or "victims of forced prostitution."

== Selected list of works ==
- Military Comfort Women (従軍慰安婦 Jūgun-ianfu), Futabasha (1973). Subtitle was "Accuse of 80000 people, No voice of women" (声なき女"八万人の告発).
- Military Comfort Women (1974 film) (従軍慰安婦 Jūgun-ianfu), Toei Company (1974)
