= Fall of Edo =

1868 event of the Boshin War

- Part of the Boshin War
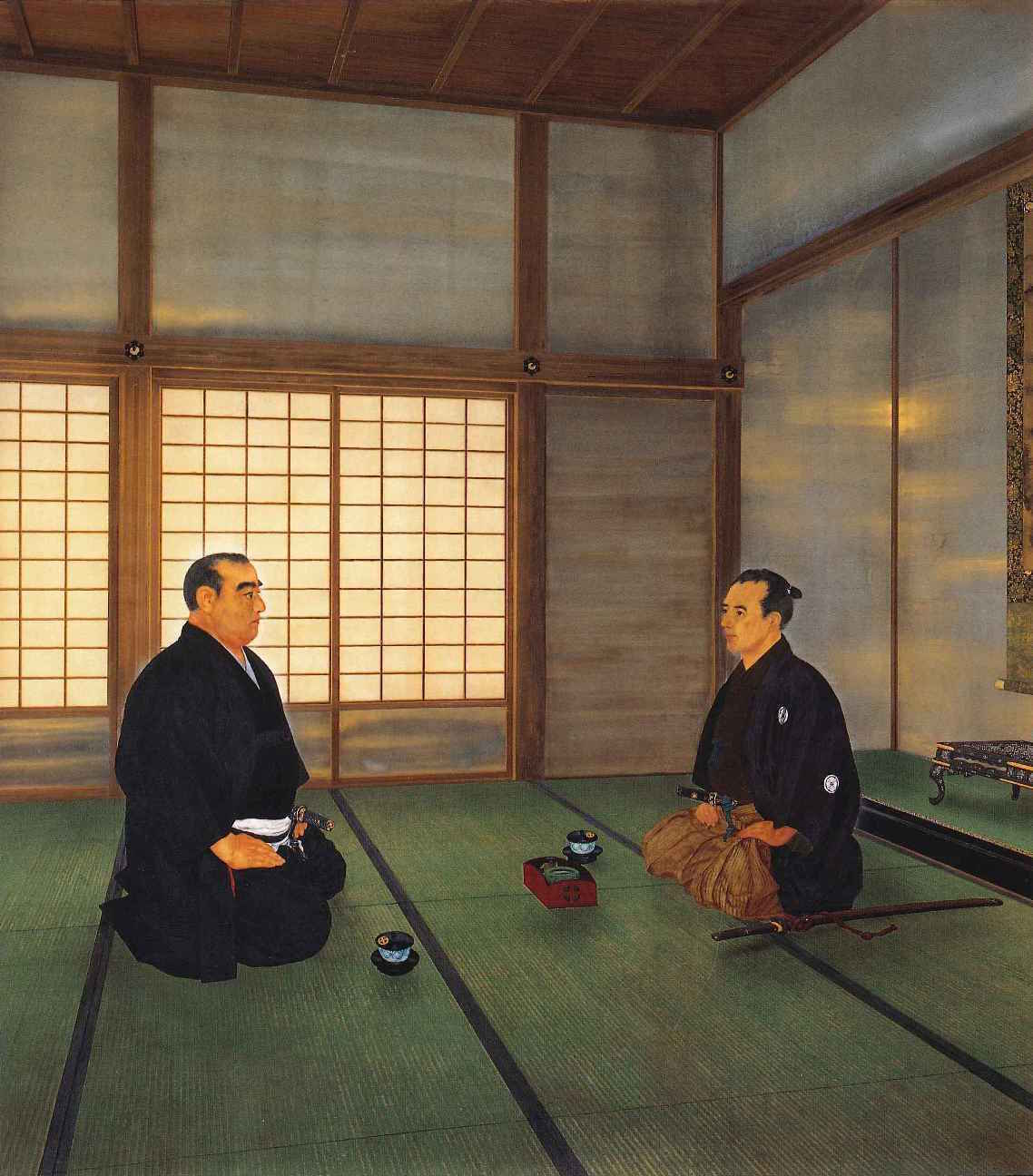
- Negotiations between Saigō Takamori and Katsu Kaishū regarding the surrender of the capital, painted by Yūki Somei, 1935
Date	July 1868
Location	Edo
Result	Surrender of Edo Castle

The Fall of Edo (Japanese: 江戸開城, Hepburn: Edo Kaijō), also known as Edojō Akewatashi (江戸城明け渡し, Evacuation of Edo Castle) and Edo Muketsu Kaijō (江戸無血開城, Bloodless Opening of Edo Castle), took place in May and July 1868, when Edo (modern Tokyo), where the Tokugawa shogunate was based, fell to forces favorable to the restoration of Emperor Meiji during the Boshin War.

Saigō Takamori, leading the victorious imperial forces north and east through Japan, had won the Battle of Kōshū-Katsunuma in the approaches to the capital. He was eventually able to surround Edo in May 1868.

Katsu Kaishū, the shōgun's Army Minister, negotiated the surrender, which was unconditional.

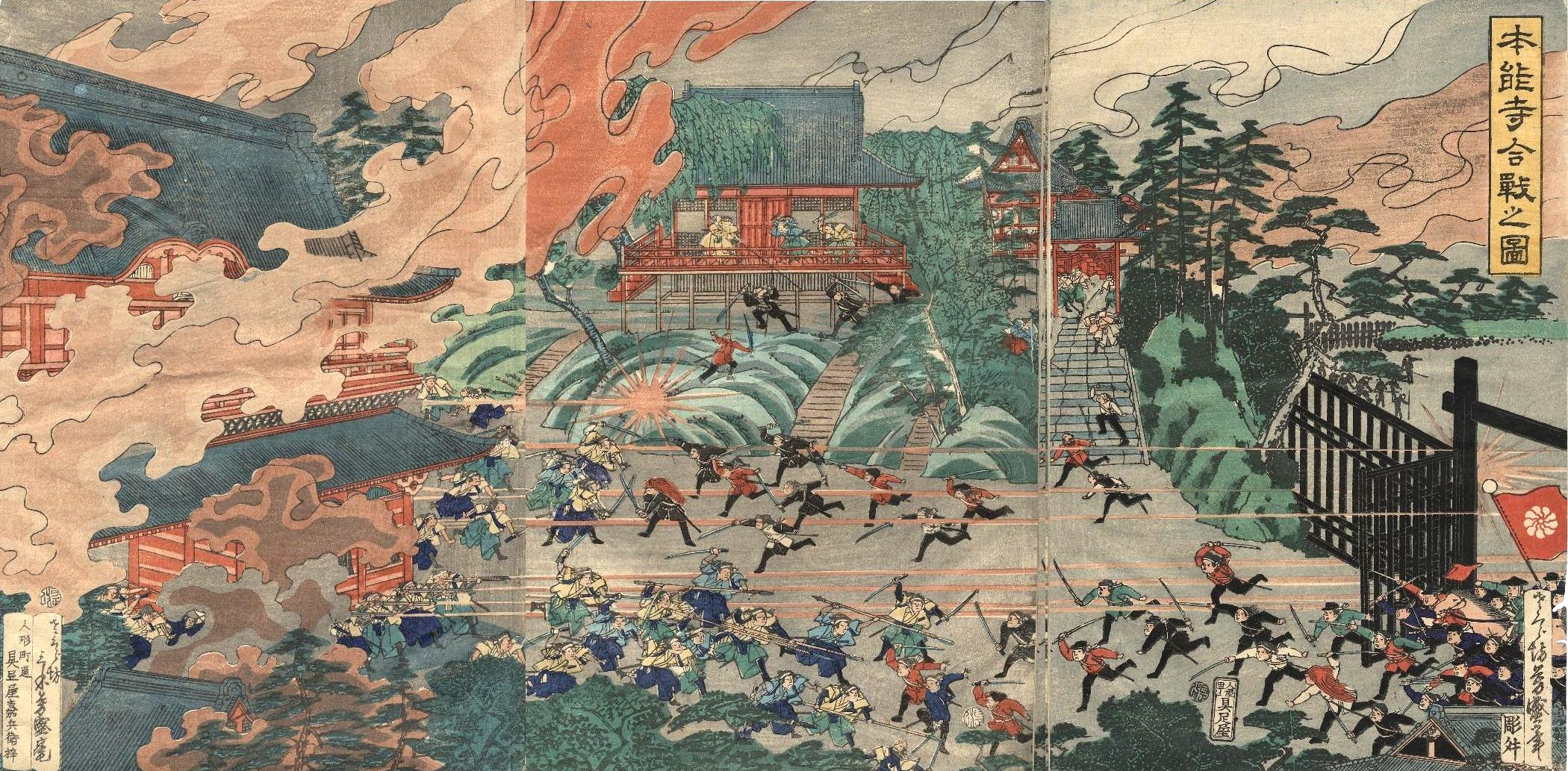
The Battle of Ueno was the final encounter leading to the Fall of Edo.

Some groups continued to resist after this formal surrender but were defeated in the Battle of Ueno in northeastern Tokyo, on 4 July 1868. The city was fully under control in July 1868. During that time, Tokugawa Yoshinobu had been under voluntary confinement at Kan'ei-ji temple.

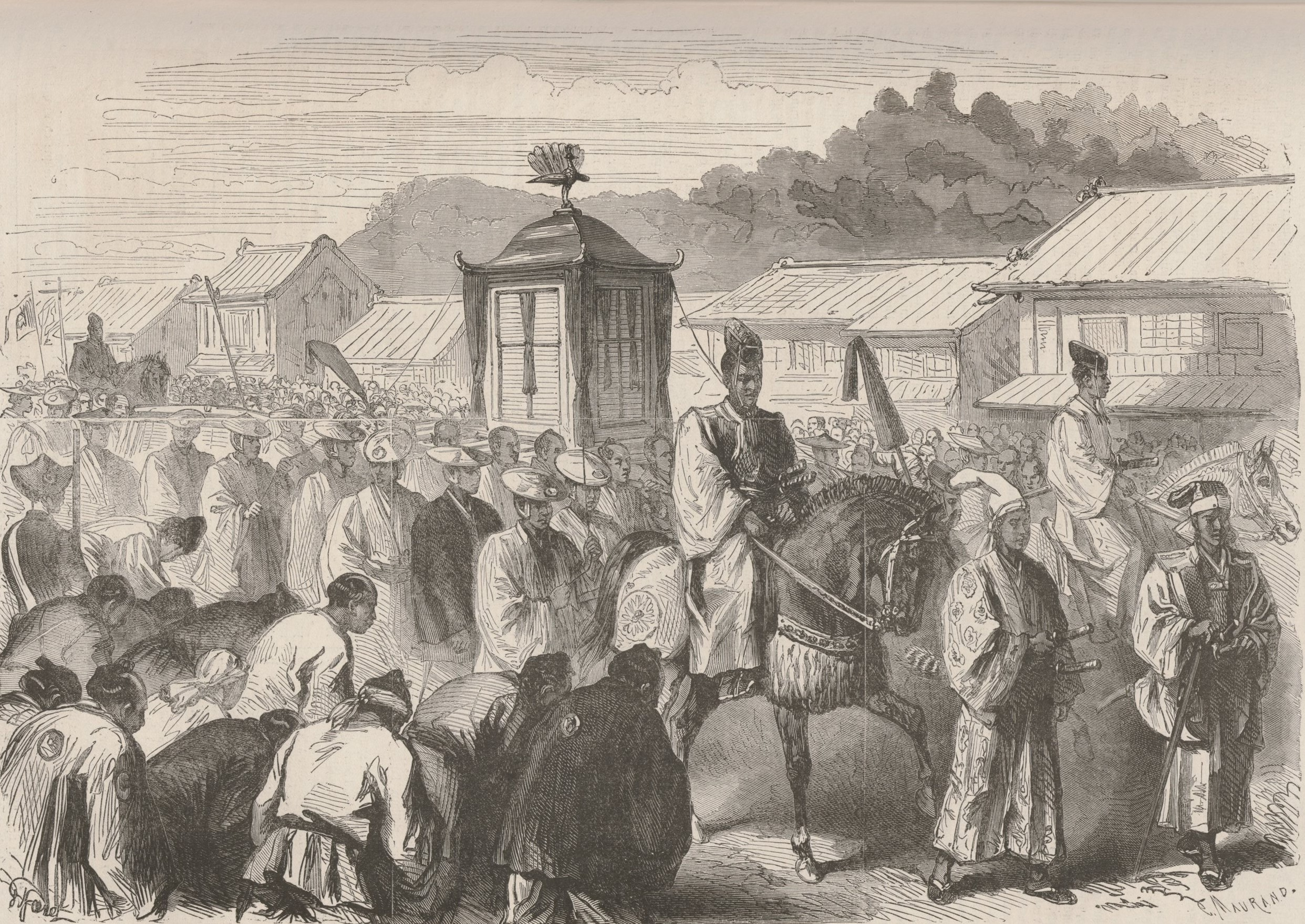
The 16-year-old Meiji Emperor, moving from Kyoto to Tokyo, end of 1868, after the Fall of Edo

On 3 September 1868, the city was renamed Tokyo ("Eastern capital"), and the Meiji Emperor moved his capital to Tokyo, electing residence in Edo Castle, today's Imperial Palace.

A small monument has been erected at the location of the surrender meeting between Saigō Takamori and Katsu Kaishū, at Minato-ku, Shiba 5–33–1.

== Cultural depictions ==
The Fall of Edo was depicted in various films and television series:

Film

- Edojō Sōzeme (1930, dir. Seika Shiba)
- Edo Saigo no Hi (1941, dir. Hiroshi Inagaki)
- Dai Tokyo Tanjō Ōedo no Kane (1958, dir. Tatsuyasu Ōsone)

Television drama

- Taiga drama
  - San Shimai (1967), 5th taiga drama
  - Katsu Kaishū (1974), 12th taiga drama
  - Tobu ga Gotoku (1990), 28th taiga drama
  - Tokugawa Yoshinobu (1998); 37th taiga drama
  - Atsuhime (2008); 47th taiga drama
  - Segodon (2018); 57th taiga drama
- Other
  - Ōoku (2003)
