= Oh! Oku =

- Film poster
- Directed by: Tōru Hayashi
- Written by: Taeko Asano
- Produced by: Kaoru Matsuzaki; Yasushi Ogawa; Noriko Koyanagi
- Starring: Yukie Nakama; Hidetoshi Nishijima; Reiko Takashima
- Cinematography: Masayuki Kawada
- Edited by: Hideyuki Ochiai
- Music by: Katsunori Ishida
- Distributed by: Fuji Television
- Release date: December 23, 2006 (Japan)
- Running time: 126 minutes
- Country: Japan
- Language: Japanese

Oh! Oku (Japanese: 大奥, Hepburn: Ōoku), also known as Oh-Oku: The Women of the Inner Palace, is a Japanese historical romantic drama film released on December 23, 2006, by Fuji Television. The film revolves around the Ejima-Ikushima affair of 1714. Director Tōru Hayashi and screenplay writer Taeko Asano also directed and wrote the 2003~2005 television series of the same name for the same company. The theme song, Unmei, was written and sung by Kumi Koda.

== Cast ==
- Yukie Nakama as Ejima
- Hidetoshi Nishijima as Ikushima Shingorō
- Haruka Igawa as Gekkō-in
- Mitsuhiro Oikawa as Manabe Akifusa
- Kaoru Sugita as Miyaji
- Shinobu Nakayama as Fujikawa
- Tae Kimura as Hōshin-in
- Yumi Asō as Kohagi
- Kaori Yamaguchi as Yoshino
- Hirotarō Honda as Arai Hakuseki
- Shōhei Hino as Doctor Okuyama
- Yuki Matsushita as Renjō-in
- Yūko Asano as Takigawa
- Reiko Takashima as Ten'ei-in
