= Tenshō-in =

Wife of Tokugawa Iesada (1836–1883)

Tenshō-in 天璋院
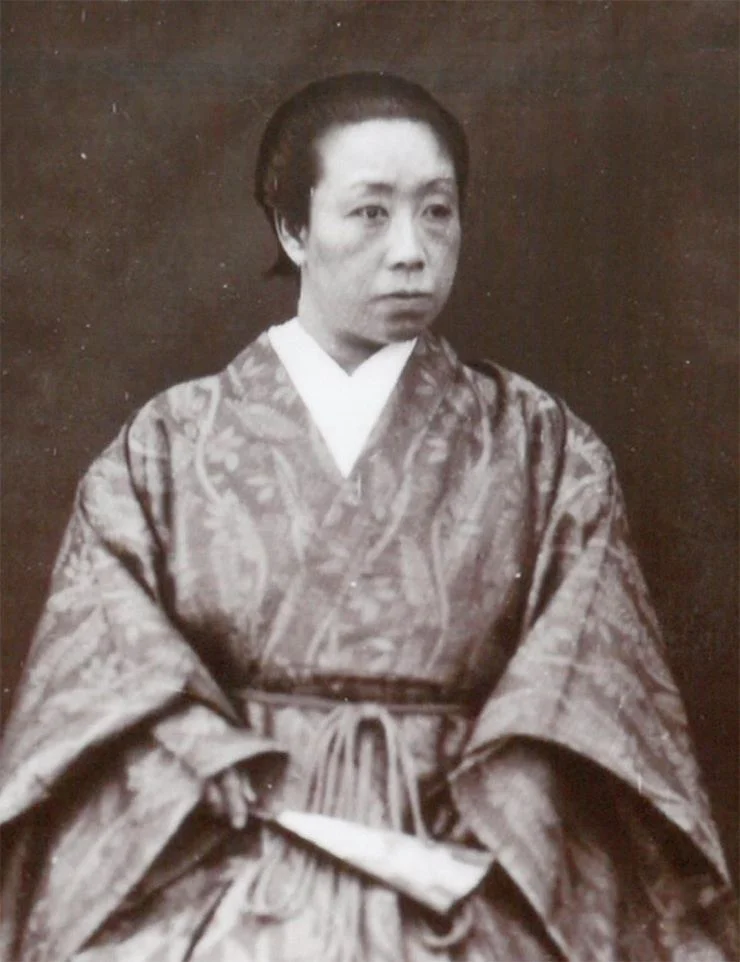

Midaidokoro
- Preceded by: Ichijo Hideko
- Succeeded by: Princess Kazu

Personal details
- Born: February 5, 1836 Kagoshima, Satsuma Domain Japan
- Died: November 20, 1883 (aged 47) Tokyo, Japan
- Spouse: Tokugawa Iesada
- Relations: Shimazu Nariakira (adoptive father); Konoe Tadahiro (adoptive father)

Tenshō-in (天璋院; February 5, 1836 – November 20, 1883), also known as Atsuko (篤子), was the official wife of Tokugawa Iesada (徳川 家定), the 13th shōgun of the Tokugawa shogunate of Japan. She was the daughter of Lady Oyuki and Shimazu Tadatake (島津忠剛), who was the head of the Imaizumi Shimazu (今和泉島津) branch of the Shimazu in Satsuma.

She was originally named Okatsu (於一) by her parents. When she was adopted by Shimazu Nariakira, her name was changed to Atsuko (篤子) or Atsu-hime (篤姫) ("Lady Atsu") and later to Fujiwara no Sumiko (藤原敬子) upon her adoption by Konoe Tadahiro.

== Biography ==
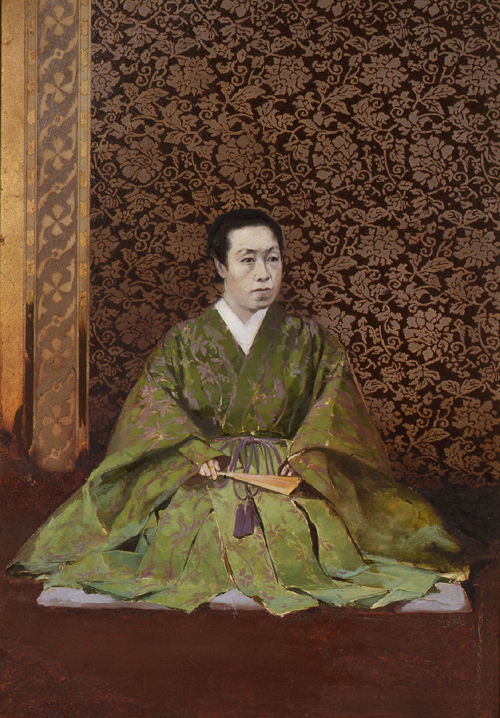
Portrait of Tensho-in by Kawamura Kiyoo

Tenshōin was born in Kagoshima in 1836. In 1853, she became the adopted daughter of Shimazu Nariakira. On August 21, 1853, she travelled by land from Kagoshima via Kokura to the Edo jurisdiction, never to return to Kagoshima again.

Atsuko was thought to have been sent to Edo Castle with the aim of helping Shimazu Nariakira politically. The question of the next heir to the shogunate was divided between the choice of Tokugawa Yoshinobu, then head of the Hitotsubashi-Tokugawa house and Tokugawa Yoshitomi, then head of Kii-Tokugawa house. In order to ensure that Yoshinobu became the next in succession, Atsuko was arranged to wed into the Tokugawa clan.

On 18 November 1856, Atsuko married Tokugawa Iesada and became a Midaidokoro. In 1858, both Tokugawa Iesada and Shimazu Nariakira died. The 14th shōgun was decided to be Iesada's cousin and adopted son, Tokugawa Iemochi. Following the demise of her husband, Atsuko took the tonsure, becoming a Buddhist nun, and took the name Tenshōin on 26 August 1858, and she was given Junior Third Rank. In 1862, as part of the Kōbu Gattai ("Union of Court and Bakufu") movement, Iemochi was married to Imperial Princess Kazu-no-Miya Chikako daughter of Emperor Ninkō, and younger sister of Emperor Kōmei. The Satsuma clan brought up the request for Tenshōin to return to Satsuma, but was rejected by Tenshōin herself. In 1866, Iemochi died. Tokugawa Yoshinobu became the next shōgun. During the Meiji Restoration, Tenshōin and her daughter in law, Seikan'in (Kazu-no-Miya's name after tonsure) helped negotiate for the peaceful surrender of Edo Castle.

She spent her remaining years nurturing Tokugawa Iesato, the 16th head of the Tokugawa clan. She moved into the Tokugawa residence in Sendagaya, in the Shibuya district, Tokyo. She suffered from Parkinson's disease which eventually took her life on November 20, 1883, at the age of 47. She was buried in Kaneiji in Ueno, Tokyo, together with her husband, Onkyoin (Iesada).

The 2008 NHK Taiga drama Atsuhime was a fifty-episode television dramatization of her life.

== Family ==
- Father: Shimazu Tadatake (1806–1854)
- Mother: Lady Oyuki
- Adoptive Fathers:
  - Shimazu Nariakira
  - Konoe Tadahiro
- Adoptive Mothers:
  - Tsunehime (1805–1858), daughter of Tokugawa Nariatsu and wife of Shimazu Nariakira
  - Shimazu Kyoko or Ikuhime (1807–1850) sister of Shimazu Nariakira and wife of Konoe Tadahiro
- Uncle: Shimazu Hisamitsu
- Husband: Tokugawa Iesada
- Adopted son: Tokugawa Iemochi

== Honours ==
- Junior Third Rank
