= Tokugawa Iesada =

Japanese Samurai, Daimyo and Military ruler of Japan from 1853 to 1858

Senior First Rank Tokugawa Iesada
- 徳川 家定
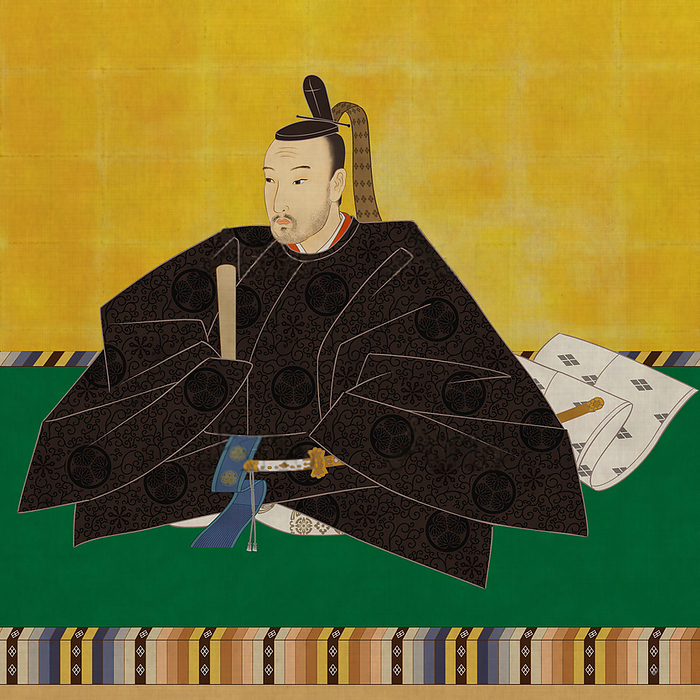

Shōgun
- In office 12 November 1853 – 14 August 1858
- Monarch: Kōmei
- Preceded by: Tokugawa Ieyoshi
- Succeeded by: Tokugawa Iemochi

Personal details
- Born: 6 May 1824 Edo, Tokugawa shogunate (now Tokyo, Japan)
- Died: 14 August 1858 (aged 34) Tokugawa shogunate
- Spouse(s): Princess Takatsukasa Atsuko; Princess Ichijō Hideko; Princess Atsu
- Parent(s): Tokugawa Ieyoshi; Honjuin
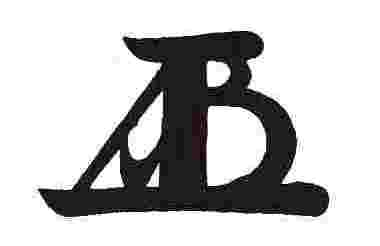
- Signature

Tokugawa Iesada (徳川 家定; 6 May 1824 – 14 August 1858) was a Japanese samurai, daimyo and the 13th shōgun of the Tokugawa shogunate of Japan. He held office for five years from 1853 to his death in 1858. He was physically weak and was therefore considered by later historians to have been unfit to be shōgun. His reign marks the beginning of the Bakumatsu period.

== Early years ==
Iesada was born in Edo Castle as Masanosuke (政之助)—the fourth son of the 12th shōgun Tokugawa Ieyoshi with his concubine, known as Honjuin. As most of Ieyoshi's children died in infancy or before coming of age, Iesada was appointed heir at a very early age, but his interaction with people was very restricted in an effort to prevent contracting any illnesses. Some historians have theorized that he may have suffered from cerebral palsy. He had suffered from smallpox in early childhood, which left his face pockmarked. On the death of Tokugawa Ienari in 1841, concerns were raised on the fitness of Iesada as heir, with Tokugawa Yoshinobu named as a potential successor. However, this was strongly opposed by the rōjū Abe Masahiro, and Iesada remained heir.

== Shōgun (1853–1858) ==
Iesada became shōgun on the sudden death of his father, Tokugawa Ieyoshi at the height of the Black Ships episode. Already in poor health, he took no active role in political affairs, leaving negotiations with the Americans in the hand of Abe Masahiro. The Convention of Kanagawa was signed on 31 March 1854. Abe resigned his post shortly afterwards, and was replaced as leader of the rōjū by Hotta Masayoshi.

Between December 1854 and November 1855, the Ansei great earthquakes and tsunamis killed up to 80,000 people. The earthquakes struck primarily in the Tōkai region but destroyed houses as far away as in Edo. The accompanying tsunamis caused damage along the entire coast from the Bōsō Peninsula in modern-day Chiba Prefecture to Tosa Province (modern-day Kōchi Prefecture). The earthquakes and tsunamis also damaged Shimoda on Izu Peninsula; and because the port had just been designated as the prospective location for a U.S. consulate, some construed the natural disasters as demonstration of the displeasure of the kami. The 1855 earthquake in Edo resulted in major fires and heavy loss of life, with a death toll of 10,000 people.

On 18 December 1856, Iesada married Princess Atsu, adopted daughter of Shimazu Nariakira and Konoe Tadahiro. She was known as Midaidokoro Atsuko (first-wife Atsuko).

On 21 October 1857, Iesada received the newly arrived American Consul Townsend Harris in an audience at Edo Castle.

Under Hotta Masayoshi's advice, Iesada ultimately signed the Harris Treaty of 1858 (the Treaty of Amity and Commerce between Japan and the United States), and subsequently other Unequal Treaties (including the Anglo-Japanese Friendship Treaty, and Anglo-Japanese Treaty of Amity and Commerce) which broke the sakoku (isolation) policy and opened Japan to foreign influences.

Kōmei, the reigning emperor at the time, was a major opponent of his policies. This strengthened the sonnō jōi movement.

Ii Naosuke was appointed tairō from 23 April 1858.

A widespread cholera outbreak from 1858 to 1860 is believed to have killed between 100,000 and 200,000 people in Edo alone.

Iesada died childless in 1858, possibly from the cholera outbreak. His grave is at the Tokugawa clan temple of Kan'ei-ji in Ueno. His buddhist name was Onkyoin.

Political factions within the bakufu clashed over the succession. Tokugawa Nariaki of Mito, Satsuma and others wanted to see Tokugawa Yoshinobu as his successor, while the Ōoku and shogunate officials including Ii Naosuke supported Tokugawa Iemochi, and succeeded. These quarrels ended in the Ansei Purge.

== Family ==
Iesada was initially married to Princess Takatsukasa Atsuko (1823–1848), the daughter of kampaku Takatsukasa Masahiro in 1842. However, she died of smallpox without having given birth to an heir. His second official wife was Princess Ichijō Hideko (1825–1850), daughter of Ichijō Tadayoshi in 1849. She died of illness less than a year later. His third marriage was to Princess Atsu (1836–1883), the adopted daughter of the daimyō of Satsuma, Shimazu Nariakira. However, none of these marriages produced any children. Before he died, he adopted his cousin as his son, Tokugawa Yoshitomi (later Tokugawa Iemochi).

- Father: Tokugawa Ieyoshi
- Mother: Honjuin (1807–1885)
- Wives:
  - Takaatsukasa Atsuko (1823–1848) later Tenryuin
  - Ichijo Hideko (1825–1850) later Sunjoin
  - Shimazu Atsuko or Konoe Sumiko, later Tenshō-in
- Concubine: Oshiga no Kata (d. 1857) later Hoken'in
- Adopted son: Tokugawa Iemochi

== Eras of Iesada's bakufu ==
The years in which Iesada was shōgun are more specifically identified by more than one era name, or nengō.

- Kaei (1848–1854)
- Ansei (1854–1860)

== Ancestry ==
Ancestors of Tokugawa Iesada

8. Tokugawa Harusada, 2nd Hitotsubashi-Tokugawa family head (1751–1827)
4. Tokugawa Ienari, 11th Tokugawa Shōgun (1773–1841)
9. Otomi no Kata (d. 1817)
2. Tokugawa Ieyoshi, 12th Tokugawa Shōgun (1793–1853)
10. Oshida Toshikatsu
5. Korin'in (d. 1810)
1. Tokugawa Iesada, 13th Tokugawa Shōgun
6. Atobe Makoto (?)
3. Honjuin (1807–1885)

== In fiction ==
Tokugawa Iesada is featured in the 2008 NHK taiga drama Atsuhime, which chronicles the life of his wife Tenshō-in. He is portrayed by Masato Sakai. Iesada's portrayal in this series (unlike most other characterizations of him as an imbecile), presents a romanticized (and largely-fictionalized) image him as a reasonable, if weak-willed individual, whose interactions with his wife Atsuhime pushed him to exert effort into his work as shōgun.

== Notes ==
Military offices
Preceded by Tokugawa Ieyoshi	Shōgun: Tokugawa Iesada; 1853–1858	Succeeded by Tokugawa Iemochi
