= Midaidokoro =

Official wife of the Japanese shōgun

The midaidokoro (御台所) was the official wife of the shōgun. During the Edo period, she resided in the Ōoku of Edo Castle and sometimes wielded considerable political power behind the scenes.

== Heian period ==
- Miyoshi Takako, wife of Sakanoue no Tamuramaro and daughter of Miyoshi Kiyotsugu

== Kamakura period ==
- Hōjō Masako, daughter of Hōjō Tokimasa, wife of Minamoto no Yoritomo and mother of Minamoto no Yoriie and Minamoto no Sanetomo
- Wakasa no Tsubone (d.1203), daughter of Hiki Yoshikazu and wife of Minamoto no Yoriie also mother of Take no Gosho (wife of Kujo Yoritsune)
- Bomon Nobuko (1193-1274), daughter of Bomon Nobukiyo and wife of Minamoto no Sanetomo
- Minamoto no Yoshiko or Take no Gosho (1202–1234), daughter of second shōgun Minamoto no Yoriie with Wakasa no Tsubone and wife of Kujo Yoritsune
- Hiwadahime (1230–1247), daughter of Hojo Tokiuji and wife of Kujo Yoritsugu
- Konoe Saiko (b. 1241), daughter of Konoe Kanetsune, wife of Prince Munetaka and mother of Prince Koreyasu
- daughter of Prince Koreyasu, wife of Prince Hisaaki and mother of Prince Morikuni died in 1306.

== Nanbokucho period ==
- daughter of Kitabatake Moronaga and wife of Prince Moriyoshi

== Muromachi period ==
- Akahashi Toshi (1306–1365), wife of Ashikaga Takauji and mother of Ashikaga Yoshiakira
- Shibukawa Koshi (1332–1392), daughter of Shibukawa Yoshisue and wife of Ashikaga Yoshiakira
- Hino Nariko (1351–1405), wife of Ashikaga Yoshimitsu and daughter of Hino Tokimitsu
- Hino Eiko (1390–1431), wife of Ashikaga Yoshimochi, daughter of Hino Motoyasu and mother of Ashikaga Yoshikazu
- Hino Muneko (d. 1447), wife of Ashikaga Yoshinori and daughter of Hino Shigemitsu
- Hino Tomiko, wife of Ashikaga Yoshimasa, daughter of Hino Shigemasa and mother of Ashikaga Yoshihisa
- Shōun'in, wife of Ashikaga Yoshihisa and daughter of Hino Katsumitsu
- Seiyun'in, daughter of Hosokawa Shigeyuki and wife of Ashikaga Yoshitane
- Hino Akiko, daughter of Hino Nagatoshi, wife of Ashikaga Yoshizumi and mother of Ashikaga Yoshiharu
- Keijuin (1514–1565), daughter of Konoe Hisamichi, wife of Ashikaga Yoshiharu and mother of Ashikaga Yoshiteru and Ashikaga Yoshiaki
- daughter of Konoe Taneie and wife of Ashikaga Yoshiteru
- Yuki no Tsubone, wife of Ashikaga Yoshihide

== Edo period ==
- Oeyo, daughter of Azai Nagamasa, wife of Tokugawa Hidetada and mother of Tokugawa Iemitsu
- Takatsukasa Takako (1622–1683) later Honriin, wife of Tokugawa Iemitsu and daughter of Takatsukasa Nobufusa
- Asa no Miya Akiko (1640–1676) later Koke'in, wife of Tokugawa Ietsuna and daughter of Fushimi no Miya Sadakiyo
- Takatsukasa Nobuko (1651–1709) later Tenjoin, wife of Tokugawa Tsunayoshi and daughter of Takatsukasa Norihira
- Konoe Hiroko (1666–1741) later Ten-ei'in, wife of Tokugawa Ienobu and daughter of Konoe Motohiro
- Yasonomiya Yoshiko Naishinno later Jorin'in-no-Miya (1714-1758), wife of Tokugawa Ietsugu and daughter of Emperor Reigen
- Iso no Miya Tomoko later Haisen'in (1738–1771), wife of Tokugawa Ieharu and daughter of Kan'in no Miya Naohito Shinno
- Shimazu no Shigehime or Tadakohime (1773–1844) later Kodai-in, wife of Tokugawa Ienari and daughter of Shimazu Shigehide of Satsuma Domain
- Arisugawa Takako (1795–1840) later Jokan-in, wife of Tokugawa Ieyoshi and daughter of Prince Arisugawa Orihito
- Shimazu Atsuhime or Fujiwara no Sumiko, later Tenshoin, wife of Tokugawa Iesada and daughter of Shimazu Tadatake (1806-1854), adopted daughter of Shimazu Nariakira and Konoe Tadahiro
- Chikako, Princess Kazu, later Seikan'in-no-miya, wife of Tokugawa Iemochi and daughter of Emperor Ninkō

The first Midaidokoro in this period was wife of the second shōgun, Tokugawa Hidetada, because when the Tokugawa Ieyasu became shōgun, his wives had already died and there was no Midaidokoro at that time. When Tokugawa Yoshimune's time came he didn't have Midaidokoro either because his wife had died before he became shōgun. Also when Tokugawa Ieshige's time, his wife already died. At Tokugawa Yoshinobu's time, he and his wife, Ichijō Mikako, did not live together as she did not move into Edo Castle. Thus, her title was officially defined as Gorenju.

== See also ==
- Ōmidaidokoro
- Mandokoro
- seishitsu
