= Seishitsu =

Japanese historical term

Seishitsu (正室) is the Japanese term of the Edo period for the official wife of high-ranking persons. The tennō, kugyō (court officials), shōgun and daimyōs often had several wives to ensure the birth of an heir. The seishitsu had a status above other wives, called sokushitsu (側室, concubine).

The system dates back to the ritsuryō system in the Nara and Heian periods. At the time, the main wife was called chakusai (嫡妻). The last Japanese emperor to have official concubines was Emperor Meiji.

Succession disputes between sons of the official wife and concubines were a constant source of internal, often armed conflict within houses (O-Ie Sōdō).

== See also ==
- midaidokoro
- Dishu system
