= Regnal name =

Name chosen by a reigning monarch, different from their original secular name

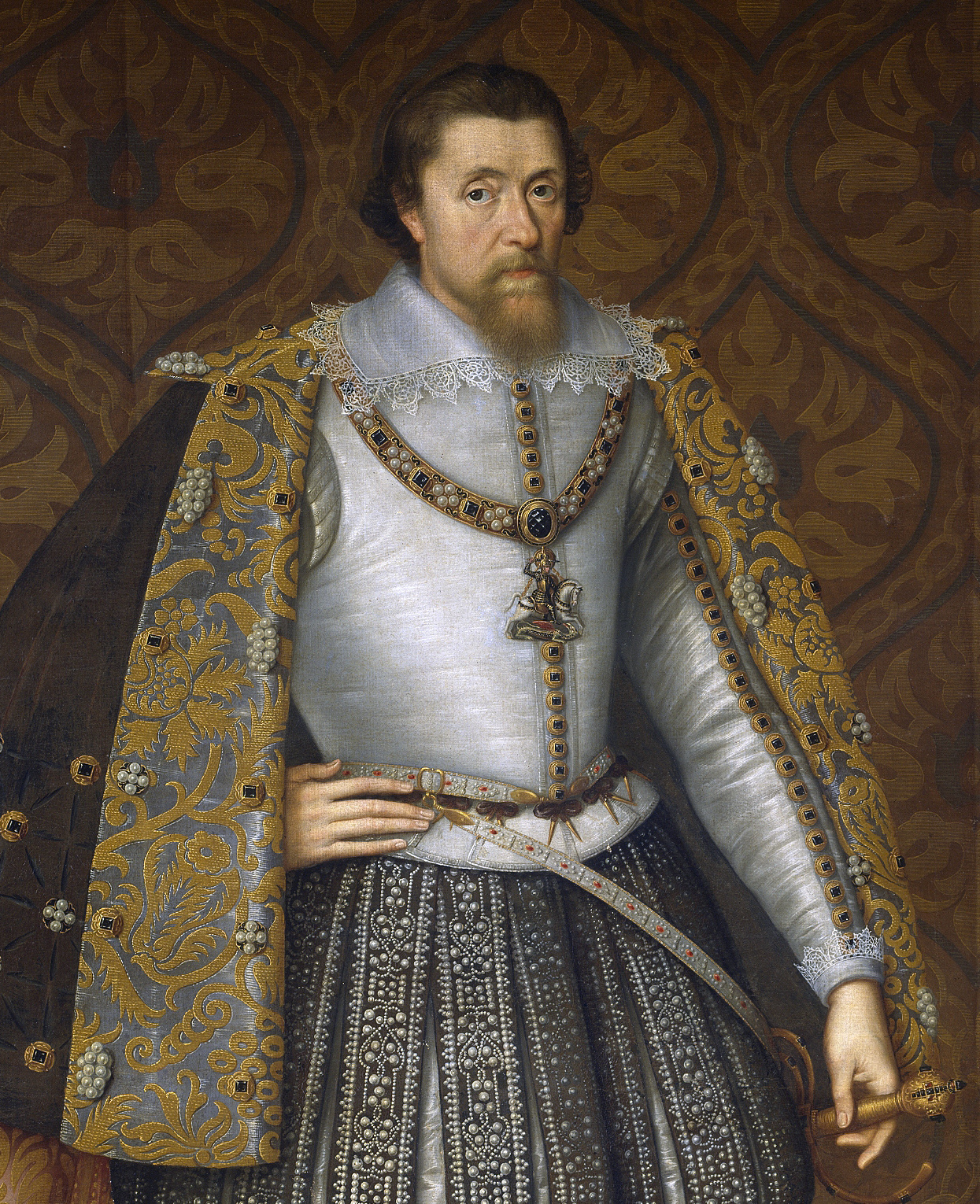
James VI and I

A regnal name, regnant name, or reign name is the name used by monarchs and popes during their reigns and subsequently, historically. Since ancient times, some monarchs have chosen to use a different name from their original name when they accede to the monarchy.

The regnal name is usually followed by a regnal number, written as a Roman numeral, to differentiate that monarch from others who have used the same name while ruling the same realm. In some cases, the monarch has more than one regnal name, but the regnal number is based on only one of those names, for example Charles X Gustav of Sweden. If a monarch reigns in more than one realm, they may carry different ordinals in each one, as some realms may have had different numbers of rulers of the same regnal name. For example, the same person was both King James VI of Scotland and King James I of England.

The ordinal is not normally used for the first ruler of the name, but is used in historical references once the name is used again. Thus, Queen Elizabeth I of England was called simply "Elizabeth of England" until the accession of Queen Elizabeth II almost four centuries later in 1952; subsequent historical references to the earlier queen retroactively refer to her as Elizabeth I. However, Tsar Paul I of Russia, King Umberto I of Italy, Emperor Franz Joseph I of Austria, King Juan Carlos I of Spain and Emperor Haile Selassie I of Ethiopia and Louis Phillipe I of France all used the ordinal I (first) during their reigns, even if there was – at least so far in the case of Paul of Russia, Franz Joseph of Austria, Juan Carlos of Spain or Haile Selassie of Ethiopia, and Louis Philippe of France – never a second ruler with the same name. In spoken English, such names are pronounced as "Elizabeth the First", "George the Sixth", etc.

In some countries in Asia, monarchs took or take era names. While era names as such are not used in many monarchies, sometimes eras are named after a monarch (usually long-lived), or a succession of monarchs of the same name. This is customary; there is no formal or general rule. For example, the whole period during which a succession of four Georges (George I, II, III, and IV) of the Hanoverian dynasty reigned in Great Britain became known as the Georgian era. Conversely, although there were many Edwards, the Edwardian era always refers to the reign of Edward VII at the beginning of the 20th century.

== Monarchies ==
=== Ancient rulers ===
Ancient rulers in many parts of the world took regnal names or throne names which were different from their personal name. This is known to be true, for instance, of several kings of Assyria, and appears to be the case for several kings of Judah. In Ancient Egypt, Pharaohs took a number of names—the praenomen being the most commonly used, on occasion in conjunction with their personal name.

=== Africa ===
==== Ethiopia ====
In the Ethiopian Empire, especially during the Solomonic dynasty, many Emperors would take a throne name, though this was not a general practice; a great number of rulers would remain known during their reign by their birth names. Yekuno Amlak, the founder of the Solomonic dynasty, took his father's name, Tasfa Iyasus, as his throne name. Yagbe'u Seyon, his son and heir, took the throne name Salomon after the biblical figure. Amda Seyon took the throne name Gebre Mesqel, "slave of the cross"; Tewodros I was Walda Ambasa, "son of the lion"; Sarwe Iyasus was Mehreka Nañ "distributor of your [the Lord's] mercy"; etc. Tafari Makonnen, the last sovereign Emperor of Ethiopia, took as his throne name Haile Selassie, meaning "Power of the Trinity".

==== Nigeria ====
In the various extant traditional states of Nigeria, the regnal names of the titled monarchs, who are known locally as the traditional rulers, serve two very important functions within the monarchical system. Firstly, because in most states all of the legitimate descendants of the first man or woman to arrive at the site of any given community are considered its dynastic heirs, their thrones are usually rotated amongst almost endless pools of contending cousins who all share the names of the founders of their houses as primary surnames. To differentiate them, secondary surnames are also used for the septs of each of the royal families that are eligible for the aforementioned rotations, names that often come from the names of state of the first members of their immediate lineages to rule in their lands. Whenever any of their direct heirs ascend the thrones, they often use their septs' names as reign names as well, using the appropriate ordinals to differentiate themselves from the founders of the said septs. An example of this is found in the kingdom of Lagos, where the Adeniji-Adele family is distinguished from their numerous Adele cousins by the word Adeniji, which was actually the first name of the reigning founder of their branch of the dynasty, the Oba Adeniji Adele II. This distinction notwithstanding, both groups of dynasts (as well as a number of other ones that do not have the name Adele as an official surname, such as that of the Oloye Adekunle Ojora, a prominent nobleman of royal descent) are part of what is known as the Adele Ajosun Ruling House of Lagos.

Regnal names also serve in Nigeria and in much of Africa as chronological markers in much the same way that those of Europe do (e.g. the Victorian era). When a person describes what happened when so and so ruled over any particular place or people, what he or she is actually saying is that an event happened within a finite period of time, one that is equal to the duration of the reign of the monarch in question. Because it is possible (and in fact common, particularly among the southern tribes) for one individual to have several different names and aliases in a single life, a certain degree of uniformity in usage is required if the history of an entire state is to be tied to his or her name. It is for this reason that when new monarchs are enthroned, the uniqueness of their names is usually considered to be a matter of considerable importance (even when it is caused by nothing more than the adding of ordinals to them or the allowing of more than a generation to pass before their subsequent usage). An example of this can be found in the kingdom of Benin, where the throne name of Erediauwa I became the surname of all of his immediate family in the Eweka royal house of the state, thus nominally tying them and their descendants to the era of his reign. This is especially obvious when their branch's name is compared to the last names of the said king's brothers and their heirs, named the Akenzuas after his father Akenzua II, and his uncles and their heirs, named the Ewekas after his grandfather Eweka II.

A few Nigerian monarchs, such as Obi Nnaemeka Achebe of Onitsha, do not make use of official regnal names and instead maintain their pre-coronation names during their reigns.

=== Asia ===
==== Sinosphere ====
Monarchies of the Chinese cultural sphere practiced naming taboo, wherein the personal names of the rulers were to be avoided.

Monarchs could adopt or be honored with a honorific name (尊號; zūn hào) during their reign or after they had abdicated; they were the most similar to the concept of regnal names.

Since the Shang dynasty, Chinese sovereigns could be honored with temple names (廟號; miào hào) after their death, for the purpose of ancestor worship. Temple names consisted of two or three Chinese characters, with the last word being either zǔ (祖; "progenitor") or zōng (宗; "ancestor"). Since the Zhou dynasty, Chinese monarchs were frequently accorded posthumous names (謚號; shì hào) after their death. Posthumous names were adjectives originally intended to determine the achievements and moral values, or the lack thereof, of one's life. Since both titles were accorded only after one's death, they were not effectively regnal names. As a result of Chinese cultural and political influence, temple names and posthumous names were adopted by monarchs of Korea and Vietnam, whereas monarchs of Japan adopted only posthumous names.

Since 140 BC, during the reign of the Emperor Wu of Han, Chinese sovereigns often proclaimed era names (年號; nián hào) for the purpose of identifying and numbering years. Prior to the Ming dynasty, it was common for Chinese monarchs to proclaim more than one era name during a single reign, or that a single era name could span the reigns of several rulers. Monarchs of the Ming and Qing dynasties, however, often adopted only one era name throughout their reign. Thus, Chinese sovereigns of the Ming and Qing dynasties came to be highly associated with the corresponding era name of their reign and are commonly known by their respective era name with few exceptions, although era names were not effectively regnal names. The era name system was also adopted by rulers of Korea, Vietnam and Japan, with Japan still using the system to this day.

The following table provides examples from China, Japan, Korea and Vietnam to illustrate the differences between monarchical titles in the Sinosphere. Bold characters represent the most common way to refer to the monarchs.

Realm	Dynasty	Personal name	Honorific name	Era name	Temple name	Posthumous name
China	Eastern Han dynasty	Liu Da 劉炟	None	Jianchu 建初 Yuanhe 元和 Zhanghe 章和	Suzong 肅宗	Emperor Xiaozhang 孝章皇帝
China	Tang dynasty	Li Longji 李隆基	Emperor Kaiyuan Shengwen Shenwu 開元聖文神武皇帝	Xiantian 先天 Kaiyuan 開元 Tianbao 天寶	Xuanzong 玄宗	Emperor Zhidao Dasheng Daming Xiao 至道大聖大明孝皇帝
China	Liao dynasty	Yelü Deguang 耶律德光	Emperor Sisheng 嗣聖皇帝	Tianxian 天顯 Huitong 會同 Datong 大同	Taizong 太宗	Emperor Xiaowu Huiwen 孝武惠文皇帝
China	Northern Han dynasty	Liu Jiyuan 劉繼元	Emperor Yingwu 英武皇帝	Tianhui 天會 Guangyun 廣運	None	None
China	Qing dynasty	Xuanye 玄燁	None	Kangxi 康熙	Shengzu 聖祖	Emperor Hetian Hongyun Wenwu Ruizhe Gongjian Kuanyu Xiaojing Chengxin Zhonghe Gongde Dacheng Ren 合天弘運文武睿哲恭儉寬裕孝敬誠信中和功德大成仁皇帝
Japan	Imperial dynasty	Obito 首	None	Jinki 神亀 Tenpyō 天平 Tenpyō-kanpō 天平感宝	None	Emperor Shōmu 聖武天皇
Japan	Imperial dynasty	Osahito 統仁	None	Kaei 嘉永 Ansei 安政 Man'en 万延 Bunkyū 文久 Genji 元治 Keiō 慶応	None	Emperor Kōmei 孝明天皇
Korea	Goryeo	Wang Un 王運 왕운	None	None (Note: As Goryeo was a tributary state of the Khitan-led Chinese Liao dynasty, the former did not have independent era names of its own. Instead, Goryeo officially used the era names of the Liao dynasty.)	Seonjong 宣宗 선종	King Gwanin Hyeonsun Anseong Sahyo 寬仁顯順安成思孝大王 관인현순안성사효대왕
Korea	Joseon	Yi Yu 李瑈 이유	Seungcheon Chedo Yeolmun Yeongmu 承天體道烈文英武 승천체도열문영무	None (Note: As Joseon was a tributary state of the Chinese Ming dynasty, the former did not have independent era names of its own. Instead, Joseon officially used the era names of the Ming dynasty.)	Sejo 世祖 세조	King Hyejang Sungcheon Chedo Yeolmun Yeongmu Jideok Yunggong Seongsin Myeongye Heumsuk Inhyo 惠莊承天體道烈文英武至德隆功聖神明睿欽肅仁孝大王 혜장승천체도열문영무지덕융공성신명예흠숙인효대왕
Vietnam	Revival Lê dynasty	Lê Duy Kỳ 黎維祺; Lê Duy Kỳ	None	Vĩnh Tộ 永祚; Vĩnh Tộ Đức Long 德隆; Đức Long Dương Hòa 陽和; Dương Hòa Khánh Đức 慶德; Khánh Đức Thịnh Đức 盛德; Thịnh Đức Vĩnh Thọ 永壽; Vĩnh Thọ Vạn Khánh 萬慶; Vạn Khánh	Thần Tông 神宗; Thần Tông	Emperor Uyên 淵皇帝; Uyên Hoàng đế
Vietnam	Nguyễn dynasty	Nguyễn Phúc Tuyền 阮福暶; Nguyễn Phúc Tuyền	None	Thiệu Trị 紹治; Thiệu Trị	Hiến Tổ 憲祖; Hiến Tổ	Emperor Thiệu thiên Long vận Chí thiện Thuần hiếu Khoan minh Duệ đoán Văn trị Vũ công Thánh triết Chương 紹天隆運至善純孝寬明睿斷文治武功聖哲章皇帝; Thiệu thiên Long vận Chí thiện Thuần hiếu Khoan minh Duệ đoán Văn trị Vũ công Thánh triết Chương Hoàng đế

==== Southeast Asia ====
- Rama (Kings of Thailand)
- List of kings of Cambodia

=== Europe ===
==== Hungary ====
During the Middle Ages, when the House of Árpád disappeared in 1301, two of the monarchs who claimed the throne and were crowned chose a different name. Otto III, Duke of Bavaria became Bela V of Hungary, taking the name of his maternal grandfather, Béla IV of Hungary. On the other hand, Wenceslaus III of Bohemia signed his royal documents in Hungary as Ladislas, this being a very traditional name in the Kingdom.

Later during the first half of the 14th century, Charles I of Hungary signed as "Carolus rex", but in fact his birth name was the Italian Caroberto. This is why he is often referred to by Hungarian historians as "Charles Robert of Hungary".

==== Netherlands ====
All ruling male members of the House of Orange-Nassau bore the name Willem (William). The current king of the Netherlands was christened Willem-Alexander. During an interview in 1997 he said he intended to rule under the name of Willem IV, but he had a change of mind. In a televised interview just before his inauguration, he announced he would continue to use the name Willem-Alexander, saying "I spent 46 years of my life under the name Willem-Alexander, and specifically under the nickname of Alexander. I think it would be weird to discard that because I become king of the country." Furthermore, he said he did not consider himself "a mere number", adding that regnal numbers reminded him of Dutch cattle naming conventions.

==== Poland ====
When the House of Piast disappeared and the Lithuanian House of Jagiellon was elected in the figure of the High Duke Jogaila, this monarch took the name of Władysław II, in honour of the previous Polish king (Władysław I the Elbow-high) with this traditional name. Similarly, when the Elector of Saxony, Frederick Augustus I, was elected king in 1697, he took the name of Augustus II. His son Frederick Augustus II crowned in 1734, also took the name of Augustus, becoming Augustus III.

==== Portugal ====
The monarchs of Portugal have traditionally used their first baptismal name as their regnal name upon their accession. The only notable exception was Sancho I, who was born Martin of Burgundy (Martinho de Borgonha, in Portuguese). As he was a younger son, Martin was expected to join the clergy, and was named after Saint Martin of Tours, on whose feast day he had been born. When the heir apparent, Henry, died, the prince's name was changed to Sancho, one with a more established royal tradition in the other Iberian monarchies (Navarre, Castile and Aragon).

==== United Kingdom ====
Though most monarchs of the United Kingdom have used their first baptismal name as their regnal name, on three occasions monarchs have chosen a different name.

First, Queen Victoria had been christened Alexandrina Victoria, but took the throne under the name Victoria.

When Victoria's son, Prince Albert Edward, became king in 1901, he took the regnal name Edward VII, against the wish of his late mother. The new king declared that he chose the name Edward as an honoured name borne by six of his English predecessors, and that he preferred that the name Albert be only associated in royal history with his father.

In 1936, after the abdication crisis, Prince Albert, Duke of York, assumed the throne. His full name was Albert Frederick Arthur George, but he became King George VI rather than "King Albert" in order to emphasise continuity with his father and restore confidence in the monarchy.

==== Scotland ====
When John, Earl of Carrick ascended the throne in 1390, it was deemed imprudent for him to take the regnal name of "John II", due to the turbulent reigns of recent kings named John (John Balliol, John of England, and John II of France). Furthermore, royal propaganda of the time held that John Balliol had not been a legitimate king of Scots, making the new king's regnal number also a difficult issue. To avoid these problems, John took the regnal name of Robert III, honouring his father and great-grandfather.

Upon the 1952 accession of Elizabeth II, the title Elizabeth II caused controversy in Scotland as there had never been a Scottish Elizabeth I. Winston Churchill suggested that British sovereigns would use either the Scottish or the English number, whichever was higher; this convention fit the pattern of prior reigns since the Acts of Union 1707, all subsequent monarchs either having higher regnal numbers in England (namely William IV, Edward VII, and Edward VIII) or had names not used before the Union (George and Victoria). New Royal Mail post boxes in Scotland bearing the cypher EIIR, were vandalised, after which, to avoid further problems, post boxes and Royal Mail vehicles in Scotland bore only the Crown of Scotland. A legal case, MacCormick v. Lord Advocate (1953 SC 396), contested the right of the Queen to title herself Elizabeth II in Scotland, arguing that to do so would be a breach of the Act of Union. The case, however, was dismissed on the grounds that the pursuers had no title to sue the Crown, and also that the numbering of monarchs was part of the royal prerogative, and thus not governed by the Act of Union.

==== Roman Empire ====
The Roman Emperors usually had the titles of "Imperator Caesar Augustus" in their names (which made these regnal names). Caesar came from the cognomen of Gaius Julius Caesar, Imperator meant Commander and Augustus meant venerable or majestic. The name usually went in two ways, Imperator (Praenomen, Nomen and Cognomen) Caesar Augustus or Imperator Caesar (Praenomen, Nomen and Cognomen) Augustus. Also, Imperator became a Praenomen of Roman Emperors, Augustus and Caesar became a cognomen of theirs.

== Religious offices ==
=== Catholic Church ===
Immediately after a new pope is elected, and accepts the election, he is asked by the Dean of the College of Cardinals, "By what name shall you be called?" The new pope chooses the name by which he will be known. The senior Cardinal Deacon, or Cardinal Protodeacon, then appears on the balcony of Saint Peter's Basilica to proclaim the new Pope, informing the world of the man elected Pope, and under which name he would be known during his reign.

Annuntio vobis gaudium magnum:
Habemus Papam!
Eminentissimum ac Reverendissimum Dominum,
Dominum [forename],
Sanctæ Romanæ Ecclesiæ Cardinalem [surname],
qui sibi nomen imposuit [papal name].

I announce to you a great joy:
We have a Pope!
The Most Eminent and Most Reverend Lord,
Lord [forename],
Cardinal of the Holy Roman Church [surname],
who conferred upon himself the name [papal name].

During the first centuries of the church, priests elected bishop of Rome continued to use their baptismal names after their elections. The custom of choosing a new name began in AD 533 with the election of Mercurius. Mercurius had been named after the Roman god Mercury, and decided that it would not be appropriate for a pope to be named after a pagan deity. Mercurius subsequently decreed that he would be known as John II. Since the end of the tenth century the pope has customarily chosen a new name for himself during his Pontificate; however, until the 16th century some pontiffs used their baptismal names.

The last pope to use his baptismal name was Pope Marcellus II in 1555, a choice that was even then quite exceptional. The names chosen by popes are not based on any system other than general honorifics. They have been based on immediate predecessors, mentors, political similarity, or even after family members—as was the case with Pope John XXIII. The practice of using the baptismal name as papal name has not been ruled out and future popes could elect to continue using their original names after being elected pope.

Often the new pontiff's choice of name upon being elected to the papacy is seen as a signal to the world of whom the new pope will emulate or what policies he will seek to enact. Such is the case with Benedict XVI who, in fact, explained the reasons for his choice of name during his first General Audience in St. Peter's Square, on 27 April 2005. On that occasion, he said that he wanted to remember "Pope Benedict XV, that courageous prophet of peace, who guided the Church through turbulent times of war", and also "Saint Benedict of Nursia, co-patron of Europe, whose life evokes the Christian roots of Europe".

There has never been a Pope Peter II. Even though there is no specific prohibition against choosing the name Peter, bishops elected to the Papacy have refrained from doing so even if their own given name was Peter. This is because of a tradition that only Saint Peter should have that honor. In the 10th century John XIV used the regnal name John because his given name was Peter. While some antipopes did take the name Peter II, their claims are not recognized by the mainstream Roman Catholic Church, and each of these men only either has or had a minuscule following that recognized their claims.

Probably because of the controversial Antipope John XXIII, new popes avoided taking the regnal name John for over 600 years until the election of Angelo Cardinal Roncalli in 1958. Immediately after his election, there was some confusion as to whether he would be known as John XXIII or John XXIV. Cardinal Roncalli thus moved to immediately resolve by declaring that he would be known as John XXIII.

In 1978, Albino Luciani became the first pope to use two names for his regnal name when he took the name John Paul I, including the "I". He took the "John Paul" name to honor both John XXIII and Paul VI. With the unexpected death of John Paul I a little over a month later, Karol Wojtyła took the name John Paul II to honor his immediate predecessor.

Antipopes also have regnal names, and also use the ordinal to show their position in the line of previous pontiffs with their names. For example, David Bawden took the name Michael I when declared pope in 1990.

=== Coptic Church ===
Coptic popes also choose regnal names distinct from their given names.

=== Islamic caliphates ===
The use of regnal names (laqab) was uncommon in the Medieval Islamic era until the Abbasid Caliphate, when the first Abbasid caliph, Abu al-Abbas Abdullah ibn Muhammad, who overthrew the Umayyad dynasty, used the laqab as-Saffah ("the Blood-Shedder"). This name carried a messianic association, a theme that would be continued by as-Saffah's successors. The use of regnal names among the caliphs lasted throughout the reign of the Abbasid Caliphate, until the institution was deposed after the defeat of the Mamluk Sultanate and the capture of Caliph al-Mutawakkil III by the Ottoman Army in 1517.

The Fatimid caliphs adopted the Abbasid use of the laqab to assert their claims of authority.

== See also ==
- Chinese era name
- Japanese era name
- Korean era name
- Vietnamese era name
- Temple name
- Posthumous name
- Rama (Kings of Thailand)
- Religious name
