= Isra Chaker =

Syrian American entrepreneur and human rights advocate

- Occupations: Human rights advocate, Nonprofit executive
- Title: Founder and CEO of Every Pregnancy
- Website: https://www.israchaker.com/

Isra Chaker is a Syrian American entrepreneur and human rights advocate. She is the CEO of Every Pregnancy, a coalition of faith-inspired organizations working on maternal health and newborn. She has worked as a campaign strategist and advocate for refugees and immigrants for organizations including Syria Relief and Development, Oxfam America, the American Civil Liberties Union (ACLU), and Amnesty International USA.

== Early life and career ==
Chaker grew up in Boulder, Colorado in a Syrian-American Muslim family. She began her career as an Advocacy and Outreach Coordinator at Syria Relief and Development, and later worked as a lead advocate at the United Nations consulting on Syria Strategy. She subsequently served as Senior Refugee, Migration and Protection Campaign Lead at Oxfam America. At the American Civil Liberties Union (ACLU), she worked as a campaign strategist, where she led national campaigns on immigrants' rights, racial justice, and issues affecting Arab, Middle Eastern, Muslim and South Asian (AMEMSA) communities. She has also been identified as a Senior Campaign Manager at Amnesty International USA.

In 2017, while working with Oxfam America, Chaker was one of the organizer of an event in which refugees from Syria, Somalia, and Vietnam were invited to the childhood home of then-President Donald Trump in Queens, New York. The participants shared their experiences of displacement and resettlement in the United States. In 2019, she developed a lesson plan for Oxfam America's Amplifier program that explored the experiences of the refugees, the U.S. travel ban, and advocacy through art and other interactive activities.

Chaker has served as an Ambassador for One Young World and spoken at its summits in London in 2019, and Manchester in 2022. She was also a public advocate for UNRWA USA.

== Every Pregnancy and Born Into ==
Chaker is the founder and chief executive officer of Every Pregnancy, formerly known as "For Mama". It is a maternal health initiative that works with Muslim philanthropic organizations to support maternal and newborn health.

Isra chaker also hosts Born Into, a podcast produced in connection with Every Pregnancy, on which she has interviewed guests including Toyin Saraki, founder of the Wellbeing Foundation Africa.

== Awards and recognition ==
In 2018, Isra was selected in Amplifier's "We The Future" art and advocacy campaign as a representative of its refugee and immigration justice theme.

In 2023, she was named as one of the Middle East Policy Council's "40 Under 40 list".
