= Komei =

Komei can refer to:

1. Emperor Kōmei, 121st imperial ruler of Japan.
2. New Komeito Party, a Japanese political party.
