= Tokugawa Iemochi =

Japanese samurai, daimyo and Military ruler of Japan from 1858 to 1866

Senior First Rank Tokugawa Iemochi
- 徳川 家茂
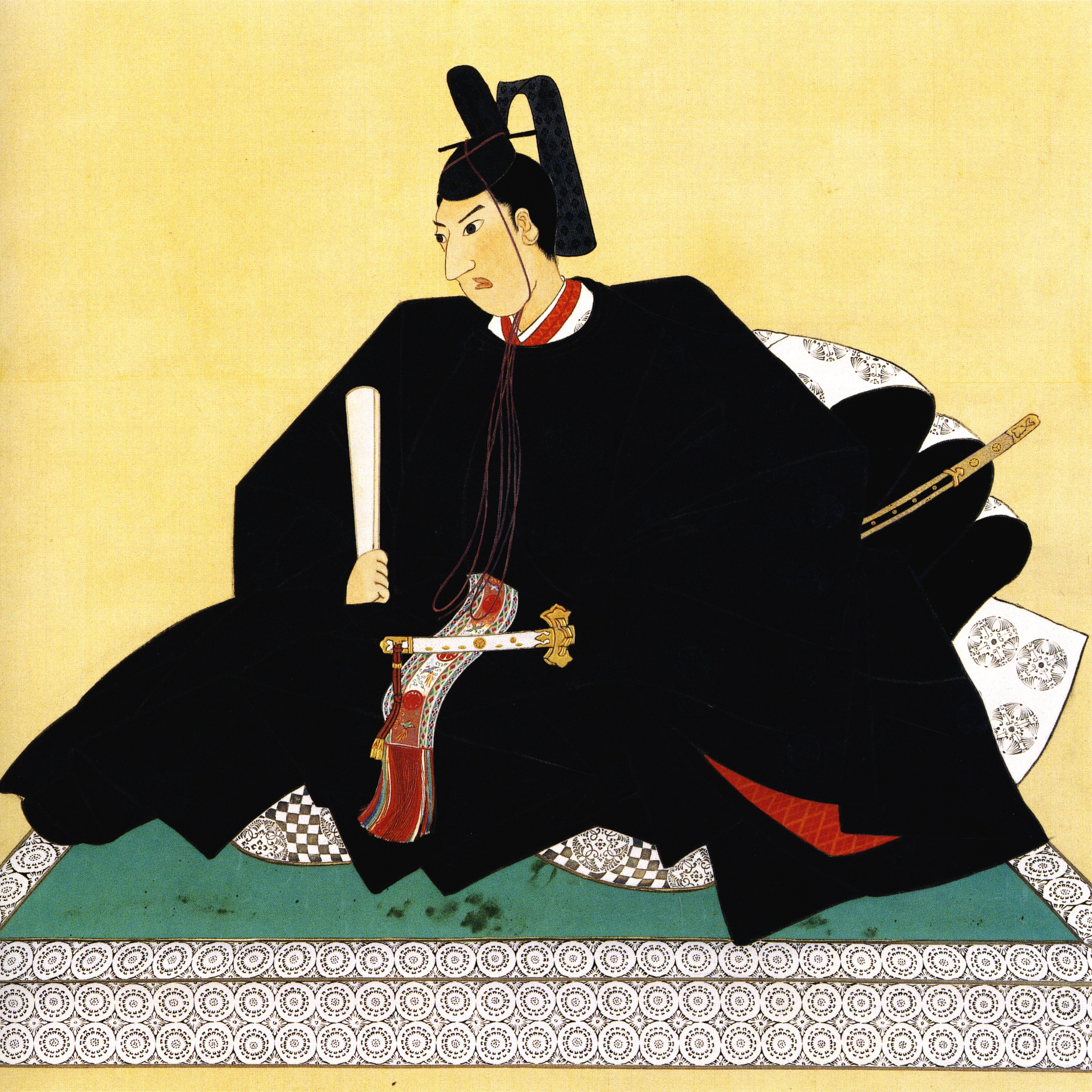

Shōgun
- In office 14 August 1858 – 29 August 1866
- Monarch: Kōmei
- Preceded by: Tokugawa Iesada
- Succeeded by: Tokugawa Yoshinobu

Personal details
- Born: 17 July 1846 Minato, Edo, Japan
- Died: 29 August 1866 (aged 20) Osaka Castle, Japan
- Spouse: Princess Kazu
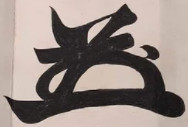
- Signature

Tokugawa Iemochi (徳川 家茂; 17 July 1846 – 29 August 1866) was a Japanese samurai, daimyo and the 14th shōgun of the Tokugawa shogunate of Japan, who held office from 1858 until his death in 1866. During his reign there was much internal turmoil as a result of the "re-opening" of Japan to western nations. Iemochi's reign also saw a weakening of the shogunate.

Iemochi died in 1866 and was buried in Zōjō-ji. His Buddhist name was Shonmyoin.

== Biography ==
Iemochi, known in his childhood as Kikuchiyo (菊千代), was the eldest son of the 11th-generation Wakayama Domain lord Tokugawa Nariyuki (1801–1846) with his concubine known as Jitsujoin and was born in the domain's residence in Edo (modern-day Minato-ku in Tokyo). Nariyuki was a younger son of the 11th shōgun, Tokugawa Ienari.

In 1847, at age 1, he was adopted as the heir of the 12th-generation daimyō Tokugawa Narikatsu, and succeeded him in 1850, taking the name Tokugawa Yoshitomi following his coming of age in 1851. In 1858 he had audience with shōgun Iesada and his wife, Atsuhime shortly after he was adopted as their son and named as the successor to the main Tokugawa house. The choice of Yoshitomi was not without conflict; there were other factions in the government who supported Tokugawa Yoshinobu or Matsudaira Naritami for shōgun; both of them, unlike Yoshitomi, were adults. After assuming the office of shogun, Yoshitomi changed his name to Iemochi.

Before Iesada died he give his will to Ii Naosuke, that:

- First, Ii Naosuke must help Iemochi at administration until Iemochi was old enough to rule.
- Second, all political issues must be discussed with Tenshoin, as Iemochi's mother.

As part of the kōbu gattai ("Union of Court and Bakufu") movement, On 11 February 1862, Iemochi married Princess Kazu, daughter of Emperor Ninko. Princess Kazu refused to use the title "Midaidokoro", and instead only used the title "Miya".

On 22 April 1863 (Bunkyū 3, 5th day of the 3rd month), shōgun Iemochi traveled in a great procession to the capital. He had been summoned by the emperor, and had 3,000 retainers as escort. This was the first time since the visit of Iemitsu in the Kan'ei era, 230 years before, that a shogun had visited Kyoto.

His early death at the age of 20 put an end to his short marriage with princess Kazu-no-Miya. Before he died he adopted a son, Tayasu Kamenosuke (later known as Tokugawa Iesato), as his heir. At that time Tayasu Kamenosuke was only 3 years old, but as the Tokugawa shogunate was at war with Chōshū, the adult Yoshinobu was appointed the fifteenth shōgun. Shōgun Yoshinobu then adopted Iemochi's adopted son, Tayasu Kamenosuke. After Iemochi's death, Kazu-no-Miya changed her name to Seikan'in no Miya. The cause of Iemochi's death is widely reported as heart failure due to beriberi, a disease caused by thiamine (vitamin B_{1}) deficiency.

His successor, Tokugawa Yoshinobu, was the last Tokugawa shōgun and witnessed the end of the shogunate, which gave way to the Meiji Restoration.

== Family ==
- Father: Tokugawa Nariyuki (1801–1846)
- Mother: Jitsujoin (1821–1904)
- Adoptive fathers:
  - Tokugawa Narikatsu (1820–1849)
  - Tokugawa Iesada
- Adoptive Mother: Tenshō-in
- Wife: Kazu-no-Miya Chikako
- Concubine:
  - Oyuri no Kata (1850–1880) later Shoko-in
  - Ohina no Kata (1846–1862) daughter of Shimazu Tadafuyu also niece of Tenshō-in
- Adopted son:
  - Tokugawa Mochitsugu
  - Tokugawa Iesato

== Eras of Iemochi's bakufu ==
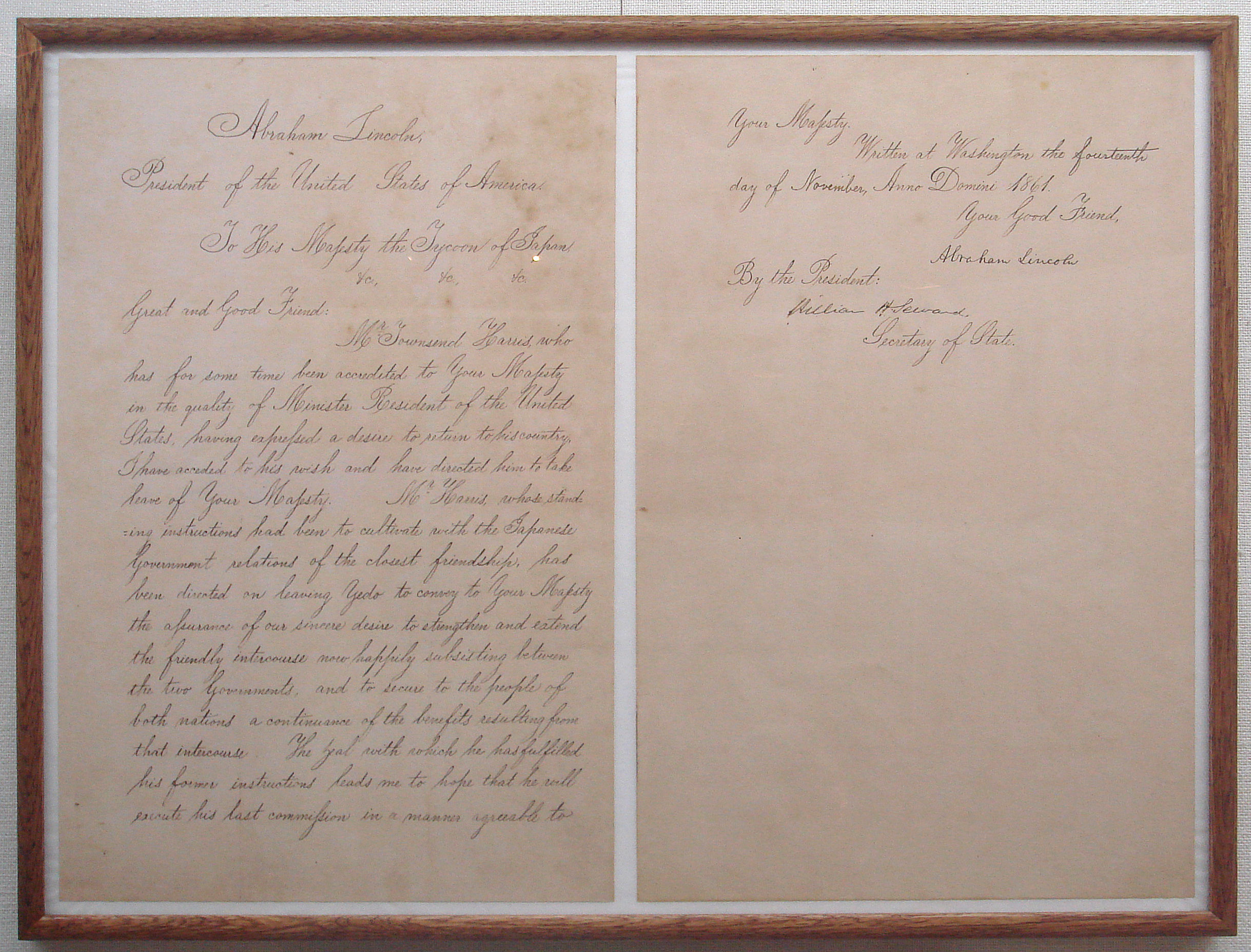
Letter of Abraham Lincoln to shōgun Tokugawa Iemochi announcing the departure of Townsend Harris. 14 November 1861.

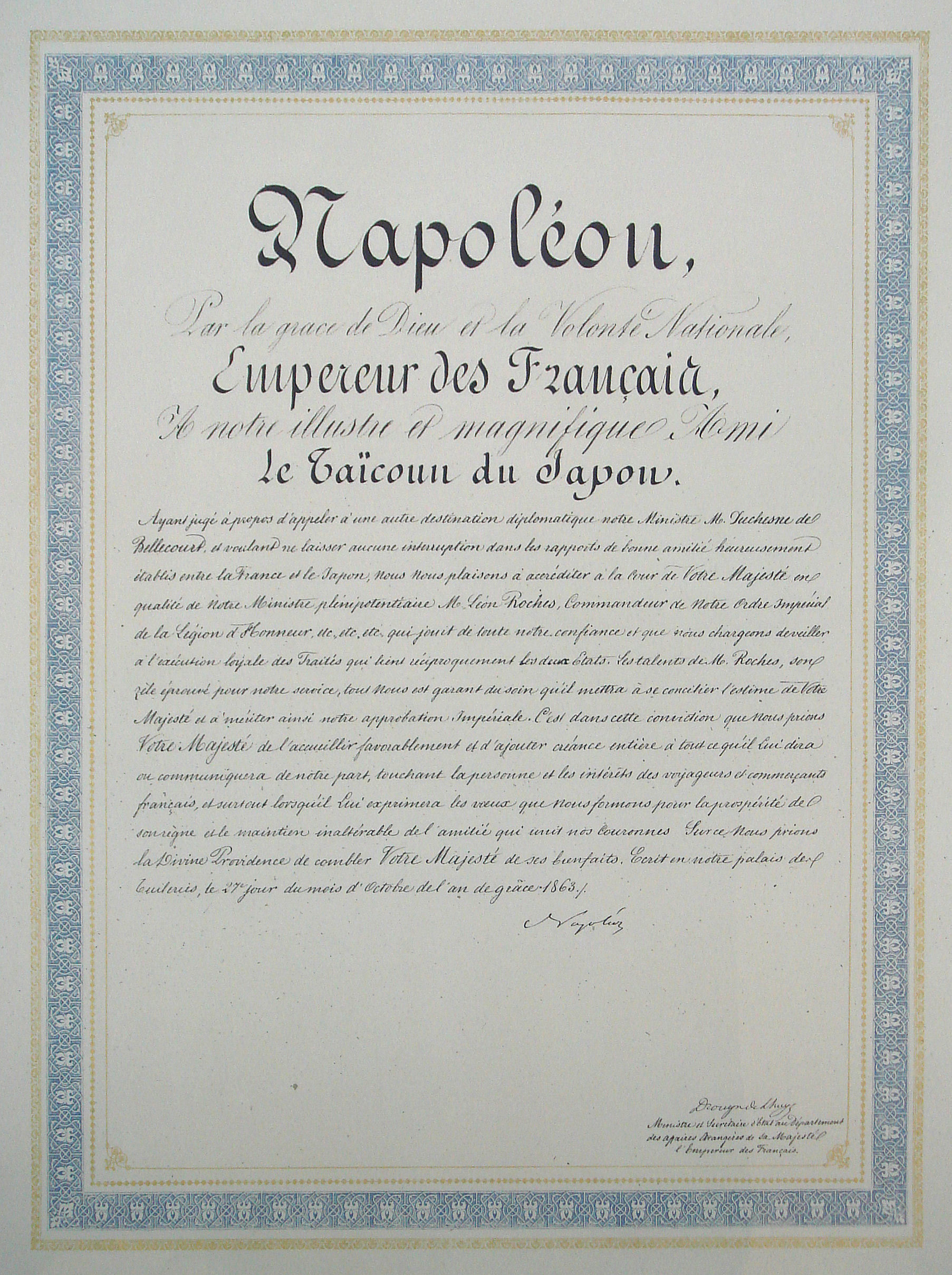
Letter of Napoleon III to "Taïcoun" Tokugawa Iemochi nominating Léon Roches, in replacement of Duchesne de Bellecourt, 27 October 1863. Diplomatic Record Office of the Ministry of Foreign Affairs (Japan).

The years in which Iemochi was shōgun are more specifically identified by more than one era name or nengō.

- Ansei (1854–1860)
- Man'en (1860–1861)
- Bunkyū (1861–1864)
- Genji (1864–1865)
- Keiō (1865–1868)

== Notes ==
Royal titles
Preceded by Tokugawa Narikatsu	Lord of Kishū: Tokugawa Iemochi; 1858–1866	Succeeded by Tokugawa Mochitsugu
Military offices
Preceded by Tokugawa Iesada	Shōgun: Tokugawa Iemochi; 1858–1866	Succeeded by Tokugawa Yoshinobu
