= Keiō Reforms =

Government reforms in Japan

The Keiō Reforms (慶応の改革, Keiō no kaikaku) were an array of new policies introduced in 1864 to 1867 by the Tokugawa shogunate of Japan. The reforms were created in reaction to the rising violence on the part of Satsuma domain as well as other domains. The initial steps taken during this period became a key part of the reforms and changes made during the rule of Emperor Meiji.

When the shōgun and Emperor happened to both die at the same time, the bakufu (shogunate government) created the Keiō Reform to keep Japan from falling into disunity or disarray. It Westernized many aspects of the system of bureaucracy, the military, and the economy, focusing on governmental promotions by merit (not by birth) and trade policies with other nations.

The bakufu hoped that these Reforms would somehow end the Rebellions of Satsuma and Chōshū – which did not happen. The rebels did not wish to see the bakufu profit from these changes which were so close to the core of what the rebels had been fighting against all along.

This reform period was preceded by three others during the Edo period: the Kyōhō reforms (1722–1730), the Kansei reforms (1787–1793) and the Tenpō reforms (1841–1843).

== Chronology ==
The shogunate's interventions had only limited success. In addition to the death of the shōgun Iemochi and the death of Emperor Kōmei, intervening factors exacerbated some of the conditions which the shogun intended to ameliorate.

- September 28, 1866 (Keiō 2, 20th day of the 8th month): Shogun Iemochi died at Osaka; and the bakufu petitioned that Hitotsubashi Yoshinobu should be appointed as his successor.
- January 10, 1867 (Keiō 2, 5th day of the 12th month): Yoshinobu was appointed shogun.
- January 30, 1867 (Keiō 2, 25th day of the 12th month): Emperor Komei died.
