= Tenpō Reforms =

Government reforms in Japan

The Tenpō Reforms (天保の改革, tenpō no kaikaku) were an array of economic policies introduced between 1841 and 1843 by the Tokugawa shogunate in Japan. These reforms were efforts to resolve perceived problems in military, economic, agricultural, financial and religious systems. The changes were intended to address problems in local politics, but they were also addressed more broadly to "domestic uneasiness." The perceived need for change led to the arrest of many prominent political figures and writers. The reforms became a precursor of reforms initiated after the Meiji Restoration two decades later. This reform movement was related to three others during the Edo period: the Kyōhō reforms (1722–1730), the Kansei reforms (1787–1793) and the Keiō Reforms (1864–1867).

== Background ==
Tokugawa Ienari became the 11th shogun in 1788 and ruled Japan for about half a century, the longest reign of any shogun in history. Whenever the shogunate faced financial difficulties, it lowered the gold and silver content of its coins to prevent financial deterioration, which caused inflation and made life difficult for the common people. In 1830, famine and rebellion broke out in many parts of Japan, and in 1837, the Ōshio Hehachirō Rebellion broke out. After Ienari's death in 1841, Mizuno Tadakuni, a Rōjū (老中, Elder), took over political power and began the Tempō Reforms to revive the economy.

== Overview ==
The first thing Mizuno did was to crack down on entertainment and ban luxury goods. The "Frugal Ordinance" was enacted, restricting the entertainment culture of the chōnin (町人, townspeople). Many rakugo, kōdan, kabuki, and bunraku theaters were closed, and shops selling various goods were forced to close. The content of ukiyo-e prints and popular literature was also regulated. For example, the relocation of the theater in Asakusa on the outskirts of Edo, the closure of the koyi venue, the 7th generation Kabuki performer Ichikawa Danjuro, and the popular literature writers Tamenaga Shunsui and Ryūtei Tanehiko were punished by the Shogunate and banned the reconstruction of Nakamuraza, a prosperous commercial street that burned down in 1841. Kabuki performers are required to wear hats when they go out to avoid being too conspicuous.

Mizuno ordered merchants and craftsmen to lower their prices, but they responded by reducing the quantity and quality of their goods. Mizuno believed that the merchants' guilds called kabunakama, were the cause of the high prices and had them disbanded, but instead they disrupted the distribution system. As a result, the merchants' guilds were allowed to re-establish themselves in 1851. He brought back the peasants who had migrated from the countryside to Edo to prevent social instability and raised taxes from the peasants.

In Mito domain, an annual calendar (年中行事 nenjū gyōji) was set up during this period to bring order to society. Families were required to register themselves at the nearest Shinto shrine annually on the 16th of the first and seventh months. A Shinto festival (muramura jingi), meeting (jingi kasihū) or pilgrimage (muramura kamimōde) was scheduled once a month. The popular bon festival was rewritten as Sensosai, the Ancestor Festival, and was held twice a year. Buddhism was written out of this religious calendar, since the government revoked its support for existing Buddhist institutions.

In 1842, Mizuno revoked the 1825 Edict to Repel Foreign Vessels issued during the reign of Tokugawa Ienari and replaced it with a policy of forcing foreign ships to leave by providing them with firewood and water. Instead, to protect the country from foreign ships, he required each coastal domain to prepare cannons and submit plans for a watchtower, and he also proposed a policy of placing a 40-kilometer square area around Edo and Osaka, respectively, under the direct control of the shogunate. The bureaucrats and common people in the areas to be placed under the direct control of the shogunate reacted strongly against this policy, and Mizuno was eventually removed from his position as Rōjū. This was the end of the reform. When Mizuno was dismissed, the common people exploded with emotion, surrounding Mizuno's residence, cursing him and throwing stones at his house. Eventually, Mizuno was reinstated to the position of Rōjū to deal with foreign ships, but his insistence that Japan should open up to the outside world was not accepted by other shogunate actors, and the era moved into the Bakumatsu era, when Japan was divided over the issue of opening up to the outside world.

== Chronology ==
The shogunate's interventions were only partly successful. Intervening factors like earthquakes, famine and other disasters exacerbated some of the conditions which the shōgun intended to ameliorate.

- July 20, 1835 (Tenpō 6, 14th day of the 6th month): Earthquake in Sanriku (Latitude: 37.900/Longitude: 141.900), 7.6 magnitude on the Richter Scale....Click link to NOAA/Japan: Significant Earthquake Database
- April 25, 1843 (Tenpō 14, 26th day of the 3rd month): Earthquake in Yezo, Kushiro, Nemuro (Latitude: 41.800/Longitude: 144.800), 8.4 magnitude on the Richter Scale.
