= Kyōhō Reforms =

Government reforms in Japan

The Kyōhō Reforms (享保の改革, kyōhō no kaikaku) were an array of economic and cultural policies introduced by the Tokugawa shogunate between 1722–1730 during the Edo period to improve its political and social status. These reforms were instigated by the eighth Tokugawa shōgun of Japan, Tokugawa Yoshimune, encompassing the first 20 years of his shogunate. The name Kyōhō Reforms, refers to the Kyōhō period (July 1716 – April 1736).

== Purpose and scope of the reforms ==
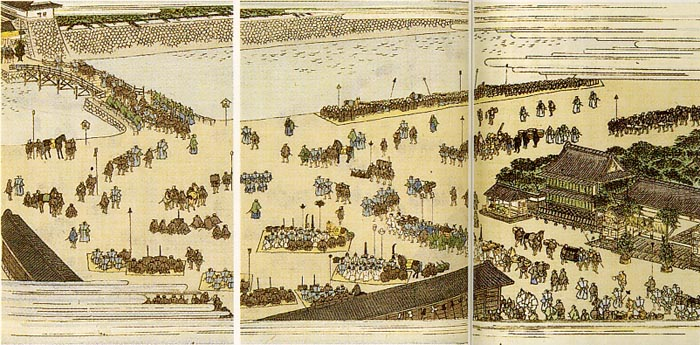
En masse Attendance of Daimyo at Edo Castle on a Festive Day from the Tokugawa Seiseiroku, National Museum of Japanese History

The reforms were aimed at making the Tokugawa shogunate financially solvent, and to some degree, to improve its political and social security. Because of the tensions between Confucian ideology and the economic reality of Tokugawa Japan (Confucian principles that money was defiling versus the necessity for a cash economy), Yoshimune found it necessary to shelve certain Confucian principles that were hampering his reform process.

The Kyōhō Reforms included an emphasis on frugality, as well as the formation of merchant guilds that allowed greater control and taxation. Previously banned, Western books (except those relating or referring to Christianity) were allowed again, to encourage the import of Western knowledge and technology (rangaku).

The alternate attendance (sankin-kōtai) rules were relaxed. This policy was a burden on daimyōs, due to the cost of maintaining two households and moving people and goods between them, while maintaining a show of status and defending their lands when they were absent. The Kyōhō Reforms relieved this burden somewhat in an effort to gain support for the shogunate from the daimyōs.

== Chronology ==
The shogunate's interventions were only partly successful. Intervening factors like famine, floods and other disasters exacerbated some of the conditions which the shōgun intended to ameliorate.

- 1730 (Kyōhō 15): The Tokugawa shogunate officially recognizes the Dojima Rice Market in Osaka; and bakufu supervisors (nengyoji) are appointed to monitor the market and to collect taxes. The transactions relating to rice exchanges developed into securities exchanges, used primarily for transactions in public securities. The development of improved agriculture production caused the price of rice to fall in mid-Kyōhō.
- August 3, 1730 (Kyōhō 15, 20th day of the 6th month): A fire broke out in Muromachi and 3,790 houses were burnt. Over 30,000 looms in Nishi-jin were destroyed. The bakufu distributed rice.
- 1732 (Kyōhō 17): Swarms of locusts devastated crops in agricultural communities around the inland sea, resulting in the Kyōhō famine.

== Successive reforms ==
This reform movement was followed by three others during the Edo period: the Kansei reforms (1787–1793), the Tenpō reforms of the (1841–1843), and the Keiō reforms (1864–1867).
