= Toyin Saraki =

Nigerian lawyer (born 1964)

Omoba Toyin Saraki

First Lady of Kwara State
- In role 29 May 2003 – 29 May 2011
- Governor: Bukola Saraki

Personal details
- Born: 6 September 1964 (age 62) Lagos, Nigeria
- Spouse: Bukola Saraki
- Education: SOAS, University of London; King's College London

Toyin Ojora-Saraki LLB, LLM, BL (born 6 September 1964) is a Nigerian global health advocate, healthcare philanthropist and the Founder-President of Wellbeing Foundation Africa.

== Early life and education ==
Toyin Saraki was born into the Ojora and Adele royal families of Lagos, Nigeria, as the daughter of the Yoruba aristocrat Oloye Adekunle Ojora, the Otunba of Lagos, and granddaughter of Omoba Abdulaziz Ojora, the Olori Omo-Oba of Lagos. On her maternal side, she is the daughter of the Erelu Oodua, Iyaloye Ojuolape Ojora (née Akinfe), and granddaughter of Iyaloye Sabainah Akinkugbe, who was also herself a chieftess. The Akinfes are a titled family of industrialists from Ondo State.

She had her elementary education at St Saviour's School, Ikoyi, Lagos, and Holy Child College Lagos, after which she went to the United Kingdom and attended Roedean School, Brighton. She achieved her L.L.B degree in law from the London School of Oriental and African Studies and her L.L.M in International Economic Law from King's College London, both of the University of London. She returned to Nigeria and was called to the Nigerian Bar in 1989.

== Charity and philanthropy ==
As Founder-President of Wellbeing Foundation Africa (WBFA), Mrs Toyin Saraki is a Nigerian philanthropist with two decades of advocacy covering maternal, newborn and child health, gender-based discrimination and violence, improving education, socio-economic empowerment and community livelihoods in Africa. She is a global health advocate of Sustainable Development Goals in Nigeria, reducing the rate of maternal and infant mortality. She also launched a social media campaigns through Wellbeing Foundation Africa called #MaternalMonday in 2012.

She contributed to the establishment of the Lifestream Charity in 1993 and is an advocate of the United Nations Every Woman Every Child campaign. She is on the board of the Global Foundation for the Elimination of Domestic Violence and the board of the Africa Justice Foundation.

Saraki was appointed to the International Steering Council of ICPD25 in 2019, is a Board Observer to the WHO Partnership for Maternal Newborn and Child Health PMNCH, and is also a Special Advisor to the WHO Africa Regional Office, Newborn Champion for Save the Children Nigeria, Universal Health Coverage Champion by Devex, United Nations Population Fund UNFPA Family Planning Champion, White Ribbon Alliance Global Champion, and was appointed the Inaugural Global Goodwill Ambassador to the International Confederation of Midwives in 2014.

== Personal life ==
As the hereditary Princess Royal of the Ijora Kingdom and Iganmu Lands, Lagos, and the Yon Sabuke of Kaiama Kingdom, Kwara, she was installed as the Erelu Bobajiro of Iru Land, Lagos, in June 2021. She is married to Senator Bukola Saraki, a former president of the Nigerian Senate who holds the title of the Waziri of the Ilorin Emirate in the Nigerian chieftaincy system. They have four children.
