= Bunkyū =

Period of Japanese history (1861–1864)

Reigning emperor Kōmei-tennō (孝明天皇)

Bunkyū (文久) was a Japanese era name (年号, nengō; "year name") after Man'en and before Genji. This period spanned the years from March 1861 through March 1864. The reigning emperor was Kōmei-tennō (孝明天皇).

== Change of era ==
- March 29, 1861 (Man'en 2/Bunkyū 1, 19th day of the 2nd month) Bunkyū gannen (文久元年): The new era name of Bunkyū (meaning "Literate Story") was created because of a belief drawn from Chinese astrology that the 58th year of any zodiacal cycle brings great changes. The previous era ended and a new one commenced in Man'en 2.

== Events of the Bunkyū era ==
- 1861 (Bunkyu 1): Ukai Gyokusen established the first commercial photography studio (Eishin-dō) in Edo.
- January 1862 (Bunkyū 1, 12th month): The Bonin Islands (Ogasawara Islands) are re-confirmed as a territory of Japan, following up "discovery" of the islands in Kanbun 10 (1670) and a shogunate expedition to the islands in Enpō 3 (1675).
- 1862 (Bunkyū 2): The Bunkyū Reforms relax restrictions on daimyōs which had been imposed by former Tairō Ii Naosuke in the Ansei era.
- September 14, 1862 (Bunkyū 2, 21st day of the 8th month): Namamugi Incident. Satsuma retainers kill English merchant Charles Lennox Richardson at Namamugi on the Tōkaidō road.
- April 22, 1863 (Bunkyū 3, 5th day of the 3rd month): Shōgun Iemochi travelled in a great procession to the capital. He had been summoned by the emperor, and had 3,000 retainers as escort. This was the first time that a shōgun had visited Heian-kyō since the visit of Iemitsu in Kan'ei 11 (1634) – 230 years before.
- April 28, 1863 (Bunkyū 3, 11th day of the 3rd month): Emperor Komei made an Imperial progress to the Kamo Shrines. He was accompanied by the shōgun, all the principal officials and many feudal lords. This was the first Imperial progress since Emperor Go-Mizunoo visited Nijō Castle more than 230 years before; and no Emperor had visited Kamo since Emperor Go-Daigo honored both shrines in Kenmu 1 (1334).
- April 29, 1863 (Bunkyū 3, 12th day of the 3rd month): In the early morning, Aizu accepts under its patronage the men of the Rōshigumi, who went on to form the Shinsengumi.
- May 2, 1863 (Bunkyū 3, 15th day of the 3rd month): The Rōshigumi men who were taken under Aizu patronage go to Konkaikōmyōji Temple to make their first formal, public appearance, and pay their respects to their new patron, Matsudaira Katamori. As Katamori is unavailable, they are instead met by two of his senior retainers.
- August 15–17, 1863 (Bunkyū 3, 2nd-4th of the 7th month): Bombardment of Kagoshima in retaliation for the Namamugi Incident.

== See also ==
- Japanese calendar

== Notes ==
Preceded by Man'en (万延)	Era or nengō Bunkyū (文久); 29 March 1861 – 26 March 1864	Succeeded by Genji (元治)
