= Tokugawa shogunate =

Military government of Japan (1603–1868)

Tokugawa shogunate: 徳川幕府; Tokugawa bakufu
- 1603–1868
- Mon of the Tokugawa clan

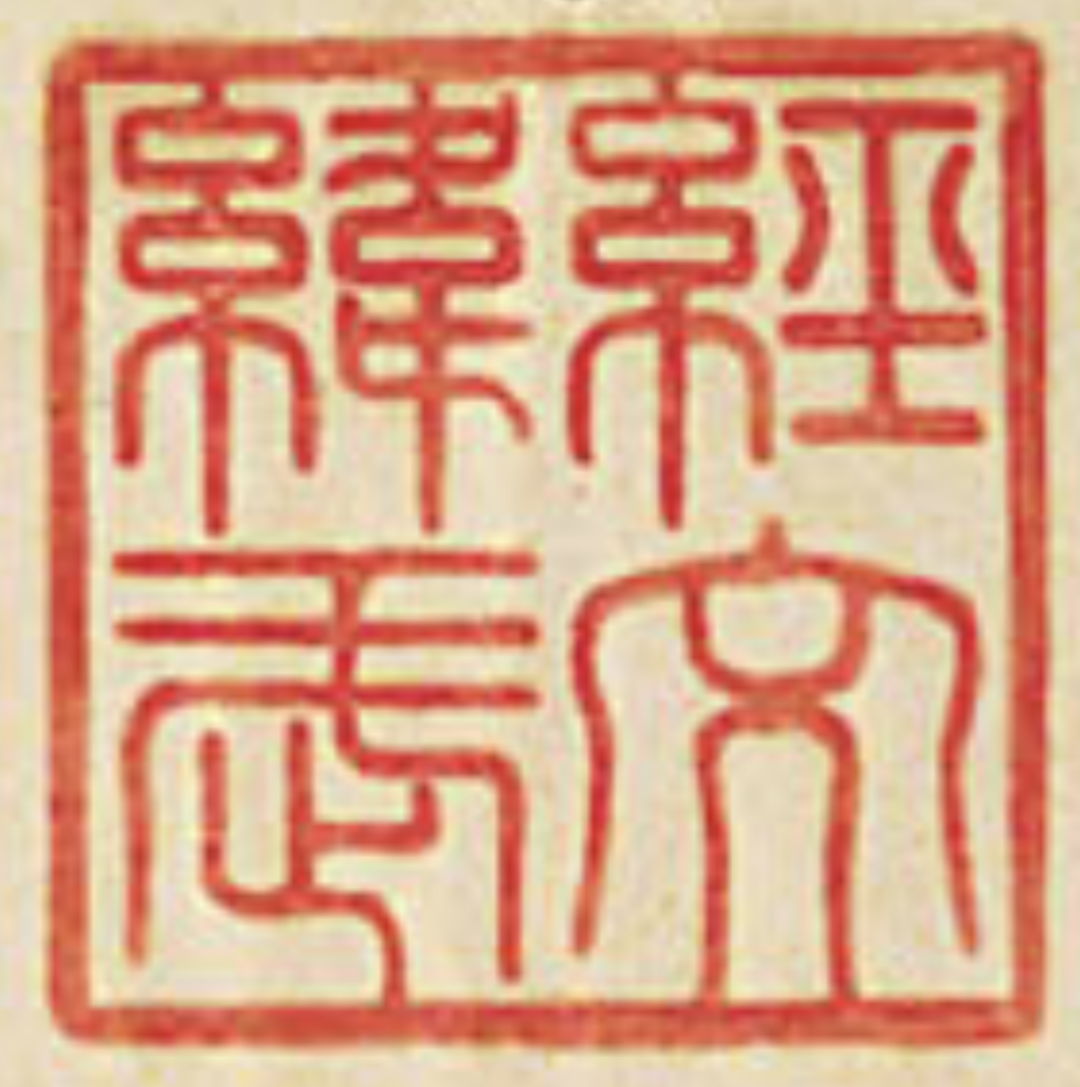
- National seal 經文緯武 (from 1857)

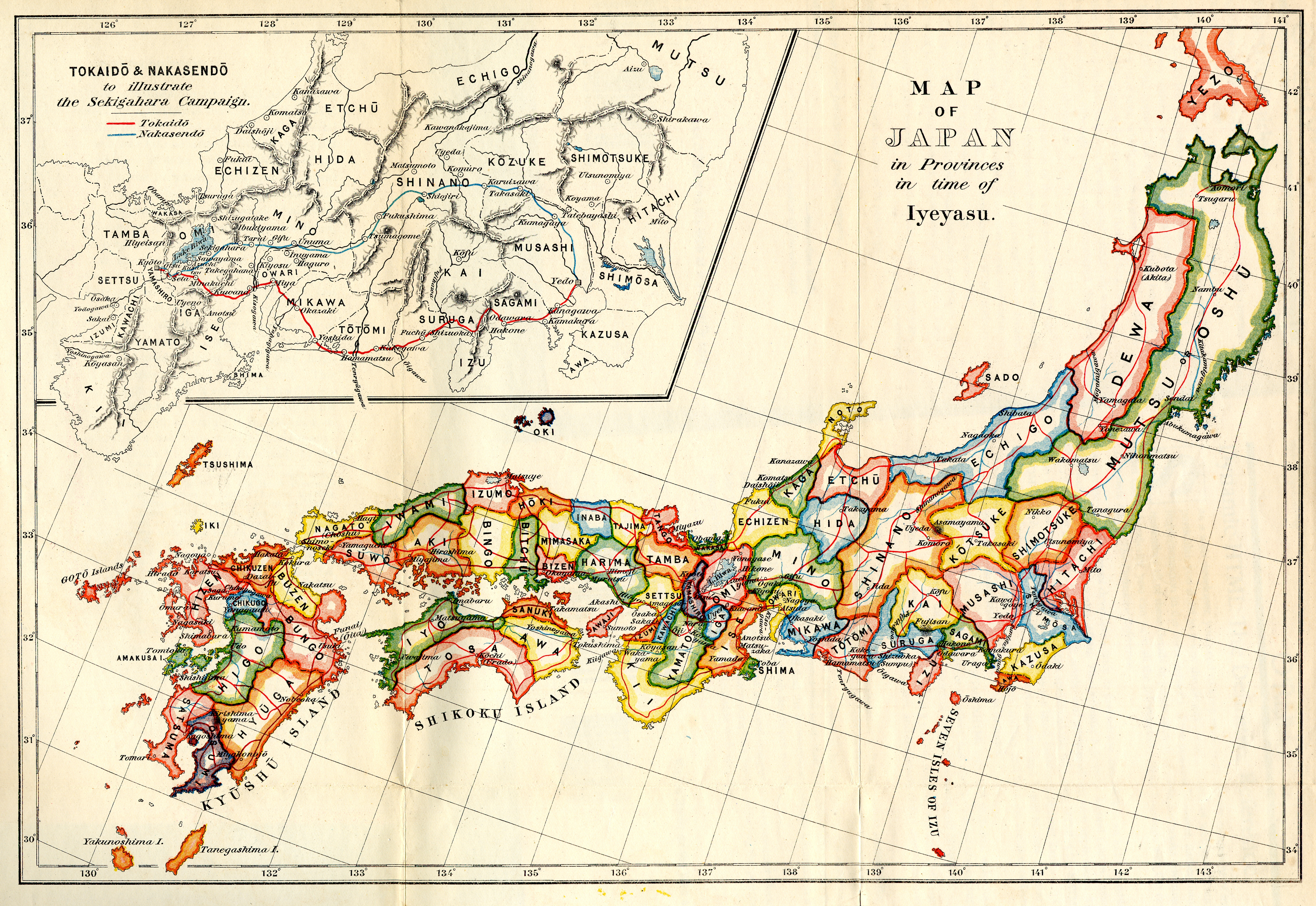
- Capital: Edo (Shōgun's residence); Heian-kyō (Emperor's palace)
- Largest city: Osaka (1603–1613); Heian-kyō (1613–1638); Edo (1638–1868)
- Common languages: Early Modern Japanese; Modern Japanese
- Religion: State religions: Japanese Buddhism (particularly Tendai, Jōdo, and Shingon); Confucianism; Others: Shinto; Shinbutsu-shūgō; Roman Catholicism (banned, until 1853)
- Government: Feudal monarchy under a hereditary military dictatorship
- Emperor
  - 1603–1611 (first): Go-Yōzei
  - 1867–1868 (last): Meiji
- Shōgun
  - 1603–1605 (first): Tokugawa Ieyasu
  - 1866–1867 (last): Tokugawa Yoshinobu
- Historical era: Edo period
  - Battle of Sekigahara: 21 October 1600
  - Shogunate established: 24 March 1600
  - Siege of Osaka: 8 November 1614
  - Sakoku Edict of 1635: 1635
  - Kanagawa Treaty: 31 March 1854
  - Harris Treaty: 29 July 1858
  - Meiji Restoration: 3 January 1868
- Currency: Tokugawa coinage
Preceded by	Succeeded by
Azuchi–Momoyama period	Empire of Japan; Republic of Ezo
- Today part of: Japan

The Tokugawa shogunate, (Note: /ˌtoʊkuːˈɡɑːwə/ TOH-koo-GAH-wə; Japanese: 徳川幕府, romanized: Tokugawa bakufu, IPA: [to.kɯ.ɡa.wa baꜜ.kɯ̥.ɸɯ, -ŋa.wa-]) also known as the Edo shogunate, (Note: Japanese: 江戸幕府, Hepburn: Edo bakufu; IPA: [e.do baꜜ.kɯ̥.ɸɯ]) was the military government of Japan during the Edo period from 1603 to 1868.

The Tokugawa shogunate was established by Tokugawa Ieyasu after victory at the Battle of Sekigahara, ending the civil wars of the Sengoku period following the collapse of the Ashikaga shogunate. Ieyasu became the shōgun, and the Tokugawa clan governed Japan from Edo Castle in the eastern city of Edo (Tokyo) along with the daimyō lords of the samurai class.

The Tokugawa shogunate organized Japanese society under the strict Tokugawa class system and banned the entry of most foreigners under the isolationist policies of sakoku to promote political stability. Japanese subjects were also barred from leaving the country. The Tokugawa shoguns governed Japan in a feudal system, with each daimyō administering a han (feudal domain), although the country was still nominally organized as imperial provinces. Under the Tokugawa shogunate, Japan experienced rapid economic growth and urbanization, which led to the rise of the merchant class and Ukiyo culture.

The Tokugawa shogunate declined during the Bakumatsu period from 1853 and was overthrown by supporters of the Imperial Court in the Meiji Restoration in 1868. The Empire of Japan was established under the Meiji government, and Tokugawa loyalists continued to fight in the Boshin War until the defeat of the Republic of Ezo at the Battle of Hakodate in June 1869.

== History ==
Following the Sengoku period ("Warring States period"), the central government had been largely re-established by Oda Nobunaga during the Azuchi–Momoyama period. After the Battle of Sekigahara in 1600, central authority fell to Tokugawa Ieyasu. While many daimyō who fought against him were extinguished or had their holdings reduced, Ieyasu was committed to retaining the daimyō and the han (domains) as the foundations of his new shogunate. Daimyō who sided with Ieyasu were rewarded, and some of Ieyasu's former vassals were made daimyō of strategically positioned regions across Japan. The sankin-kotai policy, in an effort to constrain rebellions by the daimyō, mandated the housing of wives and children of the daimyō in the capital as hostages.

A period of peace occurred between the Siege of Osaka in 1615 and the Keian Uprising in 1651. This period saw the bakufu (shogunate's administration) prioritise civil administration, while civil society witnessed a surge in trade and industrial activities. Trade under the reign of Ieyasu saw much new wealth created by mining and goods manufacturing, which resulted in a rural population flow to urban areas. By the Genroku period (1688–1704) Japan saw a period of material prosperity and the blossoming of the arts, such as the early development of ukiyo-e by Moronobu. The reign of Tokugawa Yoshimune (1716–1745) saw poor harvests and a fall in tax revenue in the early 1720s; as a result he pushed for the Kyoho reforms to repair the finances of the bakufu as he believed the military aristocracy was losing its power against the rich merchants and landowners.

Society in the Tokugawa period, unlike in previous shogunates, was supposedly based on the strict class hierarchy originally established by Toyotomi Hideyoshi. The daimyō were at the top, followed by the warrior-caste of samurai, with the farmers, artisans, and traders ranking below. In some parts of the country, particularly smaller regions, daimyō, and samurai were more or less identical, since daimyō might be trained as samurai, and samurai might act as local rulers.

The largely inflexible nature of this social stratification system unleashed disruptive forces over time. Taxes on the peasantry were set at fixed amounts that did not account for inflation or other changes in monetary value. As a result, the tax revenues collected by the samurai landowners increasingly declined over time. A 2017 study found that peasant rebellions and desertion lowered tax rates and inhibited state growth in the Tokugawa shogunate. In total, historians have documented approximately 3,000 such outbreaks of peasant unrest and violence against authority between 1590 and 1871.

By mid-1734, both the shōgun and daimyō were hampered by financial difficulties, whereas more wealth flowed to the merchant class. Peasant uprisings and samurai discontent became increasingly prevalent. Some reforms were enacted to attend to these issues such as the Kansei reforms (1787–1793) by Matsudaira Sadanobu. He bolstered the bakufu's rice stockpiles and mandated daimyō to follow suit. He cut down urban spending, allocated reserves for potential famines, and urged city-dwelling peasants to return to rural areas.

By 1800, Japan included five cities with over 100,000 residents, and three among the world's twenty cities that had more than 300,000 inhabitants. Edo likely claimed the title of the world's most populous city, housing over one million people.

=== Late Tokugawa shogunate (1853–1867) ===
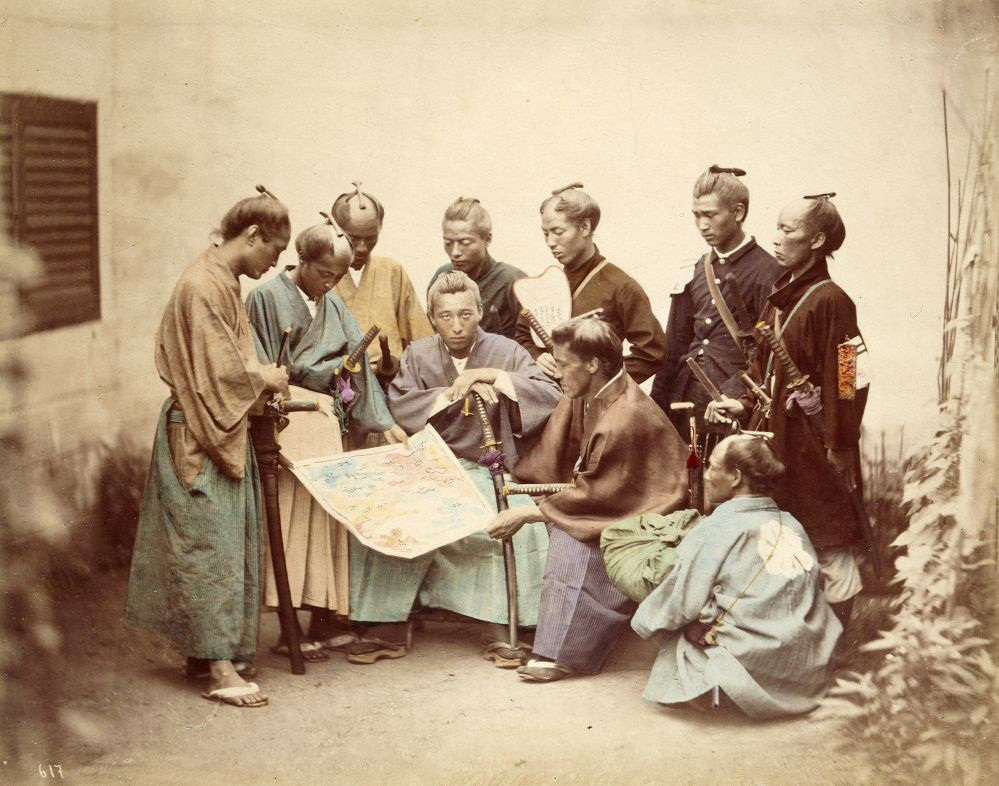
Samurai of the Shimazu clan

The late Tokugawa shogunate (Bakumatsu) was the period between 1853 and 1867, during which Japan ended its isolationist foreign policy called sakoku and modernized from a feudal shogunate to the Meiji government. The 1850s saw growing resentment by the tozama daimyōs and anti-Western sentiment following the arrival of a U.S. Navy fleet under the command of Matthew C. Perry (which led to the forced opening of Japan). The major ideological and political factions during this period were divided into the pro-imperialist Ishin Shishi (nationalist patriots) and the shogunate forces; aside from the dominant two groups, other factions attempted to use the chaos of the Bakumatsu era to seize personal power.

An alliance of daimyō and the emperor succeeded in overthrowing the shogunate, which came to an official end in 1868 with the resignation of the 15th Tokugawa shogun, Tokugawa Yoshinobu, leading to the "restoration" (王政復古, Ōsei fukko) of imperial rule. Some loyal retainers of the shogun continued to fight during the Boshin War that followed but were eventually defeated in the notable Battle of Toba–Fushimi.

== Religious policy ==
=== Christians under the Shogunate ===
Followers of Catholic Christians first began appearing in Japan during the 16th century.

In 1600, when English sailor William Adams and his Dutch colleague Jan Joosten arrived at Japan, they told Ieyasu about the world situation, including that there were many conflicts in Europe, and that the Jesuits and other Catholics (e.g. Portuguese, Spanish), who had been proselytizing Christianity in Japan, and the Protestants (e.g. Dutch, English) were on different sides and were in conflict with each other. Ieyasu reportedly took a liking to them for their frankness and regarded them as trustworthy.

While at first tolerant of Christianity, Tokugawa Ieyasu soon began to see it as a growing threat to the stability of the shogunate. His attitude changed after 1613, and persecution of Christians sharply increased, with Ieyasu completely banning Catholicism in 1614.

The hostility of Ieyasu towards Catholics was shown when he replaced Jesuit translator João Rodrigues Tçuzu with William Adams in his court in the aftermath of the Nossa Senhora da Graça incident in Nagasaki. This change of attitude is believed to be due to the Okamoto Daihachi incident, where a Catholic daimyō and shogun's official were accused of a series of crimes.

The Shimabara Rebellion is often portrayed as a Christian rebellion against violent suppression by Matsukura Katsuie. However the main academic understanding is that the rebellion was mainly by peasants against Matsukura's misgovernance, with Christians later joining the rebellion. The system introduced by the Shogunate to stamp out Catholicism after the Shimabara rebellion was the Danka system, which made affiliation of every household in Japan to the Buddhist temple compulsory.

Ieyasu's ban of Christianity is often linked with the creation of the sakoku seclusionist policies in the 1630s. His successor shoguns followed his policy, compounding upon existing laws by Ieyasu. The ban on Christianity was enforced via decrees of expulsion and mass-executions in 1613, 1622 (Great Genna Martyrdom), 1623 (Great Martyrdom of Edo) 1630, 1632 and 1634.

== Government ==
=== Shogunate and domains ===
The bakuhan system (幕藩体制, bakuhan taisei) was the feudal political system in the Edo period of Japan. Baku is an abbreviation of bakufu, meaning "military government"—that is, the shogunate. The han were the domains headed by daimyō. Beginning from Ieyasu's appointment as shogun in 1603, but especially after the Tokugawa victory in Osaka in 1615, various policies were implemented to assert the shogunate's control, which severely curtailed the daimyō' independence. The number of daimyō varied but stabilized at around 270. Although the shogunate was nominally under the control of the Emperor of Japan, it was actually governed by the shōgun, the supreme military leader.

The bakuhan system split feudal power between the shogunate in Edo and the daimyō with domains throughout Japan. The shōgun and the daimyō were all feudal lords with their own bureaucracies, policies, and territories. Provinces had a degree of sovereignty and were allowed an independent administration of the han in exchange for loyalty to the shōgun, who was responsible for foreign relations, national security, coinage, weights, measures, and transportation.

The shōgun also administered the most powerful han, the hereditary fief of the House of Tokugawa, which also included many gold and silver mines. Towards the end of the shogunate, the Tokugawa clan held around 7 million koku of land (天領 tenryō), including 2.6–2.7 million koku held by direct vassals, out of 30 million in the country. The other 23 million koku were held by other daimyō.

The number of han (roughly 270) fluctuated throughout the Edo period. They were ranked by size, which was measured as the number of koku of rice that the domain produced each year. One koku was the amount of rice necessary to feed one adult male for one year. The minimum number for a daimyō was ten thousand koku; the largest, apart from the shōgun, was more than a million koku.

==== Policies to control the daimyō ====
The main policies of the shogunate on the daimyō included:

- The principle was that each daimyō (including those who were previously independent of the Tokugawa family) submitted to the shogunate, and each han required the shogunate's recognition and was subject to its land redistributions. Daimyō swore allegiance to each shogun and acknowledged the Laws for Warrior Houses or buke shohatto.
- The sankin-kōtai ("alternate attendance") system, required daimyō to travel to and reside in Edo every other year, and for their families to remain in Edo during their absence.
- The ikkoku ichijyō rei (一国一城令), allowed each daimyō's han to retain only one fortification, at the daimyō's residence.
- The Laws for the Military Houses (buke shohatto), the first of which in 1615 forbade the building of new fortifications or repairing existing ones without bakufu approval, admitting fugitives of the shogunate, and arranging marriages of the daimyō' families without official permission. Additional rules on the samurai were issued over the years.

Although the shogun issued certain laws, such as the buke shohatto on the daimyō and the rest of the samurai class, each han administered its autonomous system of laws and taxation. The shōgun did not interfere in a han's governance unless major incompetence (such as large rebellions) was shown, nor were central taxes issued. Instead, each han provided feudal duties, such as maintaining roads and official courier stations, building canals and harbors, providing troops, and relieving famines. Daimyōs were strategically placed to check each other, and the sankin-kōtai system ensured that daimyō or their family were always in Edo, observed by the shogun.

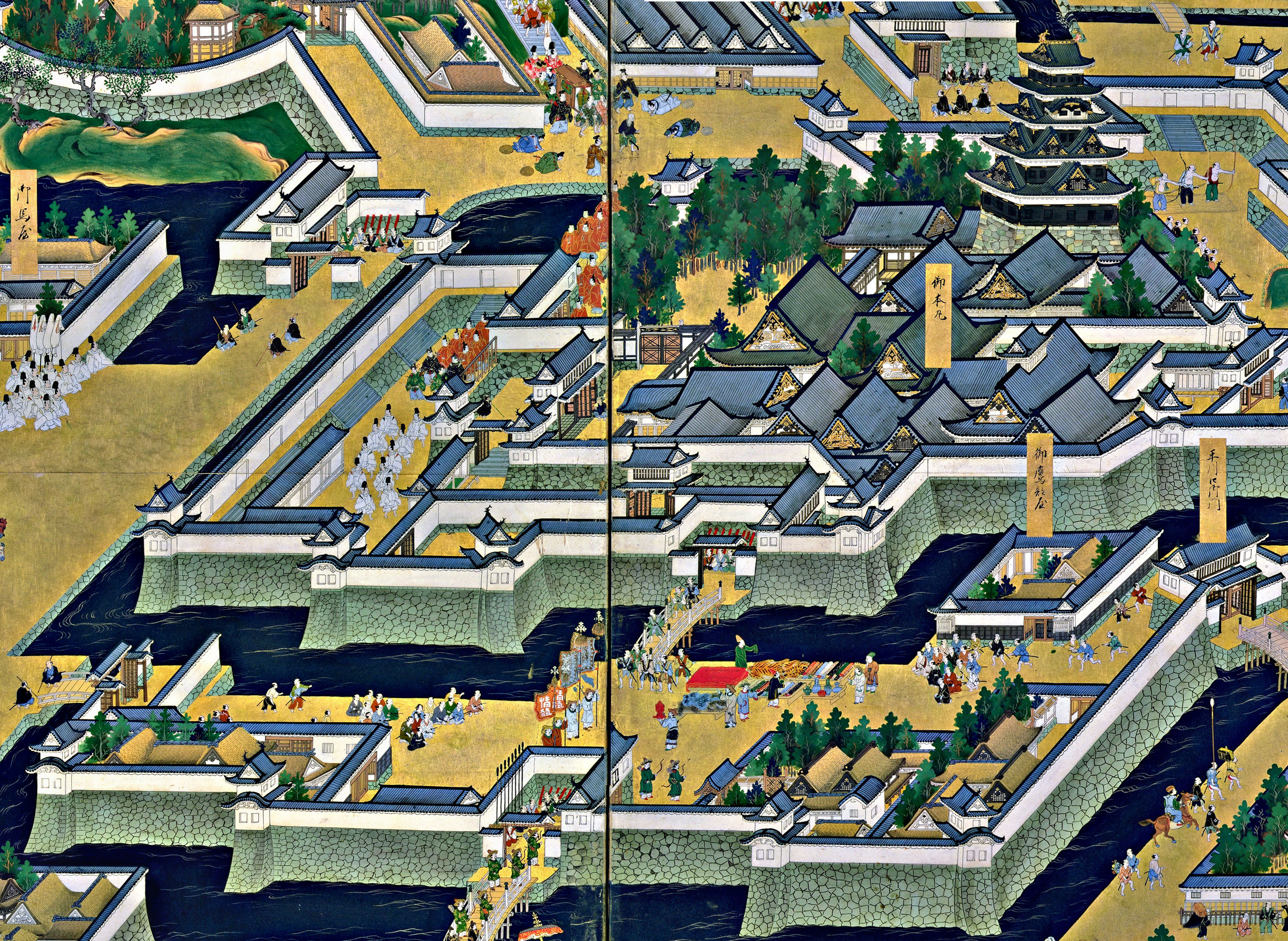
Edo Castle, 17th century

The shogunate had the power to discard, annex, and transform domains, although they were rarely and carefully exercised after the early years of the shogunate, to prevent daimyō from banding together. The sankin-kōtai system of alternative residence required each daimyō to reside in alternate years between the han and the court in Edo. During their absences from Edo, it was also required that they leave their family as hostages until their return. The hostages and the huge expenditure sankin-kōtai imposed on each han helped to ensure loyalty to the shōgun. By the 1690s, the vast majority of daimyō would be born in Edo, and most would consider it their homes. Some daimyō had little interest in their domains and needed to be begged to return "home".

In return for the centralization, peace among the daimyō was maintained; unlike in the Sengoku period, daimyō no longer worried about conflicts with one another. In addition, hereditary succession was guaranteed as internal usurpations within domains were not recognized by the shogunate.

==== Classification of daimyō ====
The Tokugawa clan further ensured loyalty by maintaining a dogmatic insistence on loyalty to the shōgun. Daimyos were classified into three main categories:

- Shinpan ("relatives") were six clans established by sons of Ieyasu, as well as certain sons of the 8th and 9th shoguns, who were made daimyō. They would provide an heir to the shogunate if the shogun did not have an heir.
- Fudai ("hereditary") were mostly vassals of Ieyasu and the Tokugawa clan before the Battle of Sekigahara. In addition to ruling their han, they served as high officials in the shogunate, although their domains tended to be smaller than those of the tozama daimyō.
- Tozama ("outsiders") were around 100 daimyō, most of whom became vassals of the Tokugawa clan after the Battle of Sekigahara. Some fought against Tokugawa forces, although some were neutral or even fought on the side of the Tokugawa clan, as allies rather than vassals. The tozama daimyō tend to have the largest han, with 11 of the 16 largest daimyō in this category.

The tozama daimyō who fought against the Tokugawa clan in the Battle of Sekigahara had their holdings reduced substantially. They were often placed in mountainous or far away areas, or placed between most trusted daimyō. Early in the Edo period, the shogunate viewed the tozama as the least likely to be loyal; over time, strategic marriages and the entrenchment of the system made the tozama less likely to rebel. In the end, however, it was still the great tozama of Satsuma, Chōshū and Tosa, and to a lesser extent Saga, that brought down the shogunate. These four states are called the Four Western Clans, or Satchotohi for short.

=== Relations with the Emperor ===
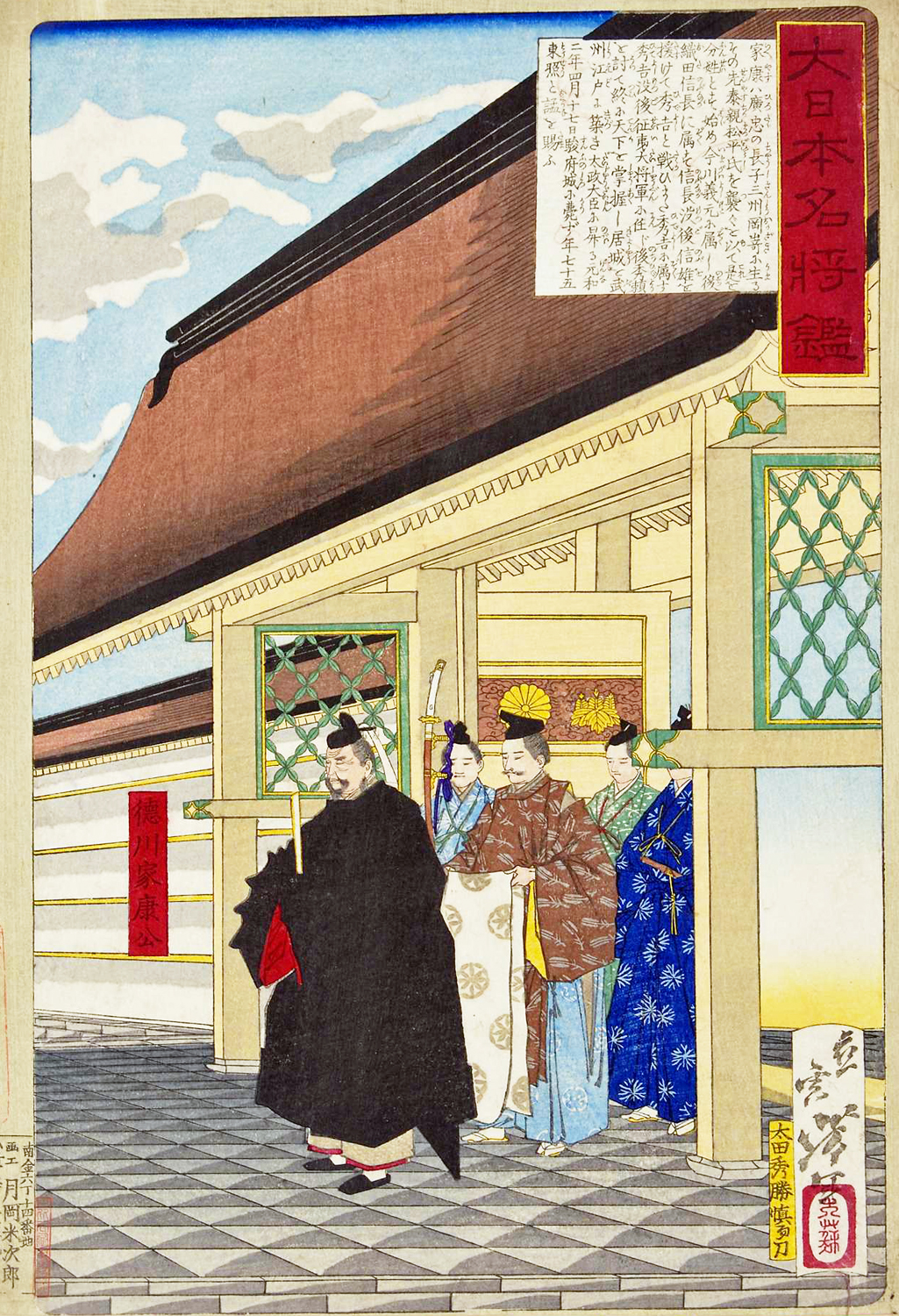
An ukiyo-e by Yoshitoshi depicting the scene when Ieyasu had an audience with Emperor Go-Yōzei

Regardless of the political title of the Emperor, the shōguns of the Tokugawa family controlled Japan. The shogunate secured a nominal grant of administration (体制, taisei) by the Imperial Court in Kyoto to the Tokugawa family. While the Emperor officially had the prerogative of appointing the shōgun and received generous subsidies, he had virtually no say in state affairs. The shogunate issued the Laws for the Imperial and Court Officials to set out its relationship with the Imperial family and the kuge (imperial court officials), and specified that the Emperor should dedicate himself to scholarship and poetry. The shogunate also appointed a liaison, the Kyoto Shoshidai (Shogun's Representative in Kyoto), to deal with the Emperor, court and nobility.

Towards the end of the shogunate, however, after centuries of the Emperor having very little say in state affairs and being secluded in his Kyoto palace, and in the wake of the reigning shōgun, Tokugawa Iemochi, marrying the sister of Emperor Kōmei (r. 1846–1867), in 1862, the Imperial Court in Kyoto began to enjoy increased political influence. The Emperor would occasionally be consulted on various policies and the shogun even made a trip to Kyoto to visit the Emperor. Government administration would be formally returned from the shōgun to the Emperor during the Meiji Restoration in 1868.

== Economy ==
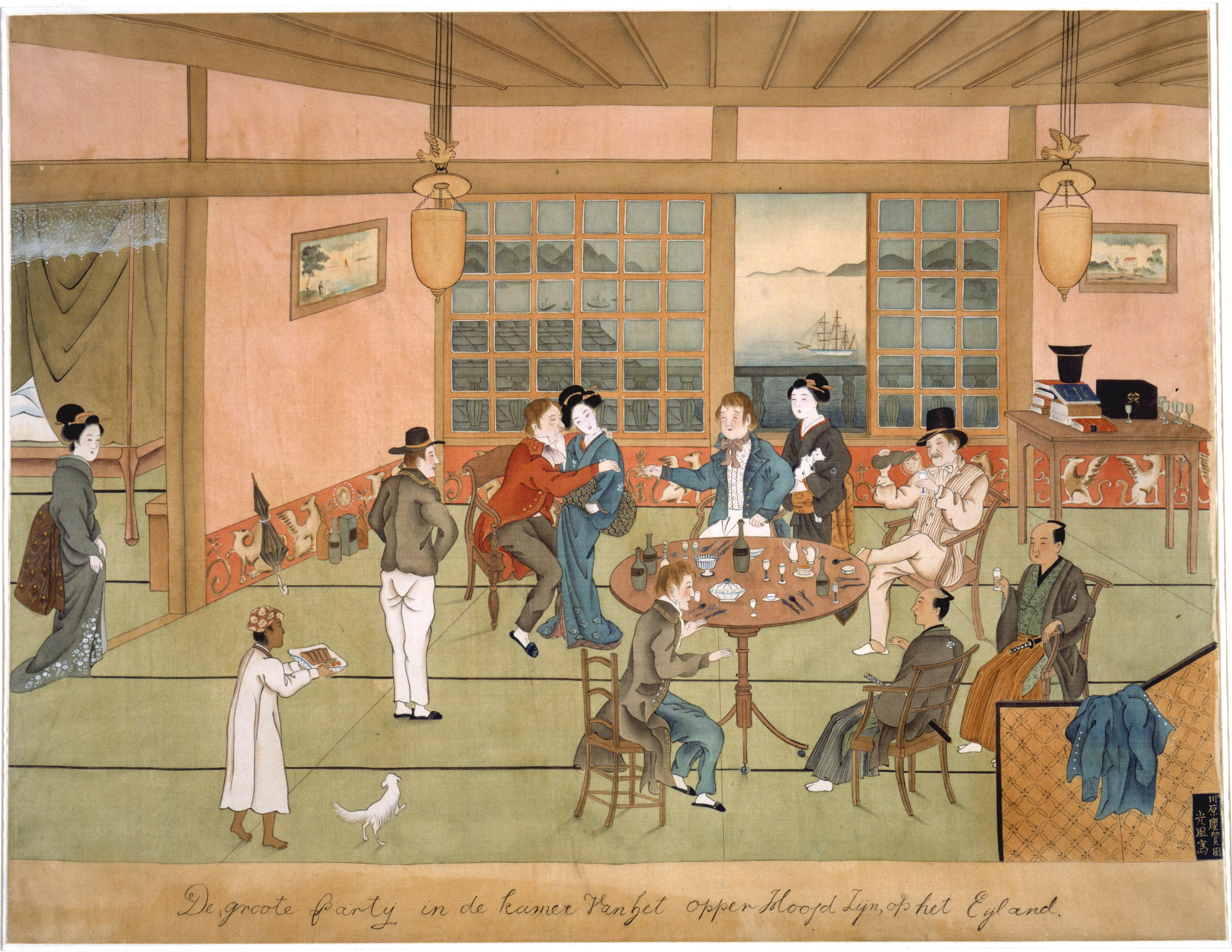
Dutch trading post in Dejima, c. 1805

After the unification of Japan, the discovery of new silver mines and the improvement of mining techniques, the extraction and export of silver from Japan increased dramatically, particularly to Ming China. Between 1560 and 1600, the annual export of silver ranged from 33 to 49 tons, but due to the Ming ban on trade with Japan, the import of Japanese silver was facilitated by the Portuguese. In the early 17th century, Japanese silver exports continued to rise, with the import of luxury goods such as silk (reaching up to 280 tons per year in the 1630s). Silk was so abundant and inexpensive in Japan that even some peasants were able to afford it, leading to a rise in its popularity among the lower classes.

In 1601, the Hokusan region became the domain of Tokugawa Ieyasu. Gold veins in Sado mine were discovered in the same year in the region, and the region served as an important source of revenue for the Shogunate throughout the Edo period. Its peak during the Edo period was the first half of the 17th century. Records indicate that over 400 kg of gold was extracted annually, and 10,000 kan (37.5 tons) of silver was paid to the Shogunate annually, Making it one of the world's largest gold mines at the time.

Foreign affairs and trade were monopolized by the shogunate, yielding an extremely large profit. Foreign trade was also permitted for the Satsuma and the Tsushima domains. Rice was the main trading product of Japan during this time. Isolationism was the foreign policy of Japan and trade was strictly controlled. Merchants were outsiders to the social hierarchy of Japan and were thought to be greedy.

The visits of the Nanban ships from Portugal were at first the main vector of trade exchanges, followed by the addition of Dutch, English, and sometimes Spanish ships.

From 1603 onward, Japan started to participate actively in foreign trade. In 1615, an embassy and trade mission under Hasekura Tsunenaga was sent across the Pacific to Nueva España (New Spain) on the Japanese-built galleon San Juan Bautista. Until 1635, the Shogun issued numerous permits for the so-called "red seal ships" destined for the Asian trade.

After 1635 and the introduction of seclusion laws (sakoku), inbound ships were only allowed from China, Korea, and the Netherlands.

The primary source of the shogunate's income was the tax (around 40%) levied on harvests in the Tokugawa clan's personal estates (tenryō). No taxes were levied on domains of daimyō, who instead provided military duty, public works and corvee. The shogunate obtained loans from merchants, which were sometimes seen as forced donations, although commerce was often not taxed. Special levies were also imposed for infrastructure-building.

== Shogunate officials ==
During the earliest years of the Tokugawa shogunate institution, when Tokugawa Hidetada was crowned as the second shogun and Ieyasu retired, they formed dual governments, where Hidetada controlled the official court with the government central located in Edo city, Ieyasu, who now became the Ōgosho (retired shogun), also controlled his own informal shadow government which called "Sunpu government" with its center at Sunpu Castle. The membership of the Sunpu government’s cabinet consisted of trusted vassals of Ieyasu who were not included in Hidetada’s cabinet, including William Adams and Jan Joosten van Lodensteijn, whom Ieyasu entrusted with foreign affairs and diplomacy.

The earliest structure of the Edo shogunate’s organization had the Buke Shitsuyaku as its highest rank; the earliest members of this office were Ii Naomasa, Sakakibara Yasumasa, and Honda Tadakatsu.

The personal vassals of the Tokugawa shoguns were classified into two groups:

- the bannermen (hatamoto) had the privilege to directly approach the shogun;
- the housemen (gokenin) did not have the privilege of the shogun's audience and also held smaller fiefs or stipends.

By the early 18th century, out of around 22,000 personal vassals, most were receiving stipends rather than holding fiefs.

=== Rōjū and wakadoshiyori ===
The rōjū were normally the most senior members of the shogunate. Normally, four or five men held the office, and one was on duty for a month at a time on a rotating basis. They supervised the ōmetsuke (inspectors, who checked on the daimyō), machi-bugyō (commissioners of administrative and judicial functions in major cities, especially Edo), ongoku bugyō (遠国奉行, the commissioners of other major cities and shogunate domains) and other officials, oversaw relations with the Imperial Court in Kyoto, kuge (members of the nobility), daimyō, Buddhist temples and Shinto shrines, and attended to matters like divisions of fiefs. Other bugyō (commissioners) in charge of finances, monasteries and shrines also reported to the rōjū. The roju conferred on especially important matters. In the administrative reforms of 1867 (Keiō Reforms), the office was eliminated in favor of a bureaucratic system with ministers for the interior, finance, foreign relations, army, and navy.

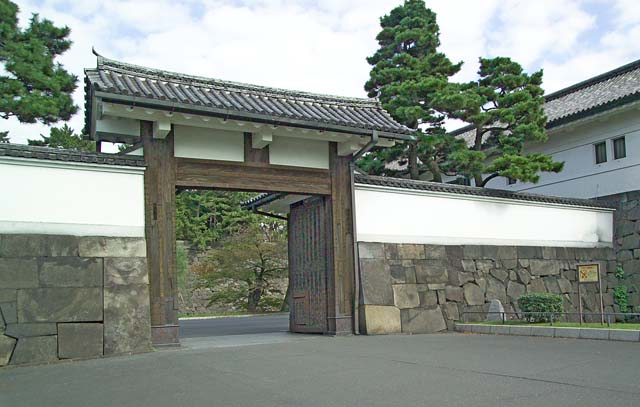
Sakuradamon Gate of Edo Castle where Ii Naosuke was assassinated in 1860

In principle, the requirements for appointment to the office of rōjū were to be a fudai daimyō and to have a domain assessed at 50000 koku or more. However, there were exceptions to both criteria. Many appointees came from the offices close to the shōgun, such as soba yōnin, Kyoto Shoshidai, and Osaka-jō dai.

Irregularly, the shōguns appointed a rōjū to the position of tairō (great elder). The office was limited to members of the Ii, Sakai, Doi, and Hotta clans, but Yanagisawa Yoshiyasu was given the status of tairō as well. Among the most famous was Ii Naosuke, who was assassinated in 1860 outside the Sakuradamon Gate of Edo Castle (Sakuradamon incident).

Three to five men titled the wakadoshiyori were next in status below the rōjū. An outgrowth of the early six-man rokuninshū (六人衆, 1633–1649), the office took its name and final form in 1662. Their primary responsibility was management of the affairs of the hatamoto and gokenin, the direct vassals of the shōgun. The wakadoshiyori also had authority over the metsuke.

Some shōguns appointed a soba yōnin (側用人). This person acted as a liaison between the shōgun and the rōjū. The soba yōnin increased in importance during the time of the fifth shōgun Tokugawa Tsunayoshi, when a wakadoshiyori, Inaba Masayasu, assassinated Hotta Masatoshi, the tairō. Fearing for his personal safety, Tsunayoshi moved the rōjū to a more distant part of the castle. Some of the most famous soba yōnin were Yanagisawa Yoshiyasu and Tanuma Okitsugu.

=== Ōmetsuke and metsuke ===
The ōmetsuke and metsuke were officials who reported to the rōjū and wakadoshiyori. The five ōmetsuke were in charge of monitoring the affairs of the daimyō, kuge and imperial court. They were in charge of discovering any threat of rebellion. Early in the Edo period, daimyō such as Yagyū Munefuyu held the office. Soon, however, it fell to hatamoto with rankings of 5,000 koku or more. To give them authority in their dealings with daimyō, they were often ranked at 10,000 koku and given the title of kami (an ancient title, typically signifying the governor of a province) such as Bizen-no-kami.

As time progressed, the function of the ōmetsuke evolved into one of passing orders from the shogunate to the daimyō, and of administering to ceremonies within Edo Castle. They also took on additional responsibilities such as supervising religious affairs and controlling firearms. The metsuke, reporting to the wakadoshiyori, oversaw the affairs of the vassals of the shōgun. They were the police force for the thousands of hatamoto and gokenin who were concentrated in Edo. Individual han had their own metsuke who similarly policed their samurai.

=== San-bugyō ===
The san-bugyō (三奉行 "three administrators") were the jisha, kanjō, and machi, which respectively oversaw temples and shrines, accounting, and the cities. The jisha-bugyō had the highest status of the three. They oversaw the administration of Buddhist temples (ji) and Shinto shrines (sha), many of which held landed estates. Also, they heard lawsuits from several land holdings outside the eight Kantō provinces. The appointments normally went to daimyō; Ōoka Tadasuke was an exception, though he later became a daimyō.

The kanjō-bugyō were next in status. The four holders of this office reported to the rōjū. They were responsible for the finances of the shogunate.

The machi-bugyō were the chief city administrators of Edo and other cities. Their roles included mayor, chief of the police (and, later, also of the fire department), and judge in criminal and civil matters not involving samurai. Two (briefly, three) men, normally hatamoto, held the office, and alternated by month.

=== Tenryō, gundai and daikan ===
The san-bugyō together sat on a council called the hyōjōsho. In this capacity, they were responsible for administering the tenryō (the shogun's estates), supervising the gundai (郡代), the daikan and the kura bugyō (蔵奉行), as well as hearing cases involving samurai. The gundai managed Tokugawa domains with incomes greater than 10,000 koku while the daikan managed areas with incomes between 5,000 and 10,000 koku.

The shogun directly held lands in various parts of Japan. These were known as shihaisho (支配所); since the Meiji period, the term tenryō (天領, literally "Emperor's land") has become synonymous, because the shogun's lands were returned to the emperor. In addition to the territory that Ieyasu held prior to the Battle of Sekigahara, this included lands he gained in that battle and lands gained as a result of the Summer and Winter Sieges of Osaka. Major cities as Nagasaki and Osaka, and mines, including the Sado gold mine, also fell into this category.

=== Gaikoku bugyō ===
The gaikoku bugyō were administrators appointed between 1858 and 1868. They were charged with overseeing trade and diplomatic relations with foreign countries, and were based in the treaty ports of Nagasaki and Kanagawa (Yokohama).

== List of Tokugawa shōgun ==
#	Picture	Name (born-died)	Shōgun from	Shōgun until
1		Tokugawa Ieyasu (1543–1616)	1603	1605
2		Tokugawa Hidetada (1579–1632)	1605	1623
3		Tokugawa Iemitsu (1604–1651)	1623	1651
4		Tokugawa Ietsuna (1641–1680)	1651	1680
5		Tokugawa Tsunayoshi (1646–1709)	1680	1709
6		Tokugawa Ienobu (1662–1712)	1709	1712
7		Tokugawa Ietsugu (1709–1716)	1713	1716
8		Tokugawa Yoshimune (1684–1751)	1716	1745
9		Tokugawa Ieshige (1712–1761)	1745	1760
10		Tokugawa Ieharu (1737–1786)	1760	1786
11		Tokugawa Ienari (1773–1841)	1787	1837
12		Tokugawa Ieyoshi (1793–1853)	1837	1853
13		Tokugawa Iesada (1824–1858)	1853	1858
14		Tokugawa Iemochi (1846–1866)	1858	1866
15		Tokugawa Yoshinobu (1837–1913)	1866	1867

=== Family Tree ===
Over the course of the Edo period, influential relatives of the shogun included:

- Tokugawa Mitsukuni of the Mito Domain
- Tokugawa Nariaki of the Mito Domain
- Tokugawa Mochiharu of the Hitotsubashi branch
- Tokugawa Munetake of the Tayasu branch.
- Matsudaira Katamori of the Aizu branch.
- Matsudaira Sadanobu, born into the Tayasu branch, adopted into the Hisamatsu-Matsudaira of Shirakawa.

== Bibliography ==
- Atwell, William (1988). "The T'ai-ch'ang, T'ien-ch'i, and Ch'ung-chen reigns, 1620–1644". In Twitchett, Denis C; Mote, Frederick W. (eds.). The Cambridge History of China Volume 7: The Ming Dynasty, 1368–1644, Part 1. Cambridge: Cambridge University Press. pp. 511–584. ISBN 0521243335.
- Atwell, William (1998). "Ming China and the emerging world economy, c. 1470–1650". In Twitchett, Denis C; Mote, Frederick W. (eds.). The Cambridge History of China 8: The Ming Dynasty, 1368 — 1644, Part II. Cambridge: Cambridge University Press. pp. 376–416. ISBN 0521243335.
- Boxer, C. R. (1948). Fidalgos in the Far East, 1550–1770. The Hague: Martinus Nijhoff.
- Boxer, C. R. (1951). The Christian Century in Japan: 1549–1650. University of California Press. GGKEY:BPN6N93KBJ7.
- Nussbaum, Louis-Frédéric (2002). Japan Encyclopedia. Harvard University Press reference library. Translated by Roth, Käthe. Cambridge, Mass.: Harvard University Press. ISBN 978-0-674-01753-5.
- Bolitho, Harold (1974). Treasures Among Men: The Fudai Daimyo in Tokugawa Japan. New Haven: Yale University Press. ISBN 978-0-300-01655-0.
- Haga, Tōru (2021). Pax Tokugawana: the cultural flowering of Japan, 1603-1853. Japan library. Translated by Carpenter, Juliet Winters (First English ed.). Tokyo: Japan Publishing Industry Foundation for Culture. ISBN 978-4-86658-148-4.
- Totman, Conrad D. (1980). The collapse of the Tokugawa bakufu, 1862-1868 (Nachdr. ed.). Honolulu: University Press of Hawaii. ISBN 978-0-8248-0614-9.
- Totman, Conrad D. (1967). Politics in the Tokugawa Bakufu, 1600-1843. Harvard University Press. ISBN 978-0-674-68800-1.
- Waswo, Ann (1996). Modern Japanese society, 1868-1994. Oxford; New York : Oxford University Press. ISBN 978-0-19-289228-7.
- Meiji Japan Through Contemporary Sources: 1844-1882. Volume Two. Centre for East Asian cultural studies, The Toyo Bunko. 1970.
- Totman, Conrad D.; Nakane, Chie; Ōishi, Shinzaburō, eds. (1990). Tokugawa Japan: the social and economic antecedents of modern Japan. Tokyo, Japan: University of Tokyo Press. pp. 24–28. ISBN 978-4-13-027024-3.
- Jansen, Marius B. (2002). The Making of Modern Japan. Harvard University Press. ISBN 978-0-674-00991-2.
- Turnbull, Stephen (2002), Samurai Invasion: Japan's Korean War 1592–98, Cassell & Co, ISBN 978-0304359486, OCLC 50289152
- Turnbull, Stephen (2010). Hatamoto. Samurai Horse and Foot Guards 1540–1724. Oxford: Osprey Publishing. ISBN 978-184603-478-7.
