= Adekunle Ojora =

Nigerian business executive (1932–2026)

- Born: 1932
- Died: 28 January 2026 (aged 93)
- Education: Regent Street Polytechnic
- Employer: Journalist-BBC Nigerian Broadcasting Corporation United African Company
- Children: Toyin Saraki
- Relatives: Bukola Saraki (Son-in-law)

Chief Adekunle Ojora (1932 – 28 January 2026) was a Nigerian business executive who was chairman of the board of AGIP Nigeria Limited from 1971 until it was acquired by Unipetrol in 2002. He began a career as a journalist with the BBC in the early 1950s, in 1962 he became an executive of UAC and in the 1970s, he began to invest in a number of foreign firms in Nigeria.

== Life and career ==
Ojora was a member of the Ojora and Adele royal families of Lagos and was himself the holder of the chieftaincy of the Otunba of Lagos. He studied journalism at Regent Street Polytechnic, with the intention of developing a career in journalism. He started work as a staffer at the BBC where he rose to become an assistant editor. In 1955, he switched his services to the Nigerian government as a reporter with the Nigerian Broadcasting Corporation. He was soon transferred to Ibadan as an information officer in the office of the regional premier. Ojora's stint with NBC lasted until 1961 when he took up appointment as the public relations manager at United African Company. Ojora soon developed interest in the commercial units of enterprises, he became an executive director of UAC in 1962. After a military coup truncated the first republic, Ojora was nominated as a member of Lagos City Council in 1966. A year later, he was given political appointments in two government agencies, in 1967, he was managing director of WEMABOD, a regional property and investment company and also in 1967, he succeeded Kola Balogun as chairman of Nigerian National Shipping Line.

After leaving WEMABOD, he became an investor in various firms including AGIP petroleum marketing and NCR Nigeria. He also founded the private firms Nigerlink Industries, Unital Builders and a holding company Lagos Investments. After the Nigerian Enterprise Promotion Act, he took equity interest in some foreign companies operating in such as investments in the Nigerian operations of Bowring Group, Inchape, Schlumberger, Phoenix Assurance, UTC Nigeria, Evans Brothers and Seven-Up. He was married to Erelu Ojuolape and their daughter was Toyin Saraki.

Ojora died on 28 January 2026, at the age of 93.
