= Keiō =

Period of Japanese history (1865–1868)

Keiō era 慶応
- 1 May 1865 – October 23, 1868
Genji	Meiji
- Emperor Kōmei (posthumous portrait, 1902)
- Location: Japan
- Including: Keiō Reforms; Battle of Toba–Fushimi; Battle of Aizu
- Monarch: Kōmei

Keiō (慶応; historically 慶應) was a Japanese era name (年号, nengō; literally "year name") after Genji and before Meiji. The period spanned the years from May 1865 to October 1868. The reigning emperors were Kōmei-tennō (孝明天皇) and Meiji-tennō (明治天皇).

== Change of era ==
- May 1, 1865 (Genji 2/Keiō 1, 7th day of the 4th month) Keiō gannen (慶応元年): The new era name of Keiō (meaning "Jubilant Answer") was created to mark the Kinmon Incident. The previous era ended and a new one commenced in Genji 2.

== Events of the Keiō era ==
- 1866 (Keiō 2): Goryōkaku completed
- August 29, 1866 (Keiō 2, 20th day of the 7th month): Shōgun Iemochi died at Osaka; and the bakufu petitioned that Hitotsubashi Yoshinobu should be appointed as his successor.
- January 10, 1867 (Keiō 2, 5th day of the 12th month): Yoshinobu was appointed shōgun.
- January 30, 1867 (Keiō 2, 25th day of the 12th month): Emperor Komei died.
- February 13, 1867 (Keiō 3, 9th day of the 1st month): Mutsuhito ascended to the throne as Emperor Meiji.
- November 10, 1867 (Keiō 3, 15th day of the 10th month): An Imperial edict was issued sanctioning the restoration of Imperial government.
- January 6, 1868 (Keiō 3, 10th day of the 12th month): The restoration of the Imperial government was announced to the kuge. The year 1868 began as Keio 3, and did not become Meiji 1 until the 8th day of the 9th month of Keio 4, i.e., October 23; although retrospectively, it was quoted as the first year of the new era from 25 January onwards.
- January 27, 1868 (Keiō 4, 3rd of the 1st month): The Boshin War begins with the Battle of Toba–Fushimi.
- September 3, 1868 (Keiō 4, 17th day of the 7th month): Edo was renamed "Tokyo", i.e. meaning "Eastern Capital".
- October 8, 1868 (Keiō 4, 23rd of the 8th month): Battle of Aizu begins.
- October 12, 1868 (Keiō 4, 27th day of the 8th month): Emperor Meiji is crowned in the Shishin-den in Kyoto.
- October 23, 1868 (Keiō 4/Meiji 1, 8th day of the 9th month): The nengō is formally changed from Keiō to Meiji; and a general amnesty is granted. The adoption of the Meiji nengō was done retroactively to January 25, 1868 (Keiō 4/Meiji 1, 1st day of the 1st month).

== Keio University ==
Keio University, which was initially established in 1858 (Ansei 5), seven years before the beginning of the Keiō era, is named after this era. This is the oldest existing institution of higher learning in Japan.

== See also ==
- Keiō Reforms

== Notes ==
Preceded by Genji (元治)	Era of Japan; Keiō (慶応); 1 May 1865 – 22 October 1868	Succeeded by Meiji (明治)
