= Genji era =

Period of Japanese history (1864–1865)

Genji (元治) is a Japanese era name (年号, nengō; lit. "year name") after Bunkyū and before Keiō. This period spanned only slightly more than a single year from March 27, 1864 until May 1, 1865. The reigning emperor was Kōmei-tennō (孝明天皇).

The new era name was derived from the I Ching.

== Change of era ==
- March 27, 1864 (Bunkyū 4/Genji 1, 20th day of the 2nd month) Genji gannen (元治元年): The new era name of Genji (meaning "original rule") was created to mark the beginning of a new 60-year cycle of the Chinese zodiac. The old era ended and a new one commenced in Bunkyū 4.

== Events ==
- July 8, 1864 (Genji 1, fifth day of the sixth month): The Ikedaya Jiken, also known as the Ikedaya Affair or Ikedaya Incident, developed at the Ikedaya ryokan in Kyoto.
- August 12, 1864 (Genji 1, 11th day of the 7th month): Sakuma Shōzan is assassinated at age 53. He had traveled from Edo to Kyoto on orders of the shogunate. He was in favor of steps which would lead to an opening of the country, but his voice was stilled by death at the hands of a sonno joi supporter.
- September 5–6, 1864 (Genji 1, 5th–6th day of the eighth month): Bombardment of Shimonoseki

== See also ==
- Genji Kaku
- Genji clan
- Genji Monogatari
- Genji Tsuushin Agedama
- Genji Monogatari Sennenki

== Notes ==
Preceded by Bunkyū (文久)	Era or nengō Genji (元治); 27 March 1864 – 30 April 1865	Succeeded by Keiō (慶応)
