= Emperor Kōmei =

Emperor of Japan from 1846 to 1867

- Posthumous portrait by Koyama Shōtarō, 1902

Emperor of Japan
- Reign: 10 March 1846 – 30 January 1867
- Enthronement: 31 October 1847
- Predecessor: Ninkō
- Successor: Meiji
- Shōguns: See list: Tokugawa Ieyoshi; Tokugawa Iesada; Tokugawa Iemochi; Tokugawa Yoshinobu
- Born: Osahito, Prince Hiro (煕宮統仁親王); 22 July 1831; Ōgimachi Family's mansion (正親町邸), Kyoto, Tokugawa shogunate
- Died: 30 January 1867 (aged 35); Otsunegoten (御常御殿), Kyoto Imperial Palace, Kyoto, Tokugawa shogunate
- Burial: Nochi no tsuki no wa no misasagi (後月輪東山陵), Kyoto
- Spouse: Asako Kujō
- Issue: Emperor Meiji; (among others)
Posthumous name
- Chinese-style shigō: Emperor Kōmei (孝明天皇)
- House: Imperial House of Japan
- Father: Emperor Ninkō
- Mother: Naoko Ōgimachi
- Religion: Shinto

Emperor Kōmei (孝明天皇, Kōmei-tennō; 22 July 1831 – 30 January 1867), personal name Osahito, was the 121st emperor of Japan, according to the traditional order of succession. Kōmei's reign spanned the years from 1846 through 1867, corresponding to the final years of the Edo period.

During his reign there was much internal turmoil as a result of Japan's first major contact with the United States, which occurred under Matthew C. Perry in 1853 and 1854, and the subsequent forced re-opening of Japan to Western nations, ending a 220-year period of national seclusion. Emperor Kōmei did not care much for anything foreign, and he opposed opening Japan to Western powers. His reign would continue to be dominated by insurrection and partisan conflicts, eventually culminating shortly after his death in the collapse of the Tokugawa shogunate and the Meiji Restoration in the beginning of the reign of his son and successor Emperor Meiji.

== Early life ==
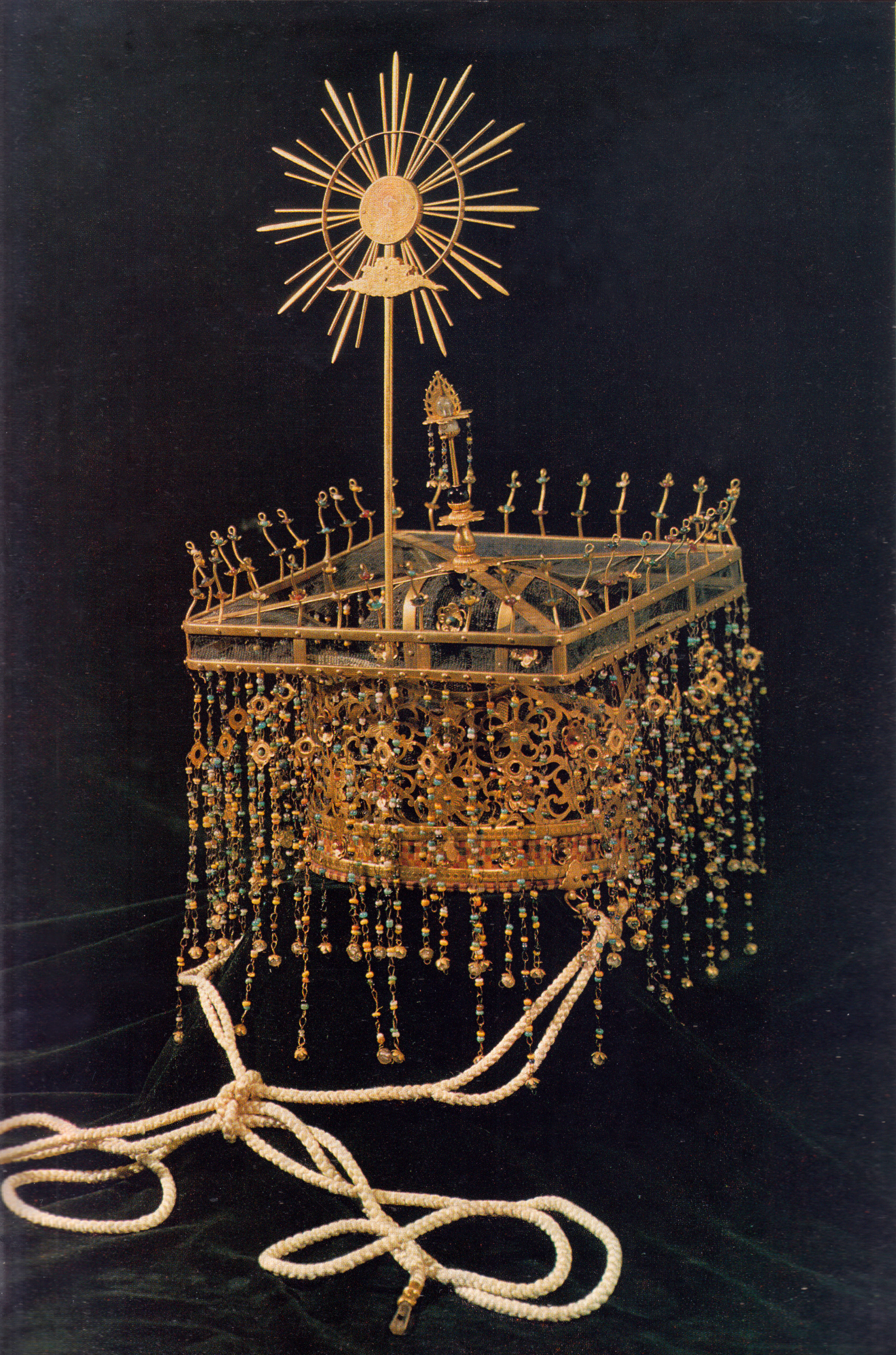
The Imperial crown of Japanese Emperor Kōmei

Before Kōmei's accession to the Chrysanthemum Throne, his personal name (imina) was Osahito (統仁) and his title was Hiro-no-miya (煕宮). Osahito was born on 22 July 1831 and was the fourth son of Emperor Ninkō and his consort Ōgimachi Naoko (正親町雅子). Osahito's Imperial Family lived with him in the Kyoto Imperial Palace.

== Reign ==
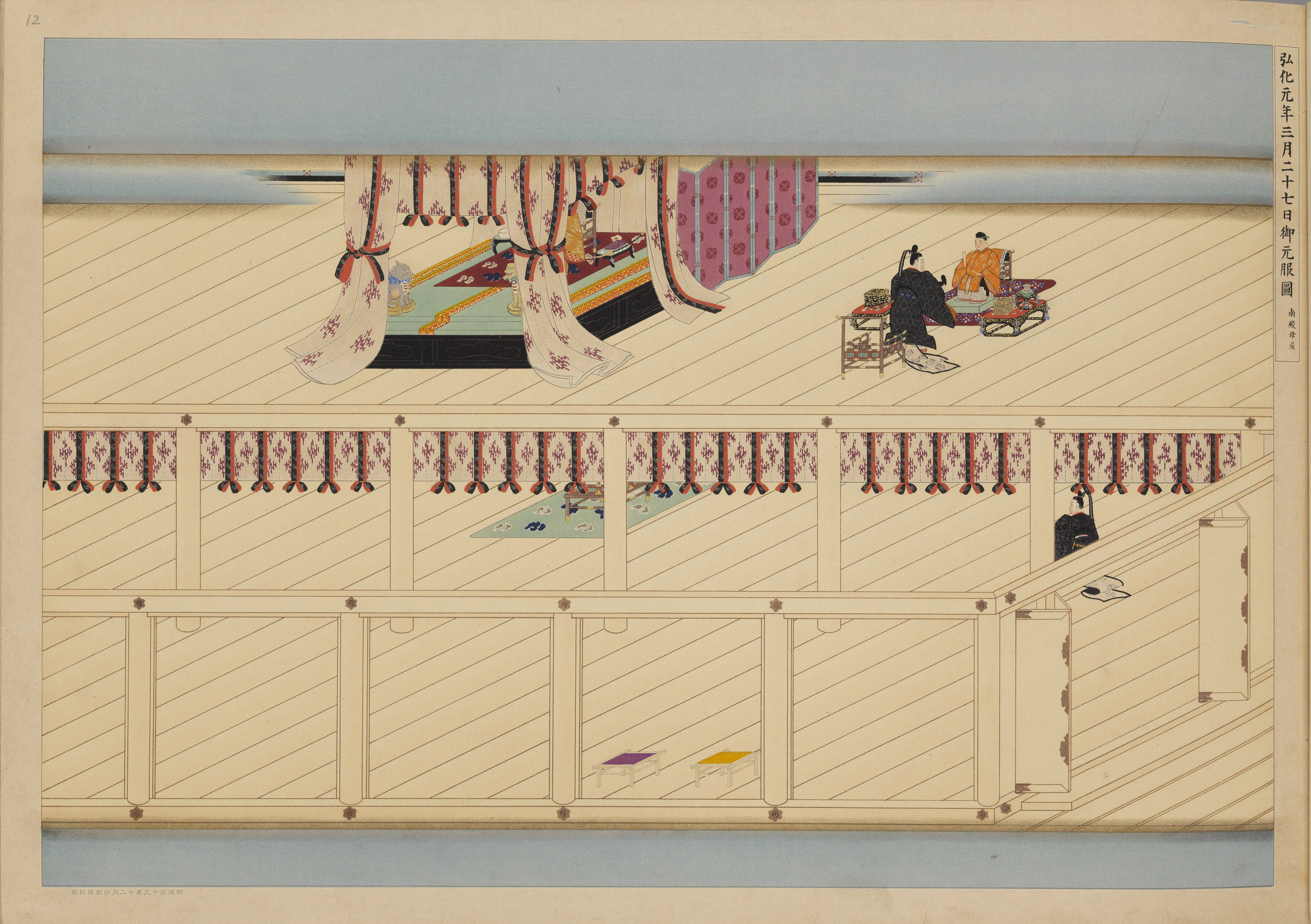
Genpuku (元服) ceremony of crown prince Osahito (right) at the Shishinden, Emperor Ninkō on throne (left) in 1st year of Kōka (1845).

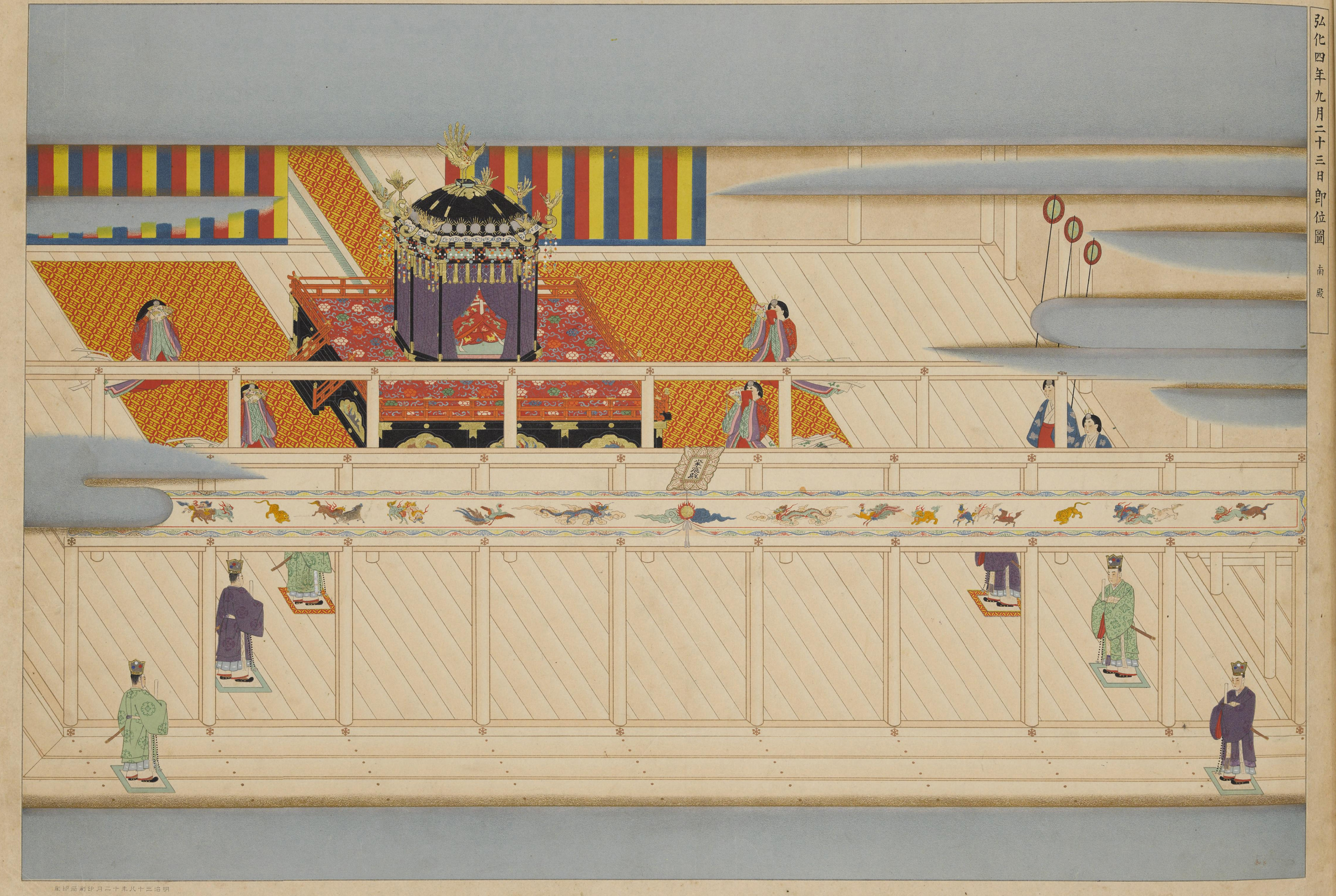
Enthronement ceremony of Emperor Kōmei at the Shishinden.

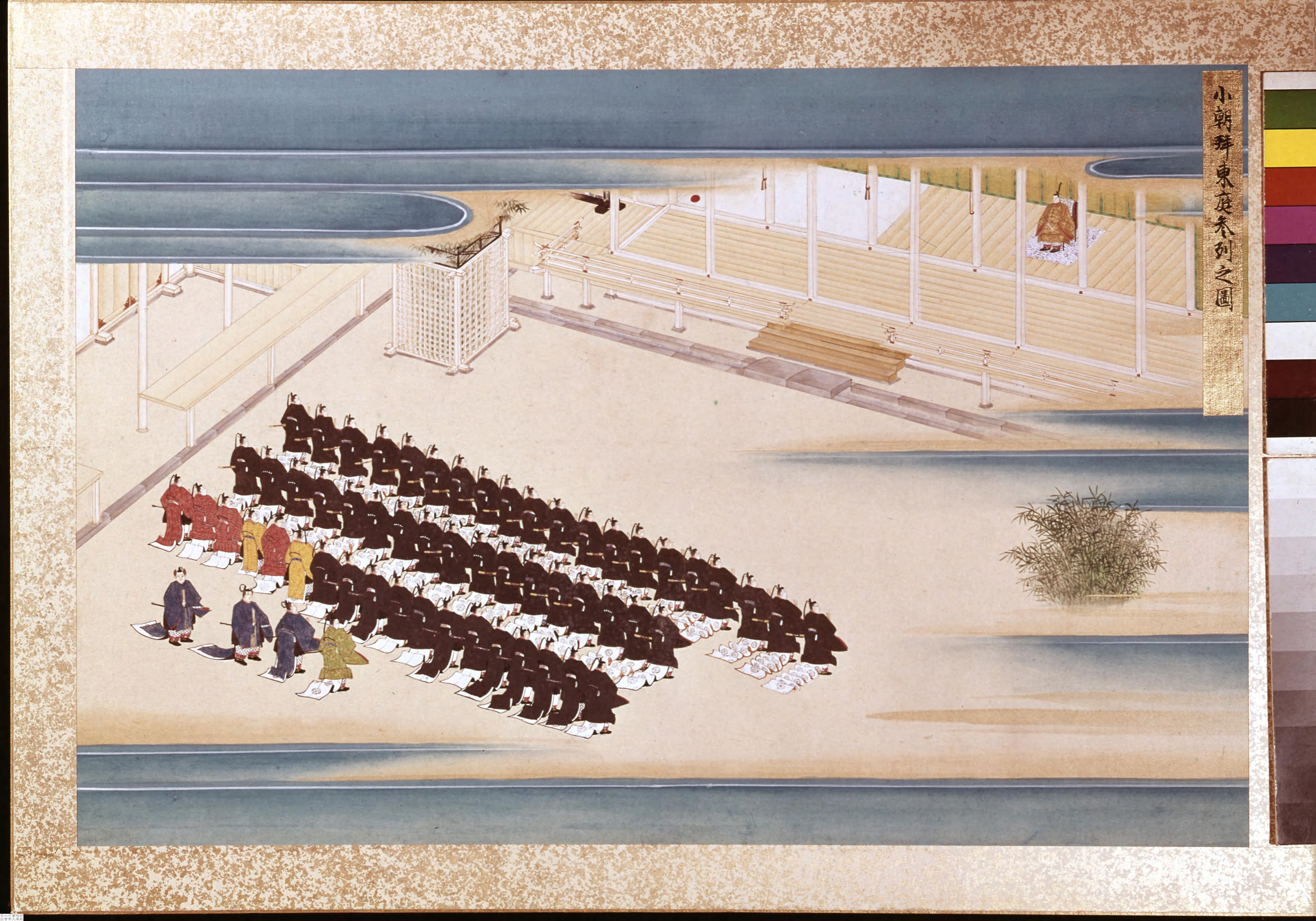
Emperor Komei receives court officials at the Seiryōden.

Prince Osahito was enthroned as Emperor on 10 March 1846 upon the death of his father. The succession was considered to have been received by the new monarch; and shortly thereafter, Emperor Kōmei is said to have acceded the throne. The years of Kōmei's reign correspond with a period in which Tokugawa Ieyoshi, Tokugawa Iesada, Tokugawa Iemochi, and Tokugawa Yoshinobu were leaders at the pinnacle of the Tokugawa shogunate. On 8 July 1853 US Commodore Matthew Perry arrived with his "Black Ships" to force trade with Japan. The Tokugawa shogunate, which had controlled military and civil affairs in Japan's feudal provinces for some three centuries, proved unable to meet the new challenge of open trade with the West. At the time, Emperor Kōmei still retained only symbolic power at his court in Kyoto. As the shogunate, divided by internal disputes, gradually surrendered sovereignty to the foreign powers under threat of military force, Emperor Kōmei began to assert himself and regain many of the powers his ancestors had conceded to the Tokugawa clan at the close of the Sengoku ("warring states") period. The Emperor's younger sister, Imperial princess Kazu-no-Miya Chikako (和宮親子内親王), was married to the Tokugawa shōgun Tokugawa Iemochi as part of the Movement to Unite Court and Bakufu. Both the Emperor and his sister were against the marriage, even though he realized the gains to be had from such familial connections with the true ruler of Japan. Emperor Kōmei did not care much for anything foreign, and he opposed opening Japan to Western powers, even as the shogun continued to accept foreign demands.

=== Consultation with the shogunate ===
On 22 January 1858, Daigaku-no-kami Hayashi Akira headed the bakufu delegation which sought advice from Emperor Kōmei in deciding how to deal with newly assertive foreign powers. This would have been the first time the Emperor's counsel was actively sought since the establishment of the Tokugawa shogunate. The most easily identified consequence of this transitional overture would be the increased numbers of messengers streaming back and forth between Edo and Kyoto during the next decade. Concerning these difficult Imperial audiences in Kyoto, it is somewhat remarkable that the shogun and his bakufu were represented by Hayashi Akira, a 19th-century neo-Confucian scholar/bureaucrat who might have been somewhat surprised to find himself at a crucial nexus of managing political change—moving arguably "by the book" through uncharted waters with well-settled theories and history as the only reliable guide. Hayashi Akira was dispatched from Edo to Kyoto in October 1858 to explain the terms of the Treaty of Amity and Commerce (日米修好通商条約, Nichibei Shūkō Tsūshō Jōyaku), also known as the Harris Treaty. Hayashi's twofold task was to both explain the terms to a sceptical Emperor and gain the sovereign's assent to it. Kōmei did ultimately acquiesce in February 1859 when he came to understand that there was no alternative.

The pilgrimage of the 14th shogun Tokugawa Iemochi to Kyoto in 1863 was a defining moment not only in 19th century relations between the military bakufu and the Imperial Court, but also in what history would come to call the Meiji Restoration. The reception by Emperor Kōmei of the shogun in the Kyoto palace can be seen as a moment at which the political realm was thoroughly redefined, becoming a transitional imperial realm. This impression was enforced by the ensuing pilgrimage by Emperor Kōmei to the Kamo shrine, with the shogun in tow. This public demonstration showed that a new order had now emerged in the realm.

After reluctantly accepting the Harris Treaty, Japan quickly signed similar treaties, called the Ansei Treaties (also known as the Ansei Five-Power Treaties, with Russia, France, Great Britain, and the Netherlands). The treaties stipulated that the citizens of those foreign nations would be allowed to reside and trade at will in the cities of Edo, Nagasaki, Niigata, Kobe and Yokohama. Those five cities were to be opened to foreign trade with the four Western nations in the treaties. In addition, the treaties stipulated that a system of extraterritoriality would provide for the subjugation of foreign residents to the laws of their own consular courts instead of the Japanese legal system.

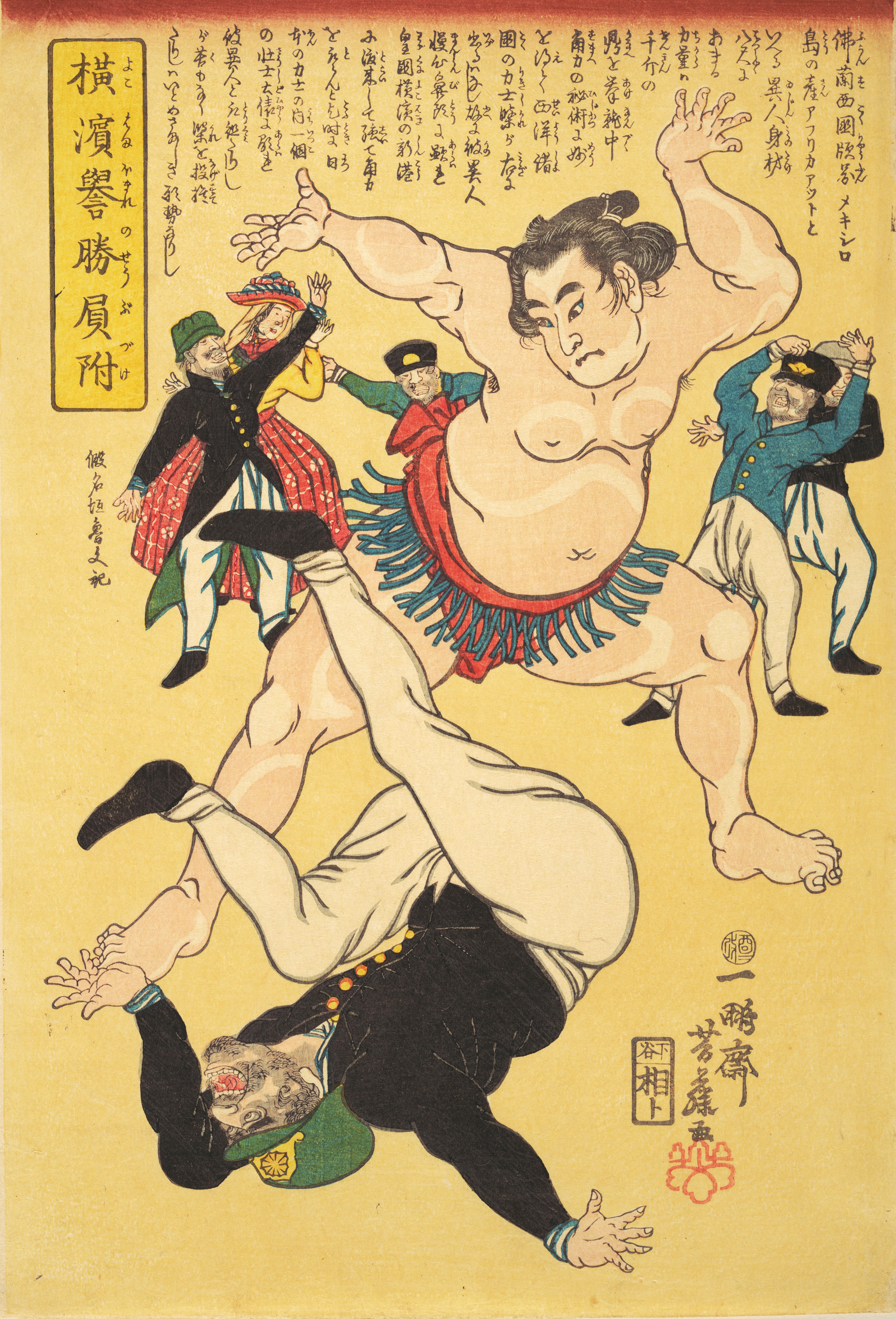
An 1861 image expressing the Joi (攘夷; "Expel the Barbarians") sentiment

=== The "Order to Expel Barbarians" ===
Emperor Kōmei was infuriated with nearly every development during his reign as Emperor, and during his lifetime he never saw any foreigners nor did he know much about them. Unequal trade treaties with the Western powers, such as the Treaty of Kanagawa and the Harris Treaty were signed without Imperial sanction and in spite of the Emperor's refusal to approve them. He twice expressed his will to abdicate in protest. During his reign he started to gain more power as the Tokugawa shogunate declined, though this was limited to consultation and other forms of deference according to protocol. Emperor Kōmei generally agreed with anti-Western sentiments, and, breaking with centuries of imperial tradition, began to take an active role in matters of state. As opportunities arose, he fulminated against the treaties and attempted to interfere in the shogunal succession. His efforts culminated in 1863 with his "Order to expel barbarians". Although the Shogunate had no intention of enforcing the order, it nevertheless inspired attacks against the Shogunate itself and against foreigners in Japan: the most famous incident was the killing of British trader Charles Lennox Richardson, for which the Tokugawa government paid an indemnity of 100,000 pound sterling. Other incidents included the bombardments of Shimonoseki and Kagoshima, and the destruction of Japanese warships, coastal guns, and assorted military infrastructure throughout the country. These incidents showed that Japan could not match the military might of the Western powers at the time, and that military confrontation could not yet be a valid solution.

=== Illness and death ===
In January 1867, the Emperor was diagnosed with smallpox, which caused surprise because Kōmei had allegedly never been ill before. On 30 January 1867, he suffered a fatal violent bout of vomiting and diarrhea, and had purple spots on his face. Emperor Kōmei's death was distinctly convenient for the anti-bakufu forces whom Kōmei had consistently opposed. It was rumored at the time that he was assassinated either by radicals from Choshu, or radical officials in the court. British diplomat Sir Ernest Satow wrote, "it is impossible to deny that [the Emperor Kōmei's] disappearance from the political scene, leaving as his successor a boy of fifteen or sixteen [actually fourteen], was most opportune". However, there is no evidence of this and it is generally believed that he was simply one more victim of what was a worldwide pandemic at the time. Nevertheless, by the time of Emperor Kōmei's death the government was faced with bankruptcy and near collapse. Japan was also surrounded by colonial powers, who stood poised to gain considerable influence with substantial investments in Japanese trade. Kōmei's son, Imperial Prince Mutsuhito, was crowned as Emperor Meiji on 12 September 1868 and these issues were put to rest under the Meiji Restoration.

After Kōmei's death in 1867, his kami was enshrined in the Imperial mausoleum, Nochi no Tsukinowa no Higashi no misasagi (後月輪東山陵), which is at Sennyū-ji in Higashiyama-ku, Kyoto. Also enshrined in this mausoleum complex are Kōmei's immediate predecessors since Emperor Go-Mizunoo: Meishō, Go-Kōmyō, Go-Sai, Reigen, Higashiyama, Nakamikado, Sakuramachi, Momozono, Go-Sakuramachi, Go-Momozono, Kōkaku and Ninkō. Empress Dowager Eishō is also entombed at this Imperial mausoleum complex.

Emperor Kōmei was the last Emperor to be given a posthumous name chosen after his death. Beginning with the reign of his son, Emperor Meiji, posthumous names were chosen in advance, being the same as their reign names.

== Kugyō ==
Kugyō (公卿) is a collective term for the very few most powerful men attached to the court of the Emperor of Japan in pre-Meiji eras. Even during those years in which the court's actual influence outside the palace walls was minimal, the hierarchic organization persisted.

In general, this elite group included only three to four men at a time. These were hereditary courtiers whose experience and background would have brought them to the pinnacle of a life's career. During Kōmei's reign, this apex of the Daijō-kan included:

- Kampaku, Takatsukasa Masamichi, 1823–1856
- Kampaku, Kujō Hisatada, 1856–1862
- Kampaku, Konoe Tadahiro, 1862–1863
- Kampaku, Takatsukasa Sukehiro, 1863
- Kampaku, Nijō Nariyuki, 1863–1866
- Sadaijin
- Udaijin
- Naidaijin
- Dainagon

== Eras of Kōmei's reign ==
Imperial Seal of Japan — a stylized chrysanthemum blossom

Emperor Kōmei was the last Japanese Emperor who had more than one era name (nengō) during a single ruling term. Beginning with his successor, Emperor Meiji, a single era name (identical to the Emperor's eventual posthumous name) was selected and did not change until his death. There were seven nengō during Kōmei's reign.

- Kōka (1844–1848)
- Kaei (1848–1854)
- Ansei (1854–1860)
- Man'en (1860–1861)
- Bunkyū (1861–1864)
- Genji (1864–1865)
- Keiō (1865–1868)

== Genealogy ==
The family included six children, four daughters and two sons; but the future Emperor Meiji was the only one to survive to adulthood. Kōmei's principal consort was Asako Kujō (九条夙子). After Kōmei's death in 1867, Asako was given the title Empress Dowager Eishō (英照皇太后) by Emperor Meiji.

=== Spouse ===
Position	Name	Birth	Death	Father	Issue
Nyōgo	Asako Kujō (九条夙子) later Empress Dowager Eishō (英照皇太后)	1835	1897	Kujō Hisatada	• First Daughter: Imperial Princess Yoriko • Second daughter: Princess Fuki • Adopted Son: Imperial Prince Mutsuhito (later Emperor Meiji)

=== Concubines ===
Name	Birth	Death	Father	Issue
Bojo Nobuko (坊城伸子)	1830	1850	Unknown	• First Son: Myōkōgein
Nakayama Yoshiko (中山慶子)	1836	1907	Nakayama Tadayasu	• Second Son: Imperial Prince Mutsuhito (later Emperor Meiji)
Horikawa Kiko (堀河紀子)	1837	1910	Unknown	• Third Daughter: Princess Suma • Fourth Daughter: Princess Rie
Imaki Shigeko (今城重子)	1828	1901	Unknown	None
Imaki Naoko (今城尚子)	Unknown	Unknown	Unknown	None

=== Issue ===
Status	Name	Birth	Death	Mother	Marriage	Issue
First Son	Prince Myōkōgein (妙香華院)	1849	1850	Bojo Nobuko	—N/a	—N/a
First Daughter	Imperial Princess Yoriko (順子内親王)	1850	1852	Kujō Asako	—N/a	—N/a
Second Son	Imperial Prince Mutsuhito (睦仁親王) (later Emperor Meiji)	1852	1912	Nakayama Yoshiko (Birth); Asako Kujō (Adopted)	Masako Ichijō	• Emperor Taishō • Princess Masako Takeda • Fusako Kitashirakawa • Nobuko Asaka • Toshiko Higashikuni • among others...
Second Daughter	Princess Fuki (富貴宮)	1858	1859	Kujō Asako	—N/a	—N/a
Third Daughter	Princess Suma (寿万宮)	1859	1861	Horikawa Kiko	—N/a	—N/a
Fourth Daughter	Princess Rie (理宮)	1861	1862	Horikawa Kiko	—N/a	—N/a

== See also ==
- Emperor of Japan
- List of Emperors of Japan
- Imperial cult
- Heian Shrine
- Tsuki no wa no misasagi

Emperor Kōmei Imperial House of Japan Born: 22 July 1831 Died: 30 January 1867
Regnal titles
Preceded by Emperor Ninkō	Emperor of Japan; 10 March 1846 – 30 January 1867	Succeeded by Emperor Meiji
