= Kimotsuki Kanetake =

Samurai

- 肝付兼武
- Born: 1823
- Died: 1888 (aged 64–65)
- Occupations: Retainer and scholar
- Years active: Edo period
- Known for: Scholar for the Shimazu clan
- Children: Kimotsuki Kaneyuki
- Parent: Kanekiyo
- Relatives: Kanekata

Academic background
- Academic advisors: Ohashi Tostuan and Fujimori Kouan

Academic work
- Discipline: Astronomy
- Sub-discipline: Military science and Confucianism

Kimotsuki Kanetake (肝付兼武) (1823–1888) was a retainer and scholar for the Shimazu clan of southern Kyushu during the late Edo period.

== Early life ==
Kanetake was born the son of Kanekiyo, who hailed from Kushikino, Hioki district in Satsuma Province. Kanetake's great-grandfather Kanekata formed a branch family from his main one and lived in Jokamachi as a stipended lower-ranked retainer. Kanekata died during the Tenmei era (1781). Kanetake's grandfather Kaneoki died in 1811 and when Kanetake was born (1823), Kanekiyo his father was still a low stipended bushi living in a modest house below Kagoshima Castle. Also, according to the biography (see below) he became a relative of the famous Kirino Toshiaki, a Brigadier in the Imperial Army that took Aizuwakamatsu Castle from Matsudaira Katamori in 1868 in the Battle of Aizu. Kirano later died with Saigō Takamori in the 1877 Satsuma Rebellion.

== Career ==
Kanetake was the Satsuma han's astronomer and through his treatises he came to the notice of Shimazu Narioki and Nariakira. At the age of 26 in 1849, he journeyed to Edo to study military science and Confucianism under Ohashi Tostuan and Fujimori Kouan at their academy. Later he journeyed to the Tōhoku region in 1850 and when he returned to Edo, he became acquainted with Yoshida Shōin, who was very interested to hear from Kanetake the conditions of the north. Yoshida, accordingly armed with this knowledge, deceived Kanetake, and Kanetake thinking he would go back to the Tohoku with Yoshida, Yoshida, on December 14, 1850, left without telling Kanetake. The next day, Yoshida's associates, Toriyama, Miyabe, and Ebata, left for Tohoku as well. Kanetake was furious and allegedly thrashed about with his sword inside Sengaku-ji, but probably did not hurt anyone. Later he heard that Yoshida never made it over the strait to Ezo and never spoke to Yoshida again. He was friendly with Saito Shintaro of the Chōshū han who was renowned as a great swordsman.

Around 1869–70, Kanetake worked in the Resource Office of Hokkaido and later helped open the Teacher's College in Yamagata. He retired in May 1888 and died on 23 December 1888 at age 65.

== Commentary ==
According to the sayagaki on Kanetake's sword, Tanobe Michihiro Sensei states that "Kanetake was a senior retainer of the Shimazu family" and was duly a trusted retainer during the three reigns of Shimazu Nariakira, the regent Shimazu Hisamitsu, and for the 29th and final lord, Shimazu Tadayoshi (2nd).

Kanetake's journal Tohoku Fudan describes his residence of Sakurajima, Kagoshima and gives a detailed account of his travels through Ezo, Matsumae, Tsugaru, Sendai, Nihonmatsu, Sadoshima, Kaga and thence back to Kagoshima. Given the time period (1854), it is not surprising that Nariakira wished for a detailed report on the defense and social conditions in the northern domains and so sent Kanetake to gather a meaningful report.

== Destinations ==
Here is a list of where Kanetake visited:

1. Ezo Matsumae
2. Tsugaru
3. Nanbu
4. Date, Sendai
5. Nihonmatsu, Niwa
6. Aizu-Matsudaira
7. Sakura, Awa
8. Izu
9. Satake-shi
10. Sakai-shi, Tsuruoka
11. Uesugi, Yonezawa
12. Sado
13. Echigo
14. Kaga-Maeda
15. Echizen-Fukui, Matsudaira

== Legacy ==
Kanetake had a son, Kimotsuki Kaneyuki 肝付兼行 (1853–1922) later Vice Admiral, and later elevated to the peerage as Baron Kimotsuki in 1907. He was principal of the Naval Academy in 1904-05 and later served a term as Mayor of Osaka.

A sayagaki has been affixed by the well-known sword scholar, Tanobe Michihiro, which attests to the authenticity of the sword and the credentials of Kimotsuki Kanetake. By coincidence, Tanobe Michihiro was born in Kimotsuki district (now Aira-gun), from which the Kimotsuki family took its name, and is well versed in the Kimotsuki family history as his family in former times served the Shimazu family, up until the Restoration.

== Background ==
The Kimotsuki family of Ōsumi Province were an ancient family descended from Prince Ōtomo, the favourite son of Emperor Tenji who later succeeded his father as Emperor Kōbun and they are first mentioned in the early Heian period. They were the leading family of Osumi Province and clashed off and on with their neighbours the Shimazu family despite being closely related through intermarriage with them for several hundreds of years. Finally in 1566, Lord Kimotsuki Kanetsugu died after his defeat by the Shimazu. In January 1581, due to internal opposition from retainers and his mother, who was the eldest sister of Shimazu Takahisa, his third son, Kimotsuki Kaneaki surrendered the Kimotsuki lands and for the first time in over 500 years lost their independence and became senior retainers and councilors for the Shimazu family. Because of their seniority and long residence in Osumi; they were older than the Shimazu by 200 years. The founder of the Shimazu family was the offspring of Minamoto no Yoritomo and the daughter of Hiki Yoshikazu; they retained a certain degree of independence despite being once a leading family against the Shimazu. Indeed, a valiant descendant, one Kimotsuki Kanemori 19th head, fell at Sekigahara in 1600.

In recognition of their valiant service to the Shimazu, a cadet branch of the Kimotsuki, were granted a small fief in Satsuma Province. They became known as Kiire Kimotsuki, and were granted 5500 koku by the Shimazu lord. This was unique as this were one of the seven vassal family amongst the chief retainers of the Shimazu that was allowed this degree of autonomy within the Shimazu fief of 770,000 koku.

== Bibliography ==
- Kimotsuki Kanetake Den, Hirose Yutaka, Kagoshima 1932
- Nihonto Koza, Shinshinto hen, Tokyo 1967
- Nippon Kazoku Jiten, Tokyo 1975
- Satsuma to, Naminohira, Kagoshima 2009
