= Secret imperial rescript to overthrow the shogunate =

1867 Japanese court document

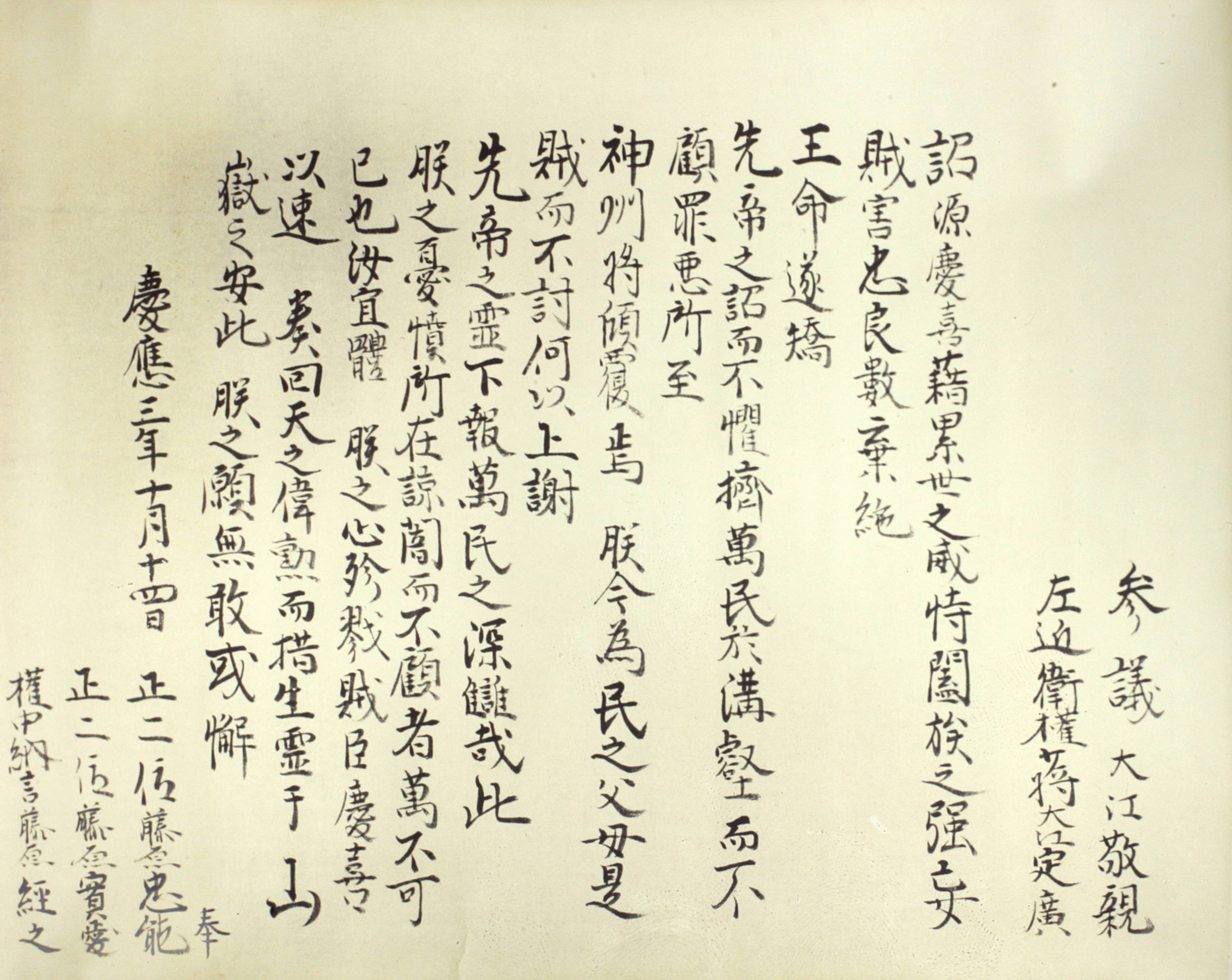
Photographic replica of the rescript issued on 9 November 1867 to Mōri Takachika and his son; the original is kept at the Mōri Museum

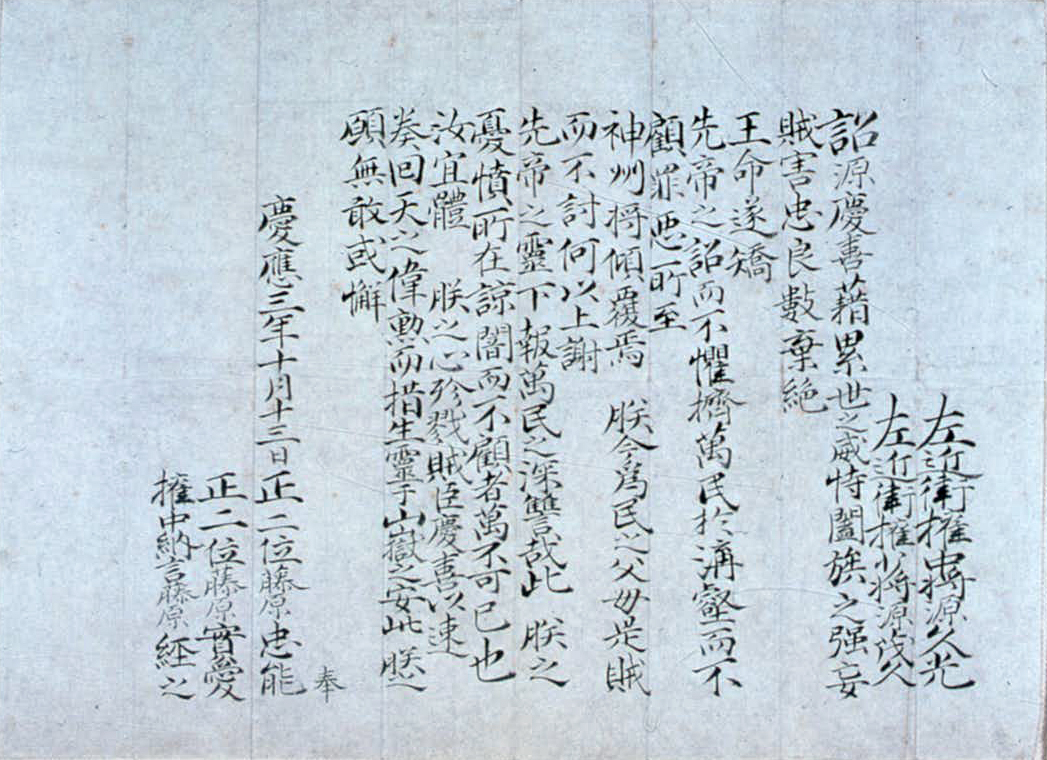
Rescript issued on 8 November 1867 to Shimazu Hisamitsu and his son; the original is kept at the Reimeikan, Kagoshima Prefectural Center for Historical Material

The secret imperial rescript to overthrow the shogunate (討幕の密勅, tōbaku no mitchoku) was a Japanese court document issued to the daimyō of the Satsuma and Chōshū Domains in November 1867 in the build-up to the Meiji Restoration of January 1868. (Note: 左近衞權中將源久光 左近衛権少將源茂久 詔源慶喜藉累世之威恃闔族之强妄賊害忠良数棄絕王命遂矯先帝之詔而不懼擠萬民於溝壑而不顧罪惡所至神州將傾覆焉朕今為民之父母是賊而不討何以上謝先帝之靈下報萬民之深讐哉此朕之憂憤所在諒闇而不顧者萬不可已也汝宜體朕之心殄戮賊臣慶喜以速奏囘天之偉勲而措生靈于山嶽之安此朕之願無敢或懈 慶應三年十月十三日 正二位 藤原忠能 正二位 藤原実愛 権中納言 藤原經之) (Note: Minamoto Hisamitsu, Provisional Middle Captain of the Left Division of Inner Palace Guards Minamoto Tadayoshi, Provisional Minor Captain of the Left Division of Inner Palace Guards By imperial decree: Minamoto Yoshinobu, relying on the inherited power and authority of successive generations and depending upon the strength of his entire clan, has recklessly harmed the loyal and the good and frequently disobeyed the imperial commands. Finally, lacking in reverence towards the edicts of the late emperor, and unconcerned that he has plunged the people in their plenitude into an abyss, his pervasive criminality threatens to upend the Land of the Gods. Now We are father and mother to the people. If We do not chastise the traitor, what excuse shall We have to offer up to the spirit of the late emperor? What recompense can we offer to the people at large for this profound injury? This is the locus of Our sorrow and indignation. That the period of mourning shall be set aside is wholly inevitable. You must give substance to the wishes of our Heart. Put to death the traitorous official Yoshinobu. Once you have swiftly accomplished this heavenly deed, the tranquility of mountain-dwelling spirits shall be at hand. This is our wish. Do not hesitate or be negligent. Thirteenth day of the tenth month of Keiō 3 (8 November 1867) Fujiwara Tadayasu, Senior Second Rank Fujiwara Sanenaru, Senior Second Rank Fujiwara Tsuneyuki, Acting Middle Counsellor)
