= Tokugawa Ieyoshi =

Military ruler of Japan from 1837 to 1853

Senior First Rank Tokugawa Ieyoshi
- 徳川 家慶
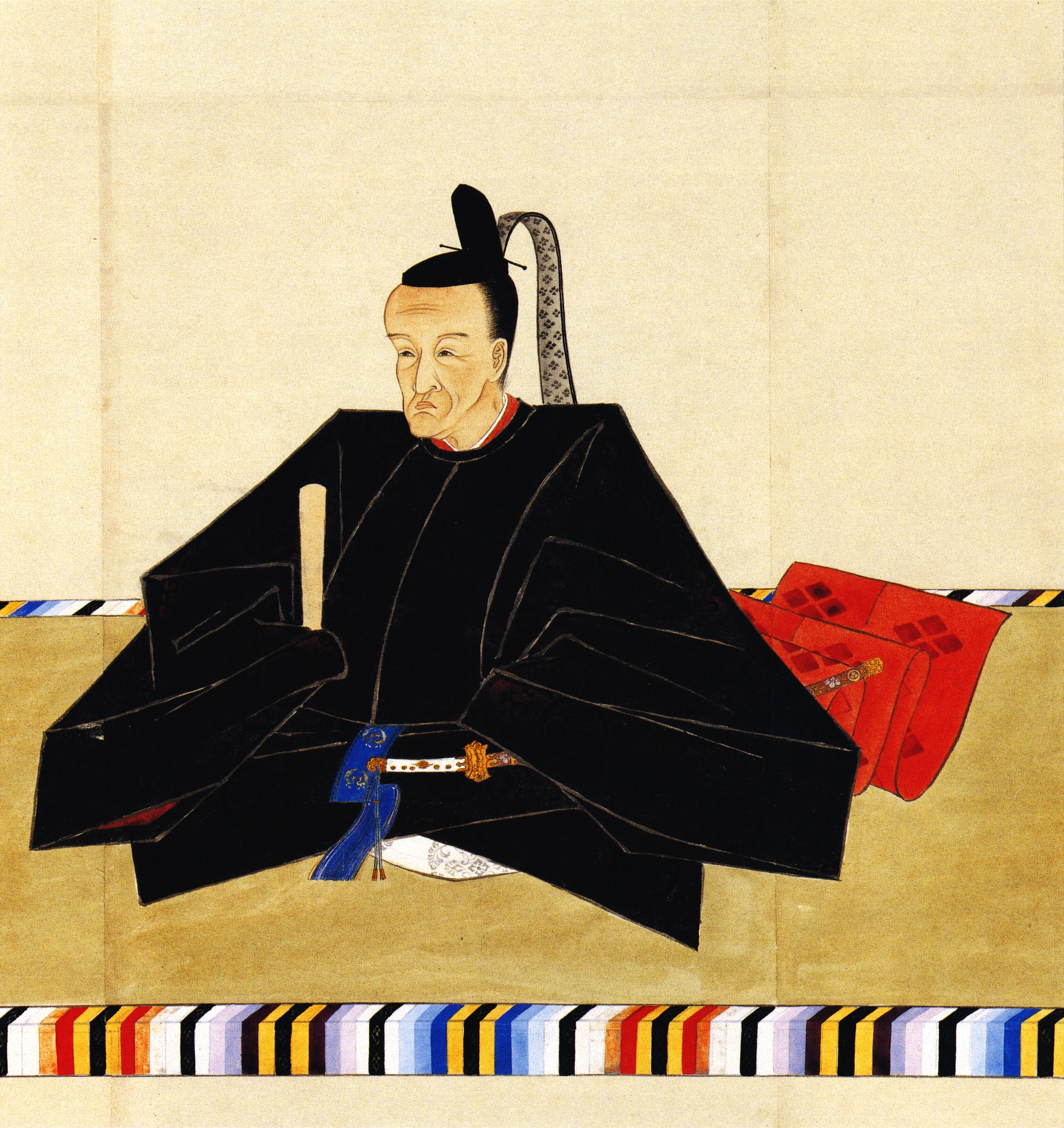

Shōgun
- In office 4 September 1837 – 27 July 1853
- Monarchs: Ninkō; Kōmei
- Preceded by: Tokugawa Ienari
- Succeeded by: Tokugawa Iesada

Personal details
- Born: 22 June 1793 Edo Castle, Edo, Tokugawa shogunate (now Tokyo, Japan)
- Died: 27 July 1853 (aged 60) Yokohama, Tokugawa shogunate
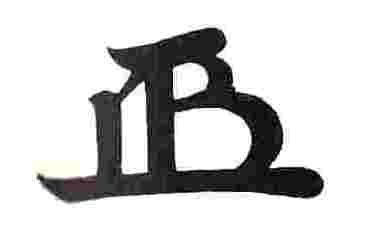
- Signature

Tokugawa Ieyoshi (徳川 家慶; 22 June 1793 – 27 July 1853; r. 1837–1853) was a Japanese samurai and daimyo who served as the 12th shōgun of the Tokugawa shogunate of Japan from 1837 until his death in 1853.

Ieyoshi was the son of the 11th shogun, Tokugawa Ienari, and took the office upon his father's resignation as shogun in 1837. At the end of his tenure, the Black Ships lead by Commodore Matthew Calbraith Perry arrived to Japan, beginning the bakumatsu era.

== Biography ==
Ieyoshi was born as the second son of the 11th shōgun, Tokugawa Ienari and named Toshijirō (敏次郎). Toshijirō was appointed heir on the death of his elder brother, Takechiyo. He became shogun on September 2, 1837, at the age of 45 upon the retirement of his father, Tokugawa Ienari. However, Ienari continued to wield much power from behind the throne, and it was not until after his death in 1841 that Senior Rōjū Mizuno Tadakuni was able to purge the government of his clique, and to implement measures to overhaul the shogunate's finances and controls in the aftermath of the Great Tenpō Famine of 1832–36.

Known as the Tenpō Reforms, these numerous sumptuary laws attempted to stabilize the economy through a return to the frugality, simplicity and discipline that were characteristic of the early Edo period, by banning most forms of entertainment and displays of wealth. The restrictions proved extremely unpopular with the commoners.

Increasing criticism of the government's handling of foreign affairs led to the Bansha no goku in 1839, suppressing rangaku studies.

Another part of the Reform included the Agechi-rei of 1843, which was to have daimyō in the vicinity of Edo and Ōsaka surrender their holdings for equal amounts of land elsewhere, thereby consolidating Tokugawa control over these strategically vital areas. However, this was also greatly unpopular amongst daimyō of all ranks and income levels. To complicate the situation further, in May 1844, Edo Castle burned down, and Mizuno Tadakuni was forced into exile and retirement in 1845. Mizuno was replaced by Doi Yoshitsura, Abe Masahiro and Tsutsui Masanori as rōjū.

Ieyoshi forced the retirement of Tokugawa Nariaki in 1844 and placed Nariaki's seventh son, Tokugawa Yoshinobu as head of the Hitotsubashi-Tokugawa house in 1847. He also forced the retirement of Shimazu Narioki in 1851.

In August 1844, William II of the Netherlands urged Japan to also open the mainland to trade, but was rejected. US Commodore Matthew Perry arrived on 3 June 1853, on a mission to force a treaty opening Japan to trade. Ieyoshi died on 27 July 1853, before the treaty could be concluded, of heart failure possibly brought on by heat stroke, and was succeeded by his third son Tokugawa Iesada. The following year the Tokugawa shogunate was forced to accept the American demands by signing the Convention of Kanagawa.

Tokugawa Ieyoshi's grave is at the Tokugawa family mausoleum at Zōjō-ji in Shiba. His Buddhist name was Shintokuin.

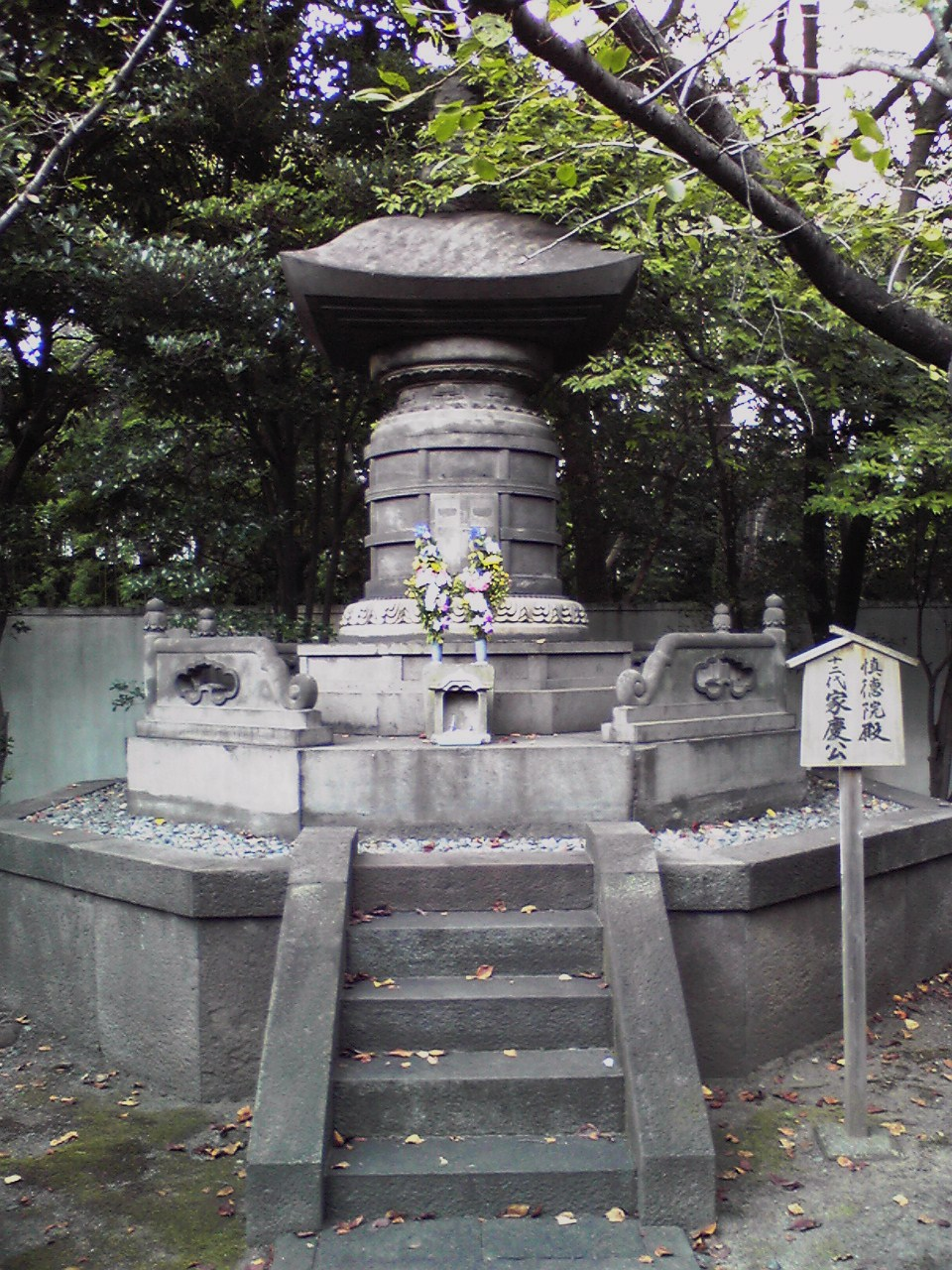
Ieyoshi's commemorative memorial at Zōjō-ji

== Family ==
Ieyoshi's official wife was Princess Takako (1795–1840), the sixth daughter of Prince Arisugawa Orihito. She relocated to Edo Castle in 1804 when she was only age 10, and they were formally wed in 1810. In 1813, she gave birth to a son, Takechiyo, followed by a daughter in 1815 and in 1816. In addition, Ieyoshi had another 13 sons and 11 daughters by numerous concubines; however, only one son, Tokugawa Iesada, lived past the age of 20.

- Father: Tokugawa Ienari
- Mother: Oraku no Kata (d.1810) later Korin'in
- Wife: Arisugawa Takako (1795–1840) later Jokan-in
- Concubine:
  - Ohana no Kata (d. 1844)
  - Okane no Kata (d. 1843) later Mi-ko-in
  - Ofude no Kata (d. 1844) later Shumyo-in
  - Omitsu no Kata (1807–1885) later Hojuin
  - Okoto no Kata (d. 1855) later Myoon'in
  - Otsuyu no Kata (d. 1888) later Shugetsuin
  - Okaju no Kata (1803–1826) later Myoka-in
  - Ohisa no Kata (d. 1847) later Seiryo-in
- Children:
  - Takechiyo (1813–1814) born by Takako
  - Tatsuhime (1814–1818) by Okaju
  - Tomohime (1815-1815) born by Takako
  - Saigen-in (1816-1816) born by Takako
  - Yochiyo (1819–1820) by Ohisa
  - Entsuin (1822-1822) by Okaju
  - Tokugawa Iesada born by Omitsu
  - Maihime (1824–1829) born by Ohana
  - Tokugawa Yoshimasa (1825–1838) of Hitotsubashi-Tokugawa Family born by Ohisa
  - Teruhime (1826–1840) married Tokugawa Yoshiyori and later known as Teimei-in born by Ohisa
  - Hanhime (1826-1826) by Okaju
  - Tokugawa Harunojo (1826–1827) by Omitsu
  - Tokugawa Atsugoro (1828–1829) by Omitsu
  - Tokugawa Jikimaru (1829–1830) by Ofude
  - Tokugawa Ginnojo (1832–1833) by Ofude
  - Satohime (1833–1834) by Okane
  - Chiehime (1835–1836) by Ofude
  - Yoshihime (1836–1837) by Okane
  - Tokugawa Kamegoro (1838–1839) by Ofude
  - Maijihime (1839–1840) by Okane
  - Wakahime (1842–1843) by Okane
  - Shoyo-in (1843-1843) by Okane
  - Okuhime (1844–1845) by Okoto
  - Tokugawa Tadashimaru (1845–1846) by Okoto
  - Shikihime (1848-1848) by Okoto
  - Sashin-in (1849-1849) by Otsuyu
  - Tokugawa Choyoshiro (1852–1853) by Okoto
- Adopted daughters:
  - Itonomiya Takako (1835–1856) married Tokugawa Yoshiatsu of Mito Domain had 1 daughter, Namahime (b. 1854) married Hachisuka Mochiaki
  - Akinomiya Akiko (1825–1913) married Arima Yorishige of Kurume Domain

== Events of Ieyoshi's bakufu ==
- 1837 (Tenpō 7): Tokugawa Ieyoshi becomes the 12th shōgun of the bakufu government.
- 1844 (Kōka 1): Era name changed due to fire which destroyed Edo Castle
- 1846 (Kōka 3): Kōmei becomes 121st Emperor of Japan.
- 1847 (Kōka 4): Zenkoji earthquake causes major damage in Shinano Province and surrounding areas
- 1848 (Kaei 1): Era name changed to acknowledge the beginning of the reign of the Emperor Kōmei
- 1853 (Kaei 6): Arrival of U.S. Commodore Matthew C. Perry and his fleet of Black Ships.

== Eras of Ieyoshi's bakufu ==
The years in which Ieyoshi was shōgun are more specifically identified by more than one era name or nengō.

- Tenpō (1830–1844)
- Kōka (1844–1848)
- Kaei (1848–1854)

== Ancestry ==
Ancestors of Tokugawa Ieyoshi

8. Tokugawa Munetada, 1st Hitotsubashi-Tokugawa family head (1721-1765)
4. Tokugawa Harusada, 2nd Hitotsubashi-Tokugawa family head (1751-1827)
9. Hosoda (Oyuka no Kata)
2. Tokugawa Ienari, 11th Tokugawa Shōgun (1773-1841)
10. Iwamoto Masatoshi
5. Otomi no Kata (d. 1817)
1. Tokugawa Ieyoshi, 12th Tokugawa Shōgun
6. Oshida Toshikatsu
3. Korin'in (d. 1810)

== Notes ==
Military offices
Preceded by Tokugawa Ienari	Shōgun: Tokugawa Ieyoshi; 1837–1853	Succeeded by Tokugawa Iesada
