= Kanetake =

- Gender: Male

Origin
- Origin: Japanese
- Meaning: Different meanings depending on the kanji used

Kanetake (written: 兼武) is a masculine Japanese given name. Notable people with the name include:

- Kanetake Ebikawa (海老川 兼武; born 1973), Japanese anime mechanical designer
- Kimotsuki Kanetake (肝付 兼武; 1823–1888), Japanese samurai and scholar
- Ōura Kanetake (大浦 兼武; 1850–1918), Japanese politician and bureaucrat
