= Museum of the Meiji Restoration =

Coordinates: 31°35′4.7″N 130°32′51.9″E

- 維新ふるさと館
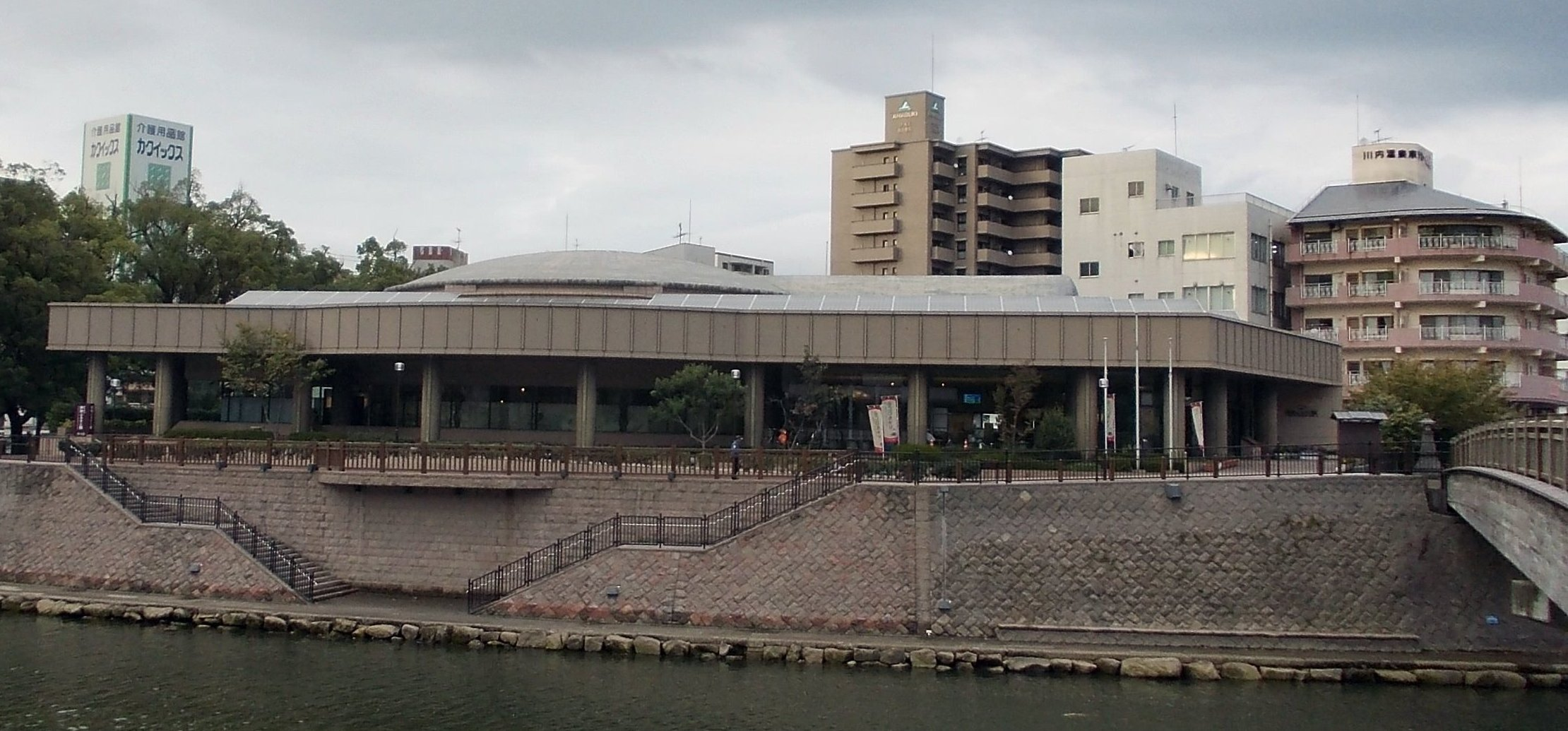
- Location: Kagoshima City
- Accreditation: Kagoshima Tourism Convention Association
- Key holdings: Artifacts relevant to the Meiji Restoration
- Visitors: 157, 351 (2015)
- Website: http://www.ishinfurusatokan.info/

The Museum of the Meiji Restoration (維新ふるさと館, Ishin-furusato-kan) is a history museum in Kagoshima, Japan. Located by the Kōtsuki River, it is a gallery where visitors can learn about the Meiji Restoration. In the basement hall, sound, light, and robots are used to present a three-dimensional experience of the Meiji Restoration. On the first floor, exhibits describe the people, things, and events of Satsuma Province.

== See also ==
- Satsuma Domain
- Shimazu Hisamitsu
- Saigō Takamori
- Ōkubo Toshimichi
- Bakumatsu
