= Zusho Hirosato =

Japanese samurai

- 調所 広郷
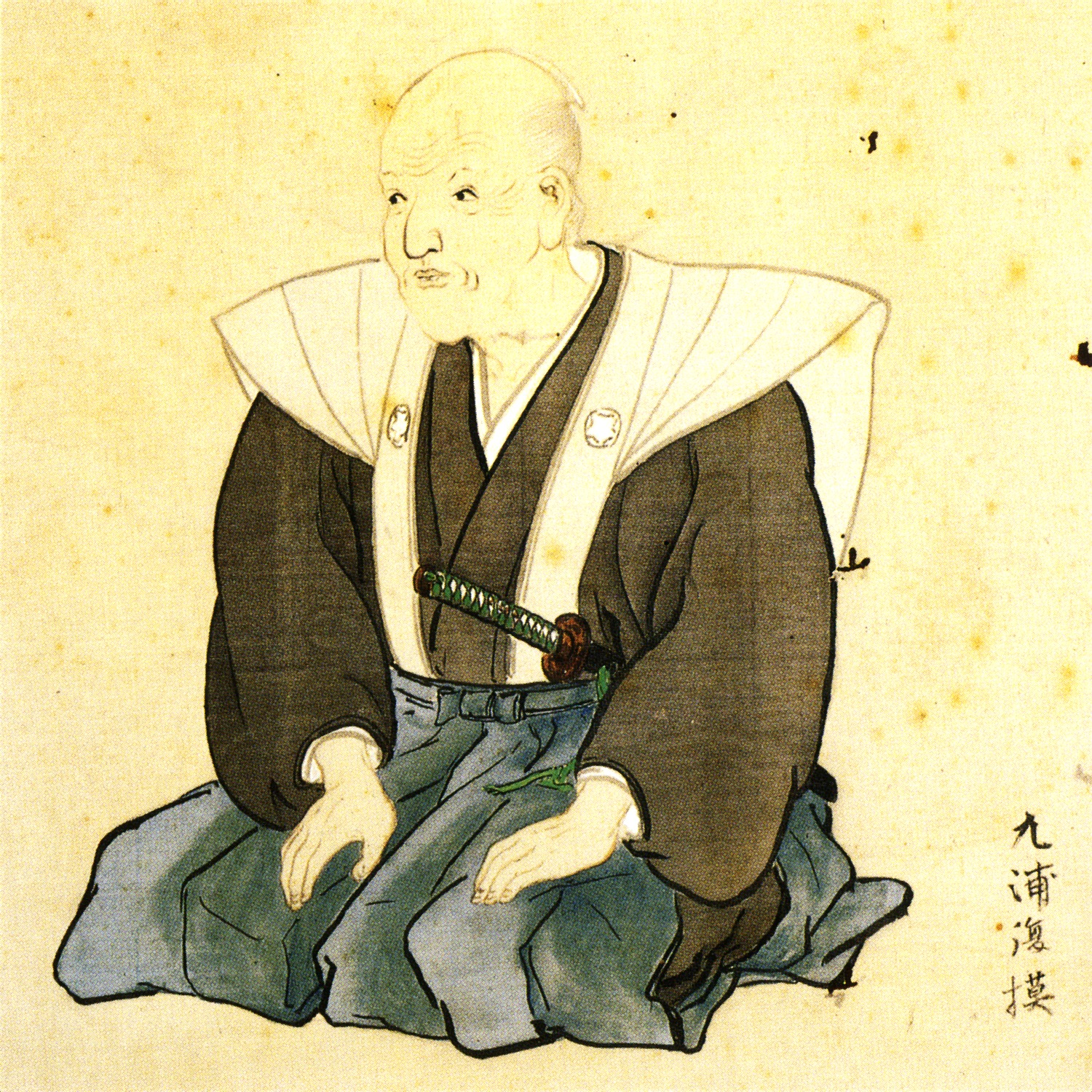
- Born: March 24, 1776; Kagoshima, Satsuma Domain, Japan
- Died: January 13, 1849 (aged 72); Edo, Japan
- Occupation: Karō of the Satsuma Domain

Zusho Shōzaemon Hirosato (調所 笑左衛門 広郷; March 24, 1776 – January 13, 1849) was a Japanese samurai of the late Edo period, who served as karō of the Satsuma Domain.

== Biography ==
Zusho was born in the Kagoshima castle town in 1776, the son of Satsuma samurai Kawasaki Motoaki. At age 12 he was adopted by Zusho Kiyonobu; at 22, he was sent to Edo as a tea assistant to the retired lord of Satsuma, Shimazu Shigehide. Shigehide recognized Zusho's talents, and gave him further responsibilities. He was later employed by the Satsuma lord, Shimazu Narioki, serving Narioki as messenger and city magistrate; he was also involved with Satsuma's illicit trade with the Qing Empire and the west, via the Ryukyu Islands. In 1832, he was elevated to karō status; six years later he formally received the rank of karō. As karō, he was involved with finance, agriculture, and military reform.

At the time, the Satsuma domain's debt totaled over 5 million ryō. In order to address this problem, he began a program of administrative and agricultural reforms, and levied a no-interest loan on the merchants of Satsuma, to be repaid over the course of 250 years. This means that the domain had promised to repay the loan from then until 2085; however, with the breakup of the domains in 1872, the Meiji government declared this debt to be invalid. Zusho also increased the level of illicit trade taking place with the Qing Empire, via the Ryukyu Islands. Zusho also put a monopoly system in place on the local sugar trade, and increased trade and production levels; by 1840, this had produced a 2,500,000 ryō surplus for the Satsuma domain.

However, Zusho soon became embroiled in the dispute over who would succeed Narioki: his eldest son Nariakira, or Nariakira's half-brother Hisamitsu. Narioki and Zusho's preference was Hisamitsu; Zusho was also worried that Nariakira, interested in western things as Shigehide had been, would ruin the domain's finances, which he had worked so hard to restore.

Nariakira, aiming to remove his political enemies Narioki and Zusho from power, secretly revealed the illicit Ryukyu trade to the rōjū, Abe Masahiro. In 1848, while Zusho was in Edo, he was summoned by Abe for an inquiry into the secret trade. Soon after this trade was revealed, Zusho died suddenly in one of the Satsuma residences in Edo; he is believed to have either committed seppuku or taken poison, in order to protect Narioki from further endangerment. His age at death was 73. After Zusho's death, his family had its residence, income, and status confiscated by Nariakira. Zusho's grave is located at Fukushōji temple, in modern Kagoshima City.

== Legacy ==
In the Bakumatsu period, the Satsuma domain was unlike most other domains in Japan, as it possessed large numbers of steam-driven warships and cannons. This is almost miraculous, given that only one generation previously, the domain was over 5 million ryō in debt; Satsuma's annual income barely exceeded 120,000 to 140,000 ryō. It is thanks to Zusho Hirosato's budget-balancing efforts that this level of military buildup was possible for Satsuma.

A statue of Zusho now stands at Tenpōzan Park in Kagoshima City.
