= Seisen University (Tokyo) =

Catholic women's college in Tokyo, Japan

Coordinates: 35°37′39″N 139°43′44″E

- 清泉女子大学
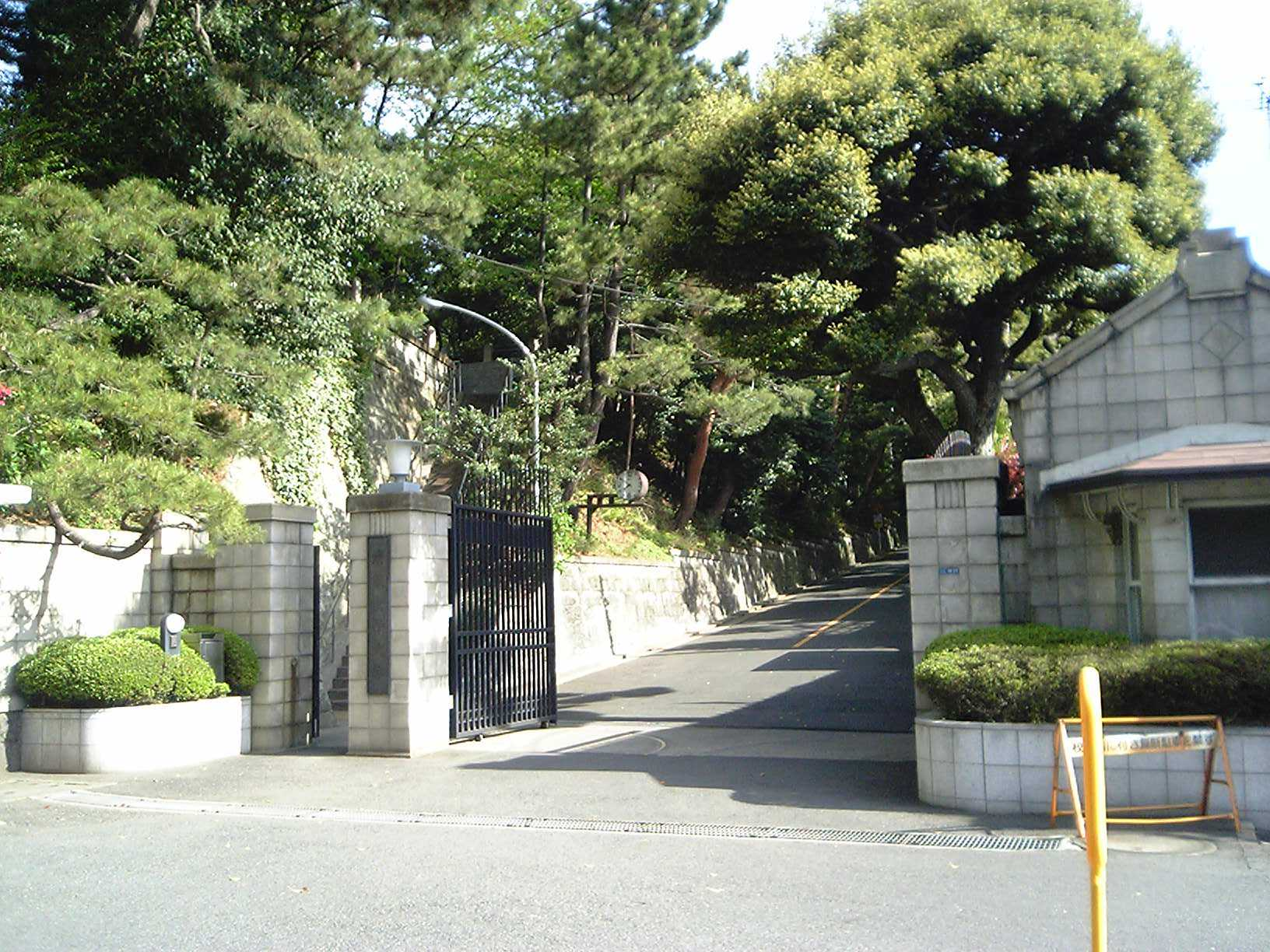
- Former name: Seisenryōgakuin
- Motto: VERITAS et CARITAS
- Motto in English: TRUTH and LOVE
- Type: Private college
- Established: 1938
- President: Takahiro Saeki, Ph.D.
- Faculty: 52 (full time), 218 (part time)
- Students: 1,906
- Undergraduates: 1,887
- Postgraduates: 19
- Location: Shinagawa, Tokyo, Japan
- Website: www.seisen-u.ac.jp/eng/index.php

Seisen University (清泉女子大学, Seisen Joshi Daigaku) is a private Catholic liberal arts women's college in Shinagawa, Tokyo, Japan.

== History ==
The predecessor of the school, Seisenryōgakuin (清泉寮学院), was founded in 1938 by the Handmaids of the Sacred Heart of Jesus. It was chartered as a women's four-year college in 1950.

== Organization ==
=== Undergraduate studies ===
- Department of Spanish Language and Literature
- Department of English Language and Literature
- Department of Global Citizenship Studies
- Department of Cultural History
- Department of Japanese Language and Literature

=== Graduate School of Humanities ===
- Master's Program in Language and Culture
- Master's Program in Thought and Culture
- Master's Program in Global Citizenship Studies
- Doctoral Program in Humanities

=== Research institutes ===
- Research Institute for Cultural Studies
- Research Institute for Christian Culture
- Research Institute for Language Education

== Campus ==
=== Address ===
3-16-21 Higashi Gotanda, Shinagawa-ku, Tokyo, 141-8642, Japan

=== Facilities ===
The university's Italian Renaissance style main building designed by Josiah Conder was built as Prince Shimazu Tadashige's mansion in 1917.
