= Shimazu Nariakira =

Japanese feudal lord (daimyō)

Shimazu Nariakira Senior First Rank
- 島津 斉彬
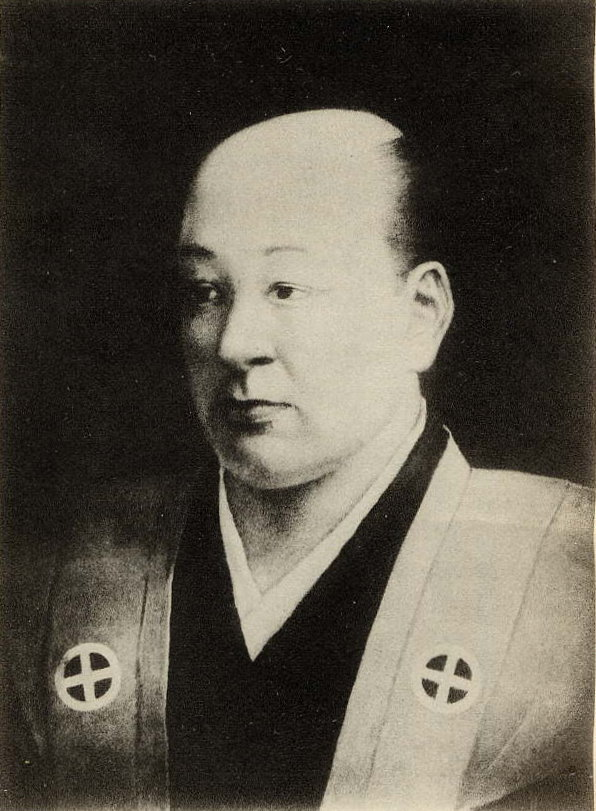

Daimyō of Satsuma
- In office 1851–1858
- Preceded by: Shimazu Narioki
- Succeeded by: Shimazu Tadayoshi

Personal details
- Born: April 28, 1809 Edo, Japan
- Died: July 16, 1858 (aged 49)
- Spouse: Tokugawa Tsunehime
- Awards: Senior First Rank

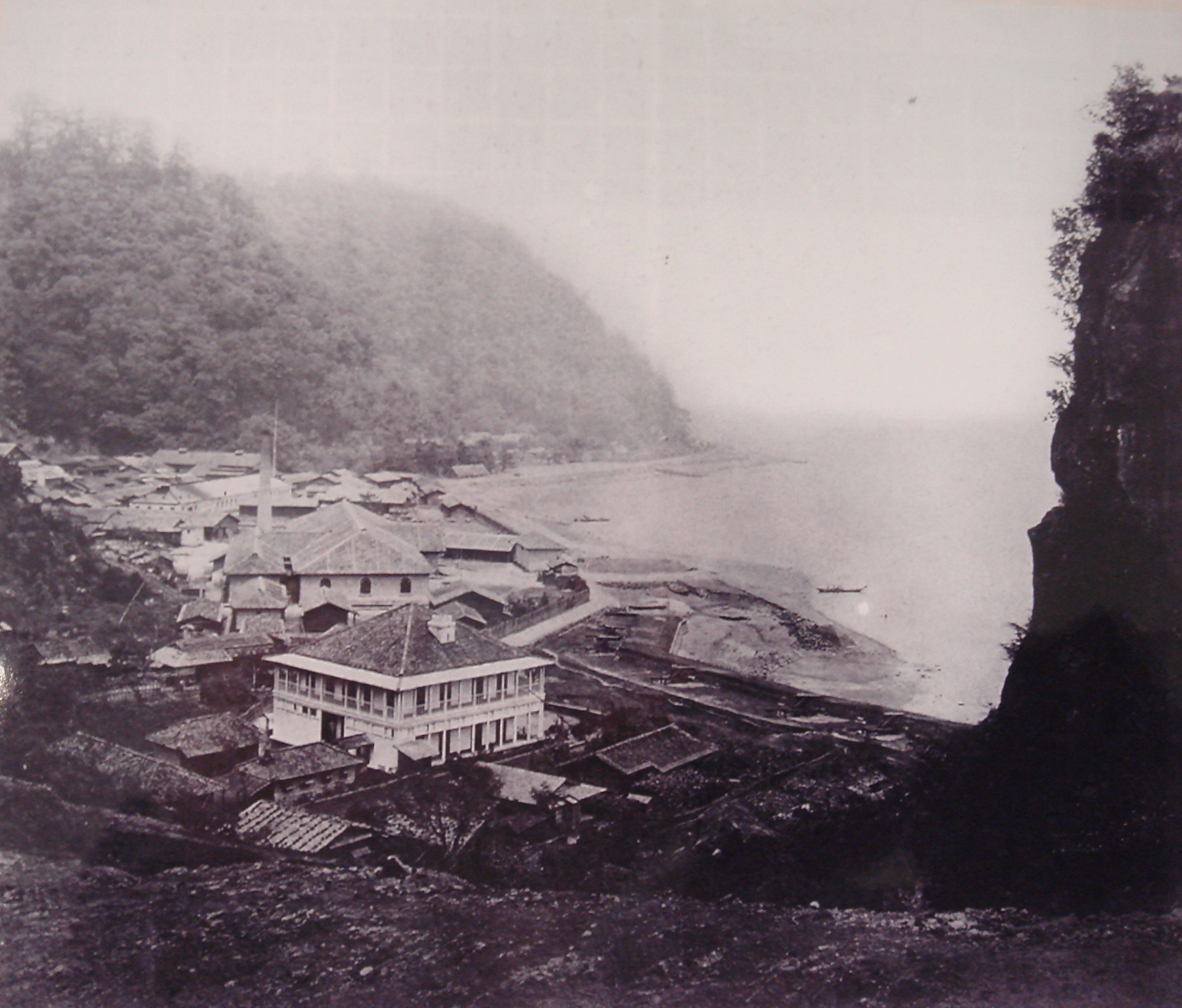
The Shūseikan (集成館) industrial area established by Shimazu Nariakira in 1852 in Iso (磯), Satsuma Province. A "foreigner's building" (異人館) was built to house seven English technicians, (head of these being one E. Home). 1872 photograph.

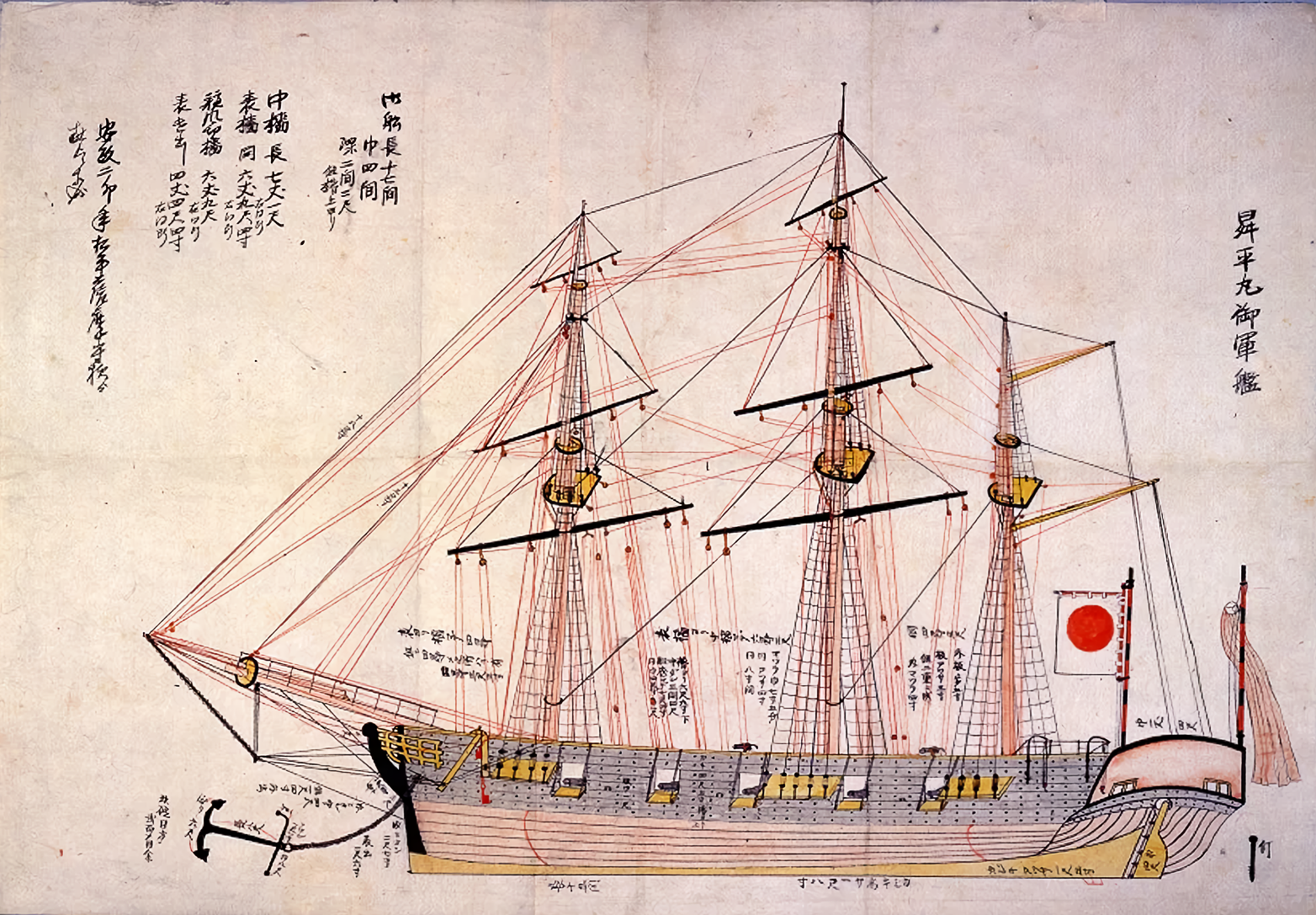
The 1854 Shōhei Maru, Japan's first Western warship, was built from Dutch technical drawings, under Nariakira.

Shimazu Nariakira (島津 斉彬; Japanese pronunciation: [ɕí.mä̀.(d͡)zɨ̀ | nä̀.ɾʲí.ä́.k̟ʲì.ɾä̀], April 28, 1809 – August 24, 1858) was a Japanese feudal lord (daimyō) of the Edo period, the 28th in the line of Shimazu clan lords of Satsuma Domain.

He was renowned as an intelligent and wise lord, and was greatly interested in Western learning and technology. He was enshrined after death as the Shinto kami Terukuni Daimyōjin (照国大明神) in May 1863.

== Early life and rise to power ==
Shimazu Nariakira was born at the Satsuma domain's estate in Edo, on April 28, 1809. From his mother, he was descendant of Date Masamune, Tokugawa Ieyasu and Oda Nobunaga. He rose to power as daimyō of the domain of Satsuma only after surviving a gruesome and arduous war within his own family and domain, known as the Oyura Sōdō or the Takasaki Kuzure. He faced much opposition in Satsuma since he spent most of his life in Edo (a compulsory requirement as the heir of a daimyo, set by the Shogunate); as such he was considered a stranger in his own domain. In his quest to prepare Satsuma for potential Western aggression, he also faced many opposing military schools of thought in Satsuma who disagreed with the Shimazu family's plan for strengthening coastal defense.

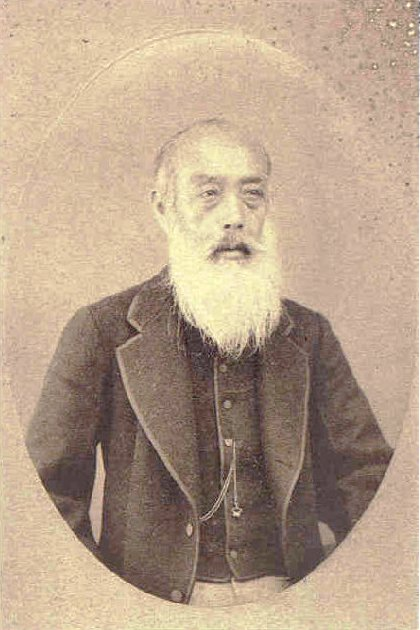
Marquess Kuroda Nagahiro, a close relative of Shimazu Nariakira.

Nariakira did not see eye to eye with his father, Shimazu Narioki, or his father's chief advisor, Zusho Hirosato. Both Narioki and Zusho were wary of the Tokugawa shogunate. Zusho also saw many similarities in Nariakira and his grandfather, Shigehide. Shigehide also had a great interest in Dutch studies as well as scientific and industrial projects, which promptly led to the deterioration of the domain's financial position. Having worked so hard to rehabilitate and strengthen the treasury of Satsuma, Zusho did not encourage Nariakira's ambitious and costly program for a military build-up. Narioki and Zusho's mutual disdain and mistrust for Nariakira led to their endeavoring to isolate Nariakira from Satsuma's affairs, which entailed withholding or altogether ceasing the flow from all sources of information regarding Satsuma's officials or their dealings with the shogunate.

Another formidable and dangerous obstacle for Nariakira in not only his plans to bolster the defenses of all of Japan but also his ascendancy to daimyō of Satsuma was Yura, the mother of his half-brother, Hisamitsu. By the time Nariakira had arrived in Satsuma to address a crisis related to the Ryūkyū Kingdom (a vassal state under Satsuma) in 1846, Yura had used her charm to thoroughly convince Narioki to promote the interests of her son Hisamitsu over Narioki's legitimate son and heir-apparent (Nariakira). Zusho, Narioki, Yura, and Hisamitsu were the key members of the coalition which rallied other Satsuma bureaucrats who felt threatened by Nariakira's immense and highly intimidating intelligence, and tried to impede all attempts Nariakira made to retire his father as daimyō and take his place.

Nariakira arrived in Satsuma to attempt to resolve the Ryūkyū crisis, as per the orders of shogunal high official Abe Masahiro, on June 25, 1846. A French ship had arrived in Ryūkyū in 1844, and two British ships the following year, demanding treaties of amity and commerce; as the kingdom was semi-independent and not generally regarded to be part of Japan proper, this presented a dilemma. Nariakira and Abe Masahiro decided in the end that, despite the shogunate's policies of seclusion, such relations should be allowed in Ryūkyū, rather than risking violent conflict with the Western powers.

On March 8, 1847, Narioki arrived in Satsuma, making Nariakira's position, something equivalent to deputy to his father, obsolete. After essentially having the reins of power wrenched from his hands by his own father, Nariakira left Satsuma for Edo. The authority formerly vested him was clearly and quickly being shifted to his half brother, Hisamitsu Hisamitsu was rapidly elevated through the ranks of his father's court soon after Nariakira's departure from Satsuma for Edo. He was placed in charge of the newly created office of military service of Satsuma in October 1847. In 1848, Narioki appointed Hisamitsu steward of Chosa District, with the responsibility of acting on behalf of the daimyō in all military matters in the area. At about the same time, Hisamitsu was given the highly respected post of han councilor, a rank which, according to the instructions accompanying the appointment, placed him at the top of the social scale. At ceremonial occasions, Hisamitsu was ordered by his father to sit at a place higher than that of the deputy in charge of the daimyō of Satsuma's castle. Narioki even went so far as to place Hisamitsu in charge of all of Satsuma whenever the daimyō chose to leave Satsuma for any reason, business or pleasure. It was apparent that Hisamitsu was being groomed to become the next daimyō, completely disregarding the fact that, by primogeniture, Nariakira was supposed to be the heir-apparent.

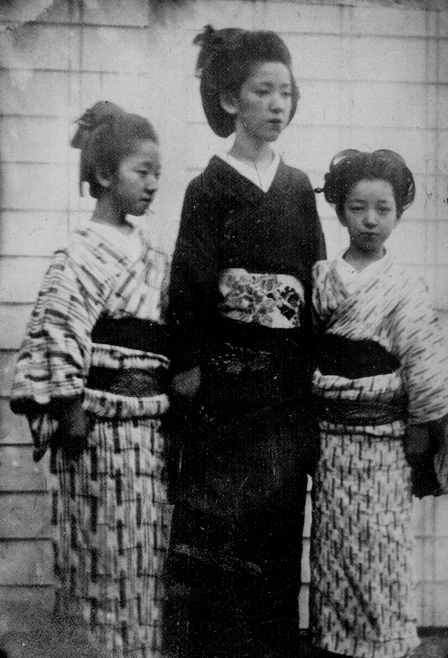
Shimazu Nariakira's daughters

To further discredit and impede Nariakira's rise to lord of Satsuma, Yura was rumored to have asked at least five spiritual leaders to cast spells on Nariakira's eldest sons as well as take other measures to curse Nariakira's children. Many of Nariakira's followers believed Yura was the source of the subsequent deaths of his eldest children. This belief caused many of them to call for the assassination of Yura, her son Hisamitsu, and Zusho, who they felt also played a hand in the deaths of Nariakira's eldest children. Nariakira was able to restrain them; upon hearing of their plans for murder, Narioki began rooting out Nariakira's supporters and ordering their deaths by seppuku.

The conflict had gotten so far out of hand that Nariakira was left with no choice but to request aid from Abe Masahiro. Abe, seeing that Nariakira was being hindered in his proceeding with the Ryūkyū crisis by his own father and family retainers, aided in getting Narioki to retire and removing Zusho.

Abe first went about the task of removing Zusho, who was greatly relied upon by Narioki, by inviting him to Edo. Abe's stated purpose was a desire to discuss the Ryūkyū crisis and its current handling. In the process of the conversation, Abe began to ask Zusho a line of questioning that made it apparently clear to Zusho that Abe, as well as the Tokugawa shōgun, knew the truth of the illegal Satsuma-Ryūkyū-Western trade relations, which were being carried out against the shogunate's policy of seclusion. Zusho's devotion to Narioki pushed him to take full responsibility for the illicit trade by committing seppuku on December 18, 1848. On December 3, 1850, Narioki was called to Edo by the shōgun and presented with a prized set of tea utensils, indicating the shōgun's desire for Narioki to retire. On February 3, 1851, Nairoki retired and Shimazu Nariakira was made daimyō of Satsuma.

== Love of education and Western culture ==
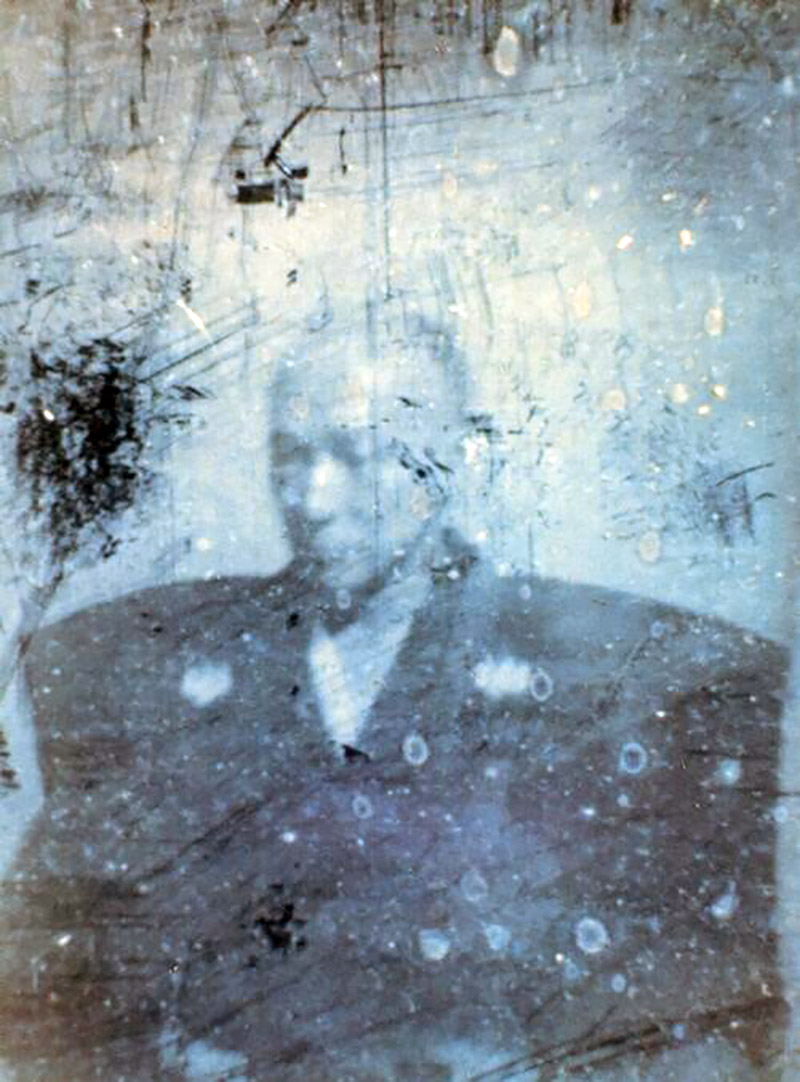
A daguerreotype of Shimazu, the earliest surviving Japanese photograph. It was created by one of his retainers, Ichiki Shirō in 1857.

Nariakira was considered one of the wisest daimyō of his time, due to his appreciation of education.

In 1812, at age three, Nariakira was designated the heir to the Satsuma lordship by his father. As with any daimyō’s heir, Nariakira was prepared for his future role, by receiving a well-rounded education in the martial and scholarly arts. As stated above, Nariakira shared his grandfather Shigehide's fascination with Western culture and learning. The young Nariakira was fascinated by his grandfather's collection of western items, which included clocks, musical instruments, telescopes, microscopes, and weapons. In the course of his education, he was also taught how to read and write Roman letters, and would later use Roman letters to write Japanese words as a personal form of code. Shigehide also introduced Nariakira to Philipp Franz von Siebold, a German physician serving as the director of the Dutch East India Company (Vereenigde Oostindische Compagnie) in Nagasaki, making him one of the few Japanese to have actually met a Westerner.

After he became daimyō of Satsuma, Nariakira had Minayoshi Hotoku, a Satsuma physician, build the Iroha-maru, one of the first Western-style ships built in Japan. It was based on Minayoshi's 6-foot-long (1.8 m), 3-foot-wide (0.91 m) model. Nariakira then built a shipyard for Western-style shipbuilding at Sakurajima. He carried his love of Western culture into the military of Satsuma where he implemented Western-style cavalry and demanded annual military field maneuvers. However, without the Satsuma budget that had been so carefully restored by his enemy Zusho, none of this would have been possible.

He also began enacting educational changes in Satsuma geared at bringing in Western science and technology. Nariakira established the Rangaku Koshujo, a school for the study of the Dutch language and Western culture. He would frequently visit schools and ask students to explain the meaning of the Confucian texts, to ensure that their Western learning did not corrupt their sense of nationalism. So strong was Nariakira's desire to raise well-educated youths that he set aside four koku annually to feed starving scholars, essentially a form of financial aid or scholarship. His goal in promoting education in Satsuma was to make sure the youths of Satsuma were “taught to master themselves, rule their homes wisely, preserve national peace, and trust the universal power.”

In 1848, Shimazu obtained the first daguerreotype camera ever imported into Japan, and ordered his retainers to study it and produce working photographs. Due to the limitations of the lens used and the lack of formal training, it took many years for a quality photograph to be created, but on September 17, 1857, a portrait of Shimazu in formal attire was produced. This photograph became an object of worship in the Terukuni Shrine (照国神社, Terukuni jinja) (also referred to as Shōkoku Shrine) after Shimazu's death, but it later went missing. Lost for a century, the daguerreotype was discovered in a warehouse in 1975 and was later determined to be the oldest daguerreotype in existence created by a Japanese photographer. For this reason, it was designated an Important Cultural Property by the government of Japan in 1999, the first photograph ever given this honor.

== Associates and death ==
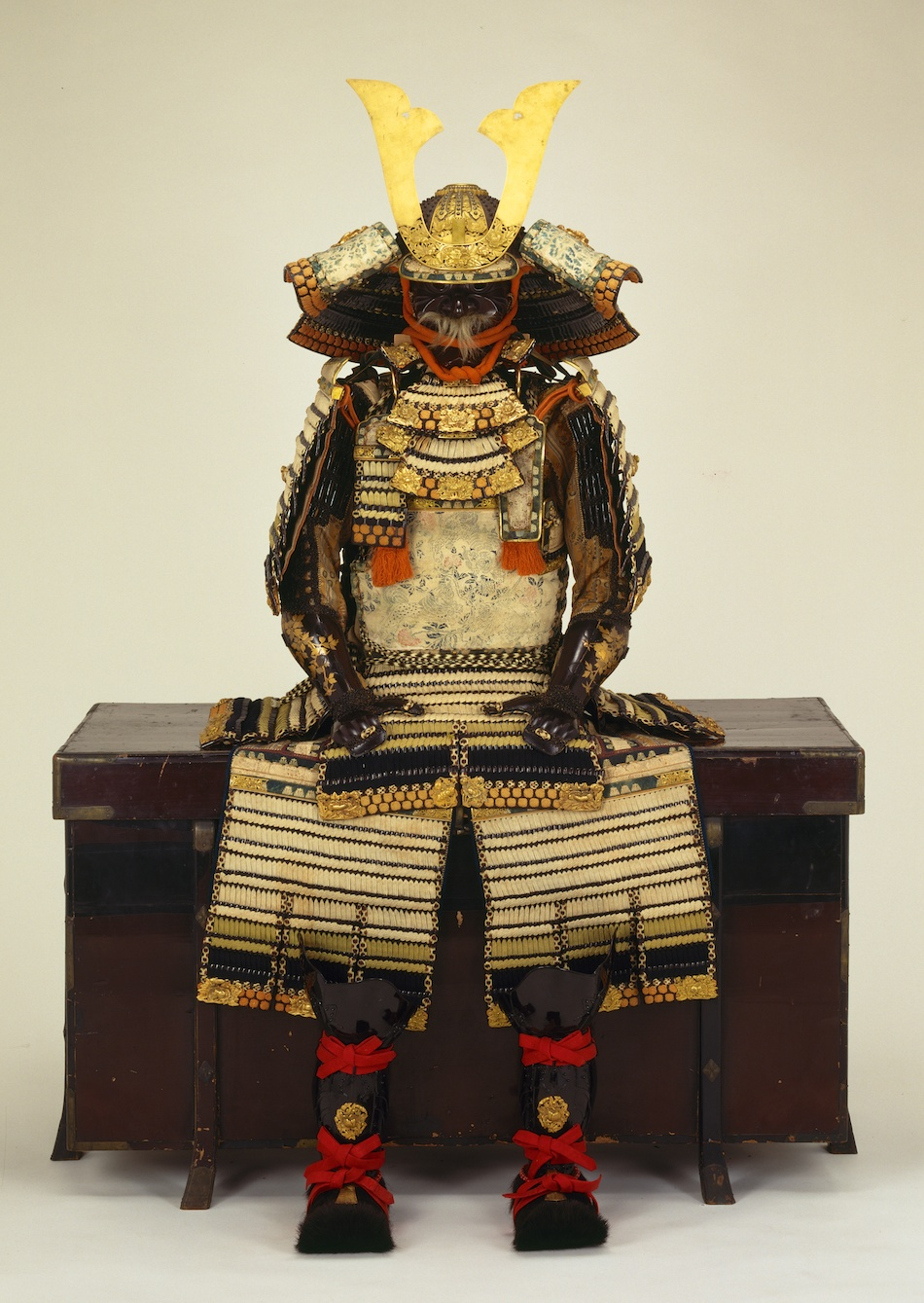
Ō-yoroi owned by Shimazu Nariakira. Tokyo Fuji Art Museum

In the course of his life, Nariakira made many friends in high places. These connections came in handy during his efforts to force the retirement of his father. Abe Masahiro, who at the time was a rōjū, was one of these friends. Abe spoke on behalf of the Tokugawa shōgun in regards to Japan's national military defense and was the one who placed Nariakira in charge of Satsuma's dealing with the Ryūkyū Western Trade Treaty crisis.

Abe, and indirectly, the Tokugawa shōgun, were disturbed by Nariakira's removal from responsibility over the Ryūkyū Western Trade Treaty crisis because their policy concerning the crisis was predicated on their trust in him, not in his father or Zusho Hirosato. Narioki and Zusho had already proven themselves untrustworthy by not being completely reliable on matters concerning Ryūkyū. Abe knew that the only way Nariakira could gain control of the Ryūkyū crisis was if his father and Zusho were removed; through Abe's intervention, this too was accomplished.

Since Narioki and Zusho together ceased the flow of information regarding Satsuma's officials or their dealings with Ryūkyū to Nariakira, Nariakira had to establish his own information-gathering network. He relied on Date Munenari of Uwajima to explain his predicament to the Tokugawa shogunate and Abe. He instructed his associates Yamaguchi Sadayasu and Shimazu Hisataka to gather information in Satsuma for him as well as keep a close watch on Zusho's activities with special emphasis on goods and money being brought into the domain. Nariakira then decided it was time to make his bid for the lordship of Satsuma. He relied on Date Munenari to report the situation for him and gain the sympathies of Abe. In a letter addressed to Date on August 27, 1848, Nariakira thanks him for obtaining Abe's assurance that he would overlook Nairoki and Zusho's transgressions and not take Satsuma to court as long as the Ryūkyū problem was resolved satisfactorily. Date's correspondence with Abe served to hasten Narioki's retirement and Nariakira's ascendancy as daimyō of Satsuma.

Once Nariakira became daimyō, he needed loyal men to ensure that Yura and Narioki's continued efforts to undermine his power did not succeed. Saigō Takamori, a low-ranking Satsuma samurai, was promoted from assistant clerk, to Nariakira's attendant, in 1854. Ōkubo Toshimichi was exiled by Narioki for supporting Nariakira, but once Nariakira came to power he was pardoned and rose rapidly through the ranks. Saigō and Ōkubo worked on Nariakira's behalf, speaking with Nariaki, the lord of Mito to convince him to back Nariakira's view that government should have greater focus on the emperor and less on the shōgun. Saigo and Ōkubo adopted many of Nariakira's views, which would later become the foundation of the new Meiji government. These views included centralizing the government around the emperor, and Westernizing the Japanese military.

Shortly before his death, Nariakira was left with only a two-year-old son (Tetsumaru) and eight-year-old daughter (Teruhime). He had been forced to ask Narioki to decide between Hisamitsu or Hisamitsu's son Tadayoshi to succeed him as daimyō. Saigō and Ōkubo felt the death of all of Nariakira's viable heirs was caused by Yura and wanted retribution, but Nariakira would not allow it. On July 8, 1858, Nariakira was supervising the joint preparatory maneuvers in Tempozan for sending 3,000 Satsuma soldiers to Edo, and he succumbed to the heat. He was transported to Tsurumaru Castle, where he died on the 16th. A few years after his death, he was deified as a Shinto kami, Terukuni-daimyōjin. His son Tetsumaru died shortly after his father.

== Family ==
- Father: Shimazu Narioki
- Mother: Iyohime (1792–1824)
- Wife: Tokugawa Tsunehime, daughter of Tokugawa Nariatsu, third head of the Hitotsubashi branch of the Tokugawa family
- Children:
  - Kannosuke (1845–1848)
  - Tetsumaru
  - Hironosuke
  - Kikusaburo by Tsunehime
  - Tokunosuke (1848–1849)
  - Tetsumaru (1856–1858)
  - Torajumaru (1849–1854)
  - Morinoshin
  - Sumihime
  - Kunihime
  - Teruhime (1851–1869) married Shimazu Tadayoshi
  - Norihime (1852–1908) married Shimazu Uzuhiko of Shimazu-Echizen family
  - Yasuhime (1853–1879) married Shimazu Tadayoshi
- Adopted daughters:
  - Tenshō-in
  - Shimazu Mitsuko, married Konoe Tadafusa

== Honours ==
- Senior First Rank (May 16, 1901; posthumous)

== See also ==
- Ansei Purge
- Sengan-en

== Notes ==
Preceded by Shimazu Narioki	Daimyō of Satsuma; 1851–1858	Succeeded by Shimazu Tadayoshi
