= Shimazu Tadashige =

Japanese politician

Prince Shimazu Tadashige
- 島津 忠重
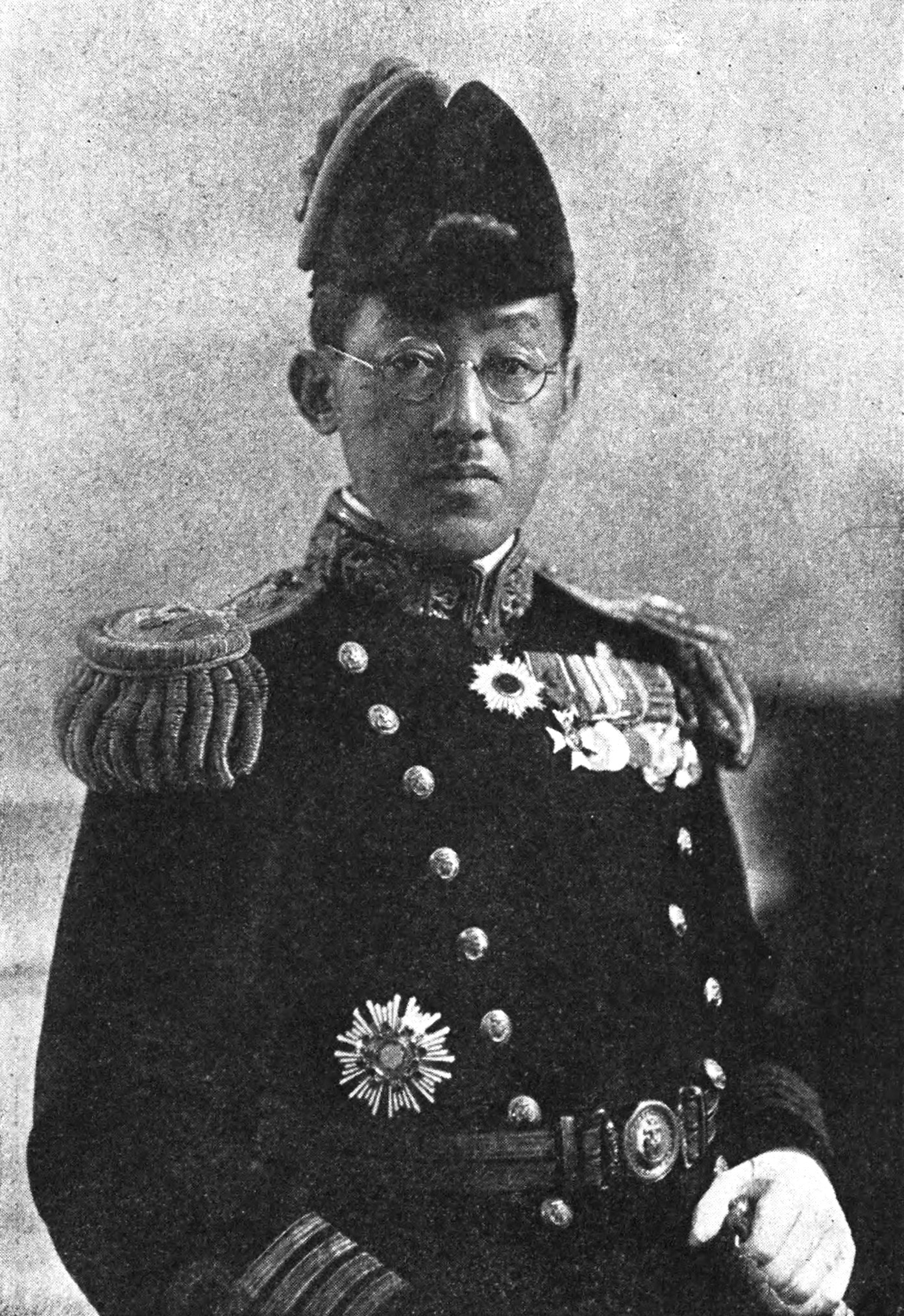
- Born: 20 October 1886; Kagoshima, Japan
- Died: 4 April 1968 (aged 81); Tokyo, Japan
- Military career
- Allegiance: Empire of Japan
- Branch: Imperial Japanese Navy
- Service years: 1907–1935
- Rank: Rear Admiral

Member of the House of Peers
- In office 19 October 1911 – 9 May 1946 Hereditary peerage

Prince Shimazu Tadashige (島津 忠重; 20 October 1886 – 4 April 1968), was the son of Shimazu Tadayoshi and 30th head of the Shimazu clan. He was a naval officer, and rear admiral in the Imperial Japanese Navy. His wife was the daughter of Tokudaiji Sanetsune.

== Biography ==
A native of Kagoshima, Shimazu was largely raised at the Shimazu residence in Tokyo, where he attended the Gakushuin Peers’ School. In 1904, he entered the Imperial Japanese Naval Academy, and graduated from the 35th class ranked 79th out of 172 cadets. He served his midshipman duty aboard the cruiser Itsukushima and battleship Fuji. After being commissioned as an ensign, he was assigned to the cruisers Katori and Izumo.

Shimazu returned to specialized weaponry schools and became a torpedo and naval artillery expert. As a sub-lieutenant, he served on the battleship Iwami and again on Katori. From 1911 to 1913, he left active service to assume his seat in the House of Peers, returning in December 1914 to the battleship Settsu after having completed navigation and advanced gunnery training. As lieutenant, he served aboard the Tsukuba and Kawachi during World War I, but saw no combat.

After graduation from the Japanese Naval War College in December 1920, he was promoted to lieutenant commander. He went England at his own expense from December 1921 to 1923. On his return, he was appointed to the Imperial Japanese Navy General Staff and became an instructor at the Naval War College. He was promoted to commander in December 1924. Shimazu was then appointed as military attaché to England from December 1928 to December 1930. While in England, he was promoted to captain.

After his return to Japan, Shimazu served on the Navy General Staff, and was promoted to rear admiral on 15 November 1935. He retired from active service a month later, on 15 December 1935. After retirement, he served in an advisory capacity to the Gakushuin.

During the occupation of Japan, his palace in Tokyo (which had been designed by Josiah Conder in 1915), was seized by the American occupation forces, and is now the main hall for Seisen University.

In the postwar era, he was involved in a number of financial scandals, notably with regards to the Shimazu Kosan Company. He was forced to sell off most of his inheritance to make ends meet, including the Shimazu clan archives, which went to Tokyo University. He died in 1968 at the age of 81.
