= Hitotsubashi Nariatsu =

Japanese samurai

Hitotsubashi Nariatsu (一橋 斉敦, 1780–1816), was the third head of the Hitotsubashi branch of the Tokugawa family in Japan. The younger brother of Tokugawa Ienari, the eleventh shōgun, he succeeded the Hitotsubashi family in 1791.

His childhood name was Konosuke (好之助).

== Family ==
- Father: Tokugawa Harusada (1751-1827)
- Mother: Otomi no Kata (d.1817)
- Wife: Ichijo Yasuko
- Concubines:
  - Nojiri-dono
  - Higuchi-dono
- Children:
  - Katsuchiyo
  - Tokugawa Narinori (1803-1830) by Nojiri
  - Nobunosuke
  - Rikihime married Arima Yorinori
  - Tsunehime (1805-1858) married Shimazu Nariakira
  - Kikuhime married Okudaira Nobumasa by Higuchi

Preceded by Tokugawa Harusada	3rd Hitotsubashi-Tokugawa lord 1799-1816	Succeeded by Tokugawa Narinori
