= Shimazu Tadayoshi (2nd) =

Japanese daimyō and peer (1840–1897)

Prince Shimazu Tadayoshi Junior First Rank
- 島津 忠義
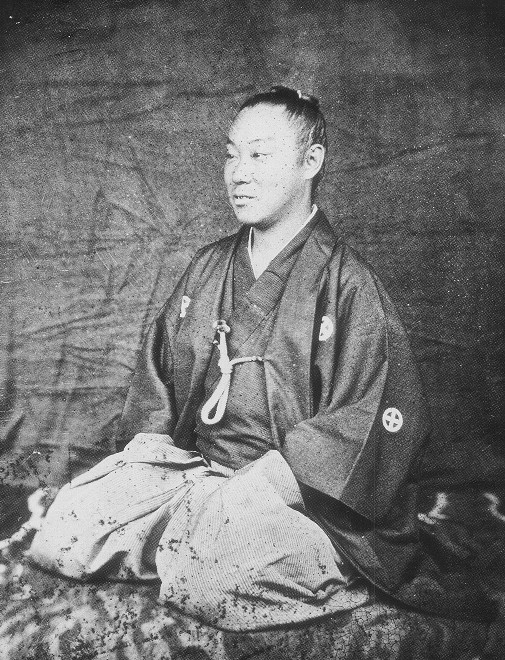
- Shimazu Tadayoshi

Daimyō of Satsuma
- In office 1858–1871
- Preceded by: Shimazu Nariakira
- Succeeded by: Position disestablished

Personal details
- Born: May 22, 1840
- Died: December 26, 1897 (aged 57)
- Spouse: Shimazu Teruko
- Awards: Junior First Rank

Prince Shimazu Tadayoshi (島津忠義; May 22, 1840 – December 26, 1897) was a Japanese daimyō of the late Edo period, who ruled the Satsuma Domain as its 12th and last daimyō until 1871. He succeeded his father, Hisamitsu, as the head of the Shimazu clan in 1887. In 1897, he fell ill and died, and was succeeded as the head of the family by his son, Shimazu Tadashige.

== Children ==
- Shimazu Tadashige (1886–1968)
- Chikako: married Prince Kuni Kuniyoshi and was mother of Empress Nagako.

== Ancestry ==
Ancestors of Shimazu Tadayoshi (2nd)

16. Shimazu Shigehide, 8th daimyō of Satsuma (1745–1833)
8. Shimazu Narinobu, 9th daimyō of Satsuma (1774–1841)
17. Tsutsumi Shunkōin (1747–1811)
4. Shimazu Narioki, 10th daimyō of Satsuma (1791–1859)
18. Suzuki Katsunori
9. Suzuki ...
2. Prince Shimazu Hisamitsu (1817–1887)
10. Okada Toshitake
5. Okada Yura (1795–1866)
1. Shimazu Tadayoshi
24. Shimazu Shigehide, 8th daimyō of Satsuma (1745–1833)
12. Shimazu Narinobu, 9th daimyō of Satsuma (1774–1841)
25. Tsutsumi Shunkōin (1747–1811)
6. Shimazu Tadakimi, daimyō of Shigetomi (1799–1872)
26. Suzuki Katsunori
13. Suzuki
3. Shimazu Chimoko (d. 1847)

Preceded by Shimazu Nariakira	Daimyō of Satsuma; 1858–1871	Succeeded by none
Preceded by Shimazu Nariakira	Shimazu family head 1858–1897	Succeeded by Shimazu Tadashige
