= Satsuma Domain =

Japanese historical feudal estate (1600–1871)

Kagoshima Domain (1869–1871) 鹿児島藩 Satsuma Domain (1600–1869) 薩摩藩
- Domain of Japan
- 1600–1871
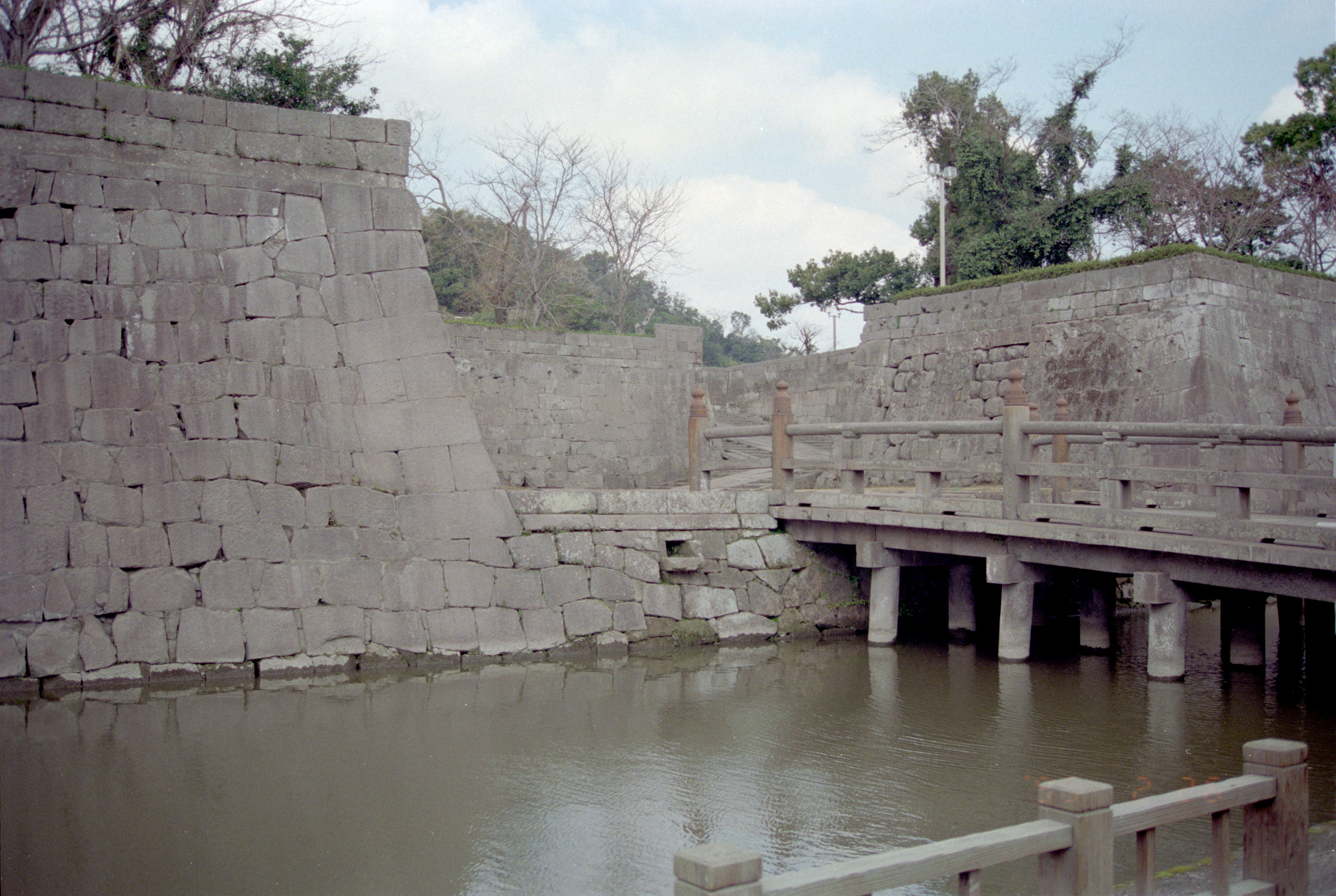
- Former site of Kagoshima Castle in Kagoshima

- Flag (Note: Flag used by the Satsuma army during the Boshin War from 1868 to 1869.) Mon of the Shimazu

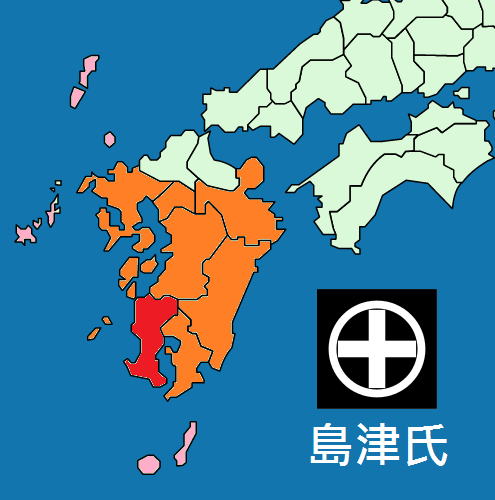
- Maximum extent of Satsuma Domain during the Sengoku period, 1586
- Capital: Kagoshima Castle
- Government
- Daimyō
  - 1602–1638: Shimazu Iehisa (first)
  - 1858–1871: Shimazu Tadayoshi (last)
- Historical era: Edo period
  - Established: 1600
  - Abolition of the han system: 1871
- Contained within
  - Province: Satsuma, Ōsumi, Hyūga
| Preceded by | Succeeded by |
| Satsuma Province; Ōsumi Province | Kagoshima Prefecture; Miyakojō Prefecture |
- Today part of: Whole: Kagoshima Prefecture; Kumamoto Prefecture; Miyazaki Prefecture; Partial: Fukuoka Prefecture; Oita Prefecture

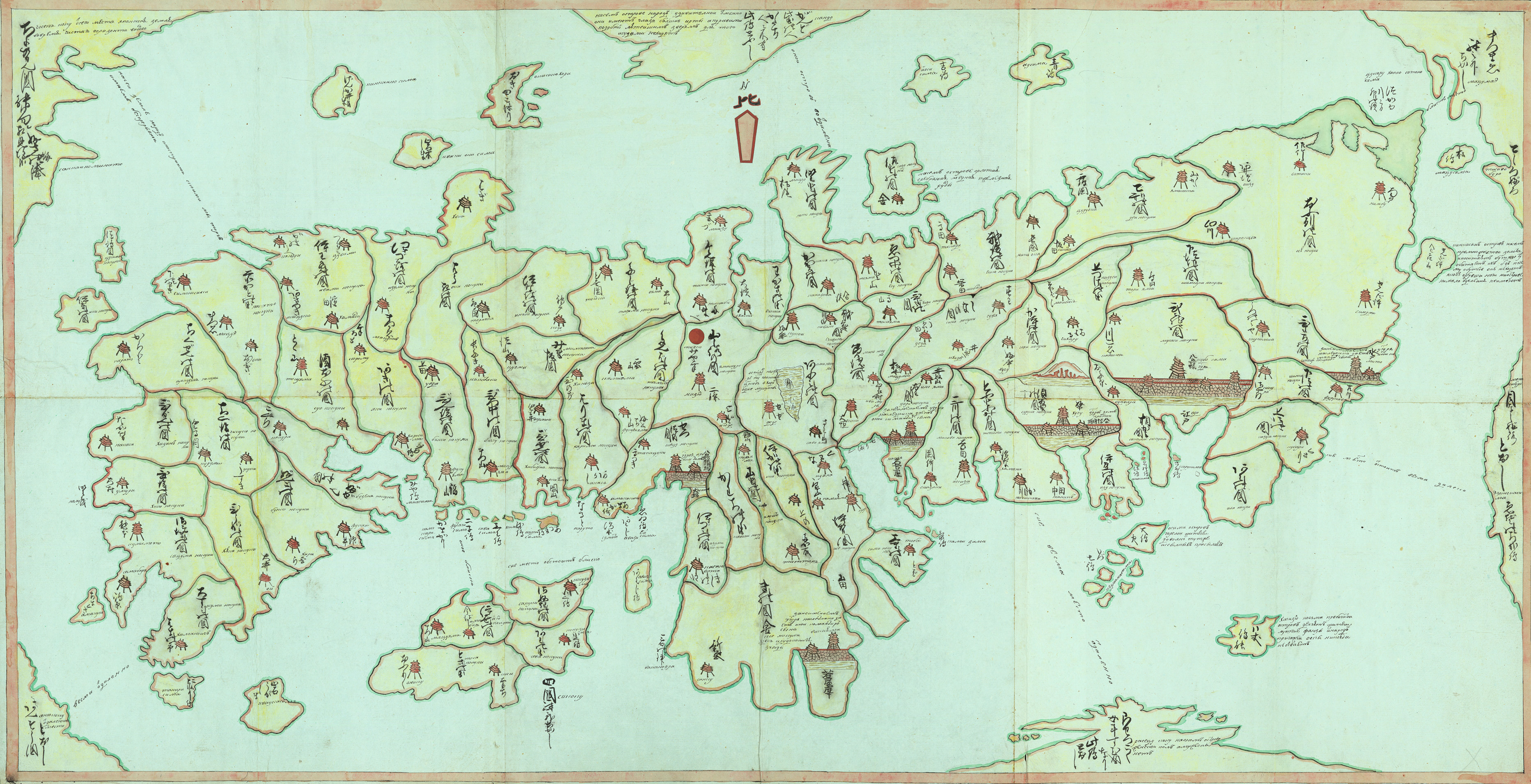
Map of Japan, 1789—the Han system affected cartography

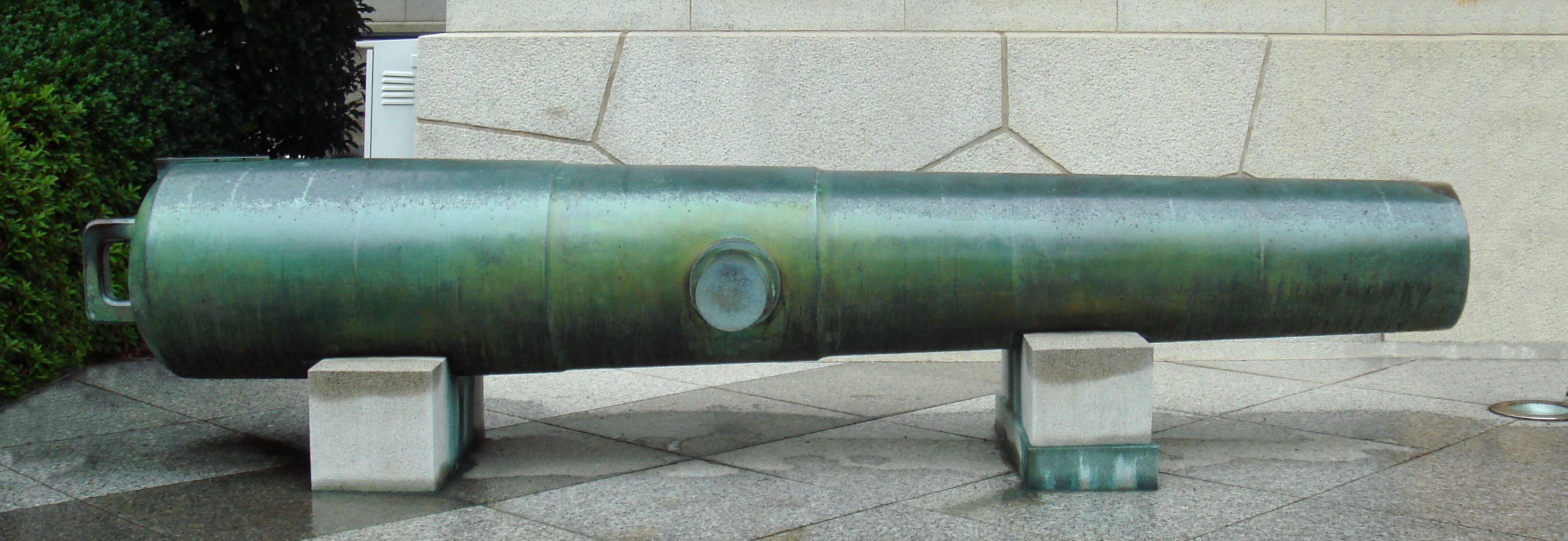
A 150-pound Satsuma cannon, cast in 1849. It was mounted on Fort Tenpozan at Kagoshima. Caliber: 290 mm, length: 4220 mm

The Satsuma Domain (薩摩藩, Satsuma-han Ryukyuan: Sachima-han), briefly known as the Kagoshima Domain (鹿児島藩, Kagoshima-han), was a domain (han) of the Tokugawa shogunate of Japan during the Edo period from 1600 to 1871.

The Satsuma Domain was based at Kagoshima Castle in Satsuma Province, the core of the modern city of Kagoshima, located in the south of the island of Kyushu. The Satsuma Domain was ruled for its existence by the Tozama daimyō of the Shimazu clan, who had ruled the Kagoshima area since the 1200s; it covered territory in the provinces of Satsuma, Ōsumi and Hyūga. The Satsuma Domain was assessed under the Kokudaka system and its value peaked at 770,000 koku, the second-highest domain in Japan after the Kaga Domain.

The Satsuma Domain was one of the most powerful and prominent of Japan's domains during the Edo period, conquering the Ryukyu Kingdom as a vassal state after the invasion of Ryukyu in 1609, and clashing with the British during the bombardment of Kagoshima in 1863 after the Namamugi Incident. The Satsuma Domain formed the Satchō Alliance with the rival Chōshū Domain during the Meiji Restoration and became instrumental in the establishment of the Empire of Japan. The Kagoshima-han was dissolved in the abolition of han and establishment of ken in 1871 by the Meiji government when Kagoshima-han became Kagoshima-ken, with some parts of the domain separated as part of Miyakonojō Prefecture (Miyakonojō-ken). The first prefectural governor of Kagoshima was Ōyama Tsunayoshi until 1877 when he was executed in the Satsuma Rebellion. Since the 1880s, the former territory of Kagoshima Domain is now part of Kagoshima and Miyazaki Prefecture which was ultimately split from Kagoshima in 1883.

== History ==
The Shimazu family controlled Satsuma province for roughly four centuries prior to the beginning of the Edo period. Despite being chastised by Toyotomi Hideyoshi in his 1587 Kyūshū campaign, and forced back to Satsuma, they remained one of the most powerful clans in the archipelago. During the decisive battle of Sekigahara in 1600, the Shimazu fought on the losing side. Satsuma was one of the most powerful feudal domains in Tokugawa Japan. It was controlled throughout the Edo period by the tozama daimyō of the Shimazu clan.

=== Ryukyu ===
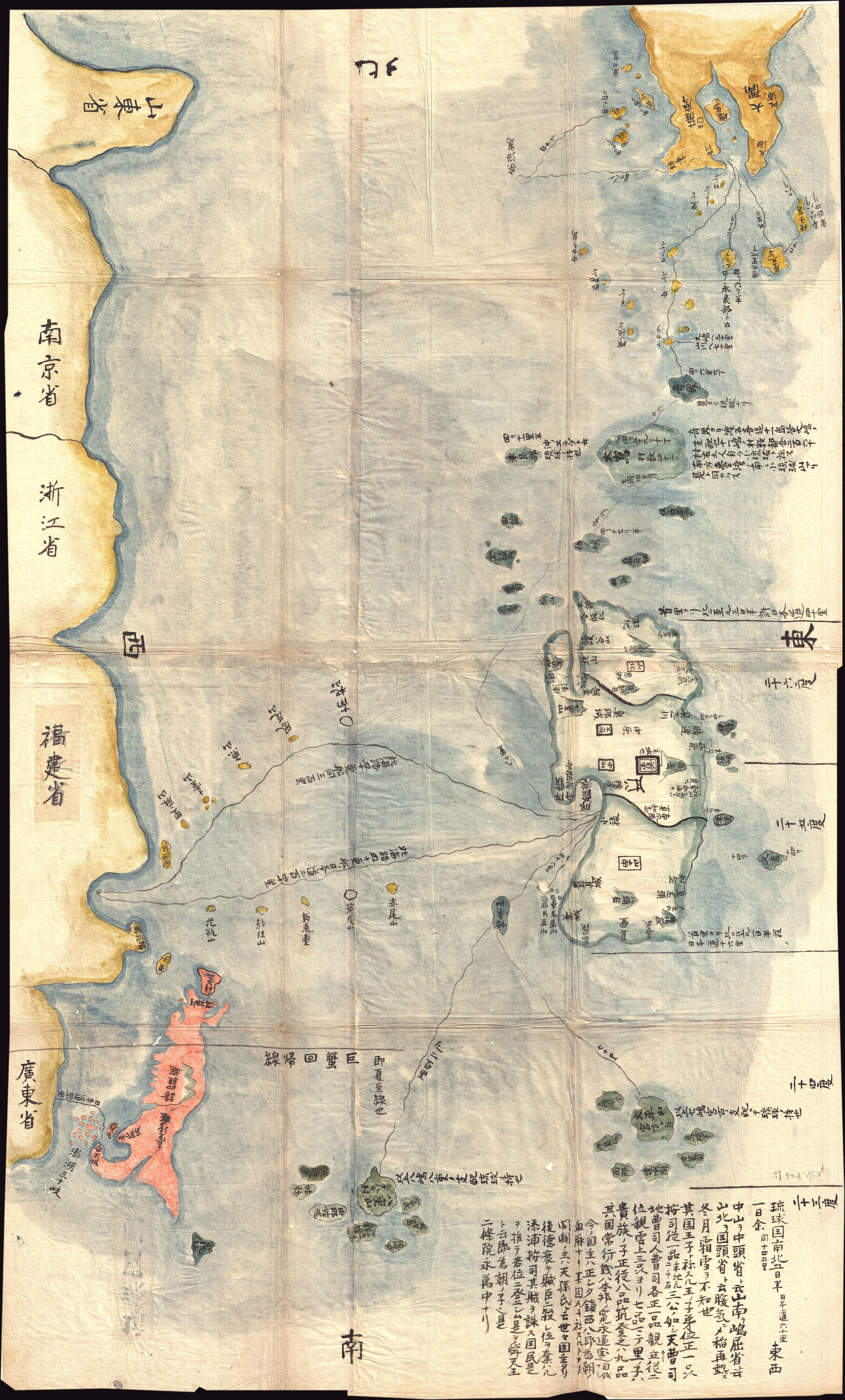
Map showing southern Kyushu and the Ryukyu Islands, 1781

Since the mid-15th century, Satsuma fought with the Ryukyu Kingdom for control of the Northern Ryukyu Islands, which lie southwest of Japan. In 1609, Shimazu Iehisa requested permission from the shogunate to invade Ryukyu. After a three-month war which met stiff resistance, Satsuma captured the Ryukyuan capital of Shuri and King Shō Nei. In the ensuing peace treaty, Satsuma annexed the Amami and Tokara Islands, demanded tribute, and forced the King and his descendants to pledge loyalty to Satsuma's daimyō.

For the remainder of the Edo period, Satsuma influenced their politics and dominated their trading policies to take advantage of Ryukyu's tributary status with China. As strict maritime prohibitions were imposed upon much of Japan beginning in the 1630s, Satsuma's ability to enjoy a trade in Chinese goods, and information, via Ryukyu, provided it a distinct and important, if not entirely unique, role in the overall economy and politics of the Tokugawa state. The degree of economic benefits enjoyed by Satsuma, and the degree of their influence in Ryukyu, are subjects debated by scholars, but the political prestige and influence gained through this relationship is not questioned. The Shimazu continually made efforts to emphasize their unique position as the only feudal domain to claim an entire foreign kingdom as its vassal, and engineered repeated increases to their own official Court rank, in the name of maintaining their power and prestige in the eyes of Ryukyu.

In 1871, however, Emperor Meiji abolished the han system, and the following year informed King Shō Tai that he was designated "Domain Head of Ryukyu Domain", transferring Satsuma's authority over the country to Tokyo.

=== Edo period ===
Though not the wealthiest han in terms of kokudaka (the official measure of the wealth and therefore power of a han, measured in koku), Satsuma remained among the wealthiest and most powerful domains throughout the Edo period. This derived not only from their connection to Ryukyu, but also from the size and productive wealth of Satsuma province itself, and from their extreme distance from Edo, and thus from the shōgun's armies.

The Shimazu exercised their influence to exact from the shogunate a number of special exceptions. Satsuma was granted an exception to the shogunate's limit of one castle per domain, a policy which was meant to restrict the military strength of the domains; the Shimazu then formed sub-fiefs within their domain, and doled out castles to their vassals, administering the domain in a manner not unlike a mini-shogunate. They also received special exceptions from the shogunate in regard to the policy of sankin-kōtai, another policy meant to restrict the wealth and power of the daimyō. Under this policy, every feudal lord was mandated to travel to Edo at least once a year, and to spend some portion of the year there, away from his domain and his power base. The Shimazu were granted permission to make this journey only once every two years. These exceptions thus allowed Satsuma to gain even more power and wealth relative to the majority of other domains.

Though arguably opposed to the shogunate, Satsuma was perhaps one of the strictest domains in enforcing particular policies. Christian missionaries were seen as a serious threat to the power of the daimyō, and the peace and order of the domain; the shogunal ban on Christianity was enforced more strictly and brutally in Satsuma, perhaps, than anywhere else in the archipelago. The ban on smuggling, perhaps unsurprisingly, was not so strictly enforced, as the domain gained significantly from trade performed along its shores, some ways away from Nagasaki, where the shogunate monopolized commerce. In the 1830s, Satsuma used its illegal Okinawa trade to rebuild its finances under Zusho Hirosato.

=== Bakumatsu ===
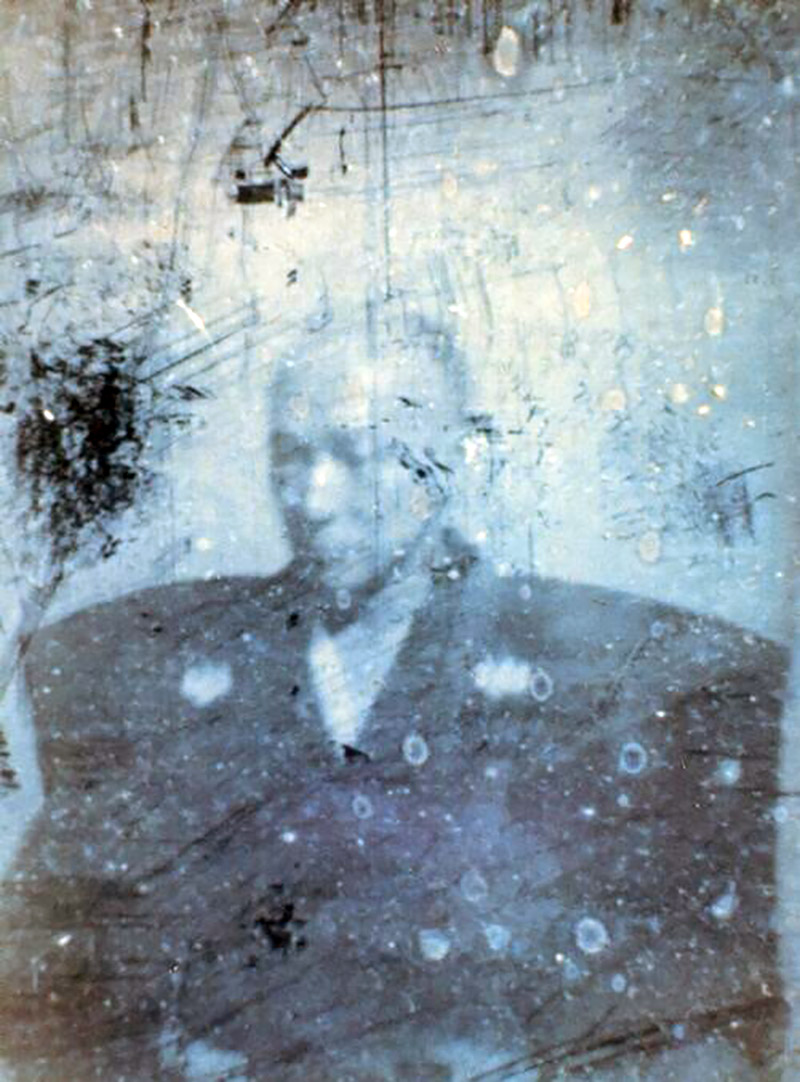
A daguerreotype of Shimazu Nariakira

The Satsuma daimyō of the 1850s, Shimazu Nariakira, was very interested in Western thought and technology, and sought to open the country. At the time, contacts with Westerners increased dramatically, particularly for Satsuma, as Western ships frequently landed in the Ryukyus and sought not only trade, but formal diplomatic relations. To increase his influence in the shogunate, Nariakira engineered a marriage between Shōgun Tokugawa Iesada and his adopted daughter, Atsu-hime (later Tenshō-in).

In 1854, the first year of Iesada's reign, Commodore Perry landed in Japan and forced an end to the isolation policy of the shogunate. However, the treaties signed between Japan and the western powers, particularly the Harris Treaty of 1858, put Japan at a serious disadvantage. In the same year, both Iesada and Nariakira died. Nariakira named his nephew, Shimazu Tadayoshi, as his successor. As Tadayoshi was still a child, his father, Shimazu Hisamitsu, effectively held the power in Satsuma.

Hisamitsu followed a policy of Kōbu gattai, or "unity between the shogunate and the imperial court". The marriage between Tokugawa Iemochi, the next shōgun, and imperial princess Kazunomiya was a major success for this faction. However, this put Satsuma at odds with the more radical Sonnō jōi, or "revere the Emperor and repel the barbarians" faction, with Chōshū as the major supporter.

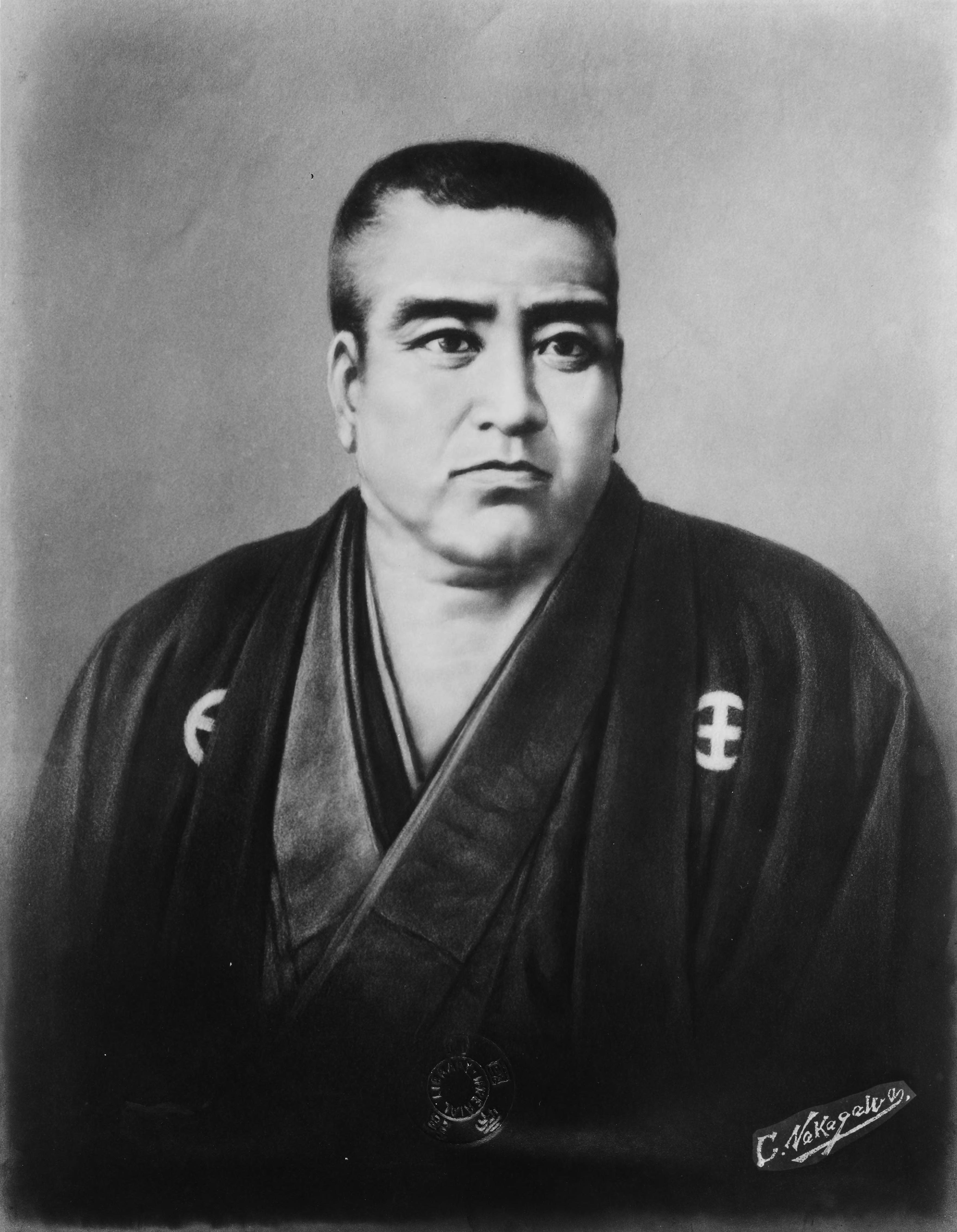
Saigō Takamori, the last great warrior of the Satsuma, was one of the zealous supporters of the imperial restoration, but ended up leading the rebellion against the imperial government in 1877 that culminated in the destruction of the Satsuma clan and the end of the vestiges of feudal Japan's daimyos.

In 1862, in the Namamugi Incident an Englishman was killed by retainers of Satsuma, leading to the bombardment of Kagoshima by the Royal Navy the following year. Even though Satsuma was able to withstand the attack, this event showed how necessary it was for Japan to import western technology and reform its military.

Meanwhile, the focus of Japanese politics shifted to Kyoto, where the major struggles of the time occurred. The shogunate entrusted Satsuma and Aizu with the protection of the Imperial court, against attempts of the Sonnō jōi faction to take over, as in the Kinmon Incident of 1864. The shogunate decided to punish Chōshū for this event with the First Chōshū expedition, under the leadership of a Satsuma retainer, Saigō Takamori. Saigō, however, avoided a military conflict and allowed Chōshū to resolve the issue with the Seppuku of the three perpetrators behind the attack on the Imperial palace.

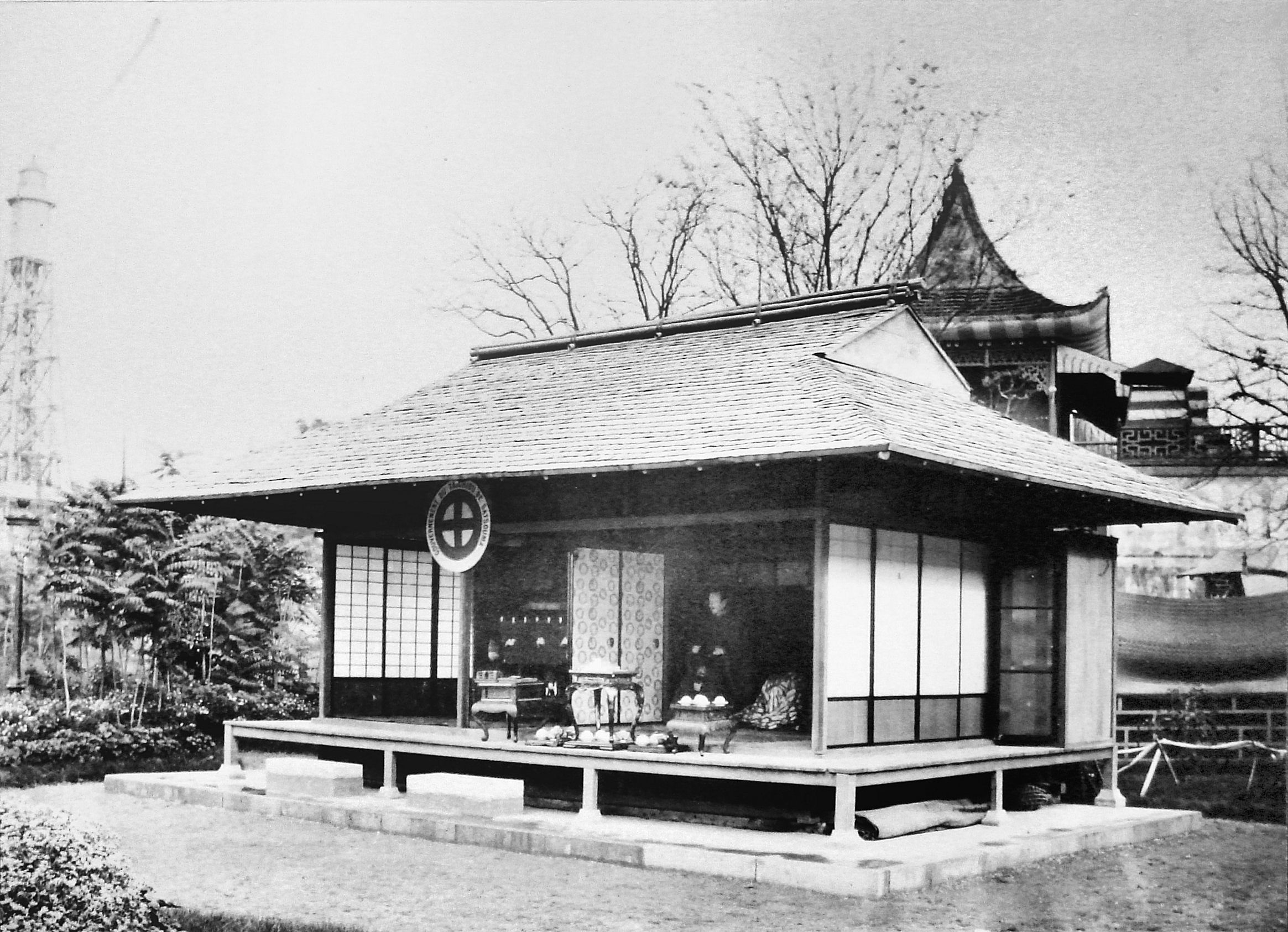
Pavilion of the "Government of Satsuma" at the Exposition Universelle in 1867 in Paris

When the shogunate decided to finally defeat Chōshū in a Second Chōshū expedition the next year, Satsuma, under the lead of Saigo Takamori and Ōkubo Toshimichi, decided to switch sides. The Satchō Alliance between Satsuma and Chōshū was brokered by Sakamoto Ryōma from Tosa.

This second expedition ended in a disaster for the shogunate. It was defeated on the battlefield, and Shōgun Iemochi died of illness in Osaka Castle. The next shōgun, Tokugawa Yoshinobu, brokered a cease fire.

Despite attempts by the new shōgun to reform the government, he was unable to contain the growing movement to overthrow the shogunate led by Satsuma and Chōshū. Even after he stepped down as shōgun and agreed to return the power to the Imperial court, the two sides finally clashed in the Battle of Toba–Fushimi 1868. The shōgun, defeated, escaped to Edo. Saigo Takamori then led his troops to Edo, where Tenshō-in was instrumental in the bloodless surrender of Edo castle. The Boshin War continued until the last of the shogunate forces were defeated in 1869.

=== Meiji period ===
The Meiji government, which was established in the aftermath of these events, was largely dominated by politicians from Satsuma and Chōshū. Though the samurai class, domain system, and much of the political and social structures surrounding these were abolished shortly afterwards. The Satsuma rebelled against the imperial government in 1877 as their authority withered, culminating in the destruction of hereditary rule in Japan. Figures from these two areas dominated the Japanese government roughly until World War I.

However, the beginning of the period was marked by growing discontent of the former samurai class, which erupted in the Satsuma Rebellion under Saigo Takamori in 1877.

== List of daimyōs ==
The hereditary daimyōs were head of the clan and head of the domain.

Shimazu clan 1602–1871 (Tozama; 770,000 koku)

| | Name | Tenure |
|---|---|---|
| 1 | Shimazu Iehisa (島津家久) | 1602–1638 |
| 2 | Shimazu Mitsuhisa (島津光久) | 1638–1687 |
| 3 | Shimazu Tsunataka (島津綱貴) | 1687–1704 |
| 4 | Shimazu Yoshitaka (島津吉貴) | 1704–1721 |
| 5 | Shimazu Tsugutoyo (島津継豊) | 1721–1746 |
| 6 | Shimazu Munenobu (島津宗信) | 1746–1749 |
| 7 | Shimazu Shigetoshi (島津重年) | 1749–1755 |
| 8 | Shimazu Shigehide (島津重豪) | 1755–1787 |
| 9 | Shimazu Narinobu (島津斉宣) | 1787–1809 |
| 10 | Shimazu Narioki (島津斉興) | 1809–1851 |
| 11 | Shimazu Nariakira (島津斉彬) | 1851–1858 |
| 12 | Shimazu Tadayoshi (島津忠義) | 1858–1871 |

== Other major figures from Satsuma ==
Sengoku period

- Shimazu Yoshihiro
- Niiro Tadamoto

Bakumatsu period

- Saigō Takamori
- Ōkubo Toshimichi
- Komatsu Tatewaki
- Tenshōin, official wife of shogun Tokugawa Iesada

Satsuma Rebellion

- Beppu Shinsuke
- Kirino Toshiaki

Meiji period statesmen and diplomats

- Kuroda Kiyotaka, 2nd Prime Minister of Japan
- Matsukata Masayoshi, 4th and 6th Prime Minister
- Yamamoto Gonnohyōe, 22nd Prime Minister
- Mori Arinori
- Makino Nobuaki
- Nishi Tokujirō
- Terashima Munenori
- Saigō Tsugumichi, younger brother of Saigo Takamori
- Mishima Michitsune
- Narahara Shigeru

Imperial Japanese Navy

- Tōgō Heihachirō
- Saneyoshi Yasuzumi
- Kawamura Sumiyoshi
- Kataoka Shichirō
- Shibayama Yahachi
- Takeshita Isamu
- Nire Kagenori
- Kamimura Hikonojō
- Ijuin Gorō
- Itō Sukeyuki
- Inoue Yoshika
- Kabayama Sukenori, 1st Governor-General of Taiwan
- Samejima Kazunori, president of the Naval War College, Admiral and baron.

Imperial Japanese Army

- Uehara Yūsaku
- Nozu Michitsura, field marshal
- Ōyama Iwao, field marshal
- Kawamura Kageaki, field marshal
- Kawakami Soroku
- Takashima Tomonosuke

Artists

- Kuroda Seiki, yōga painter

Entrepreneurs

- Godai Tomoatsu

== See also ==
- Abolition of the han system
- History of Kagoshima Prefecture
- List of han
- Museum of the Meiji Restoration
