= Shimazu Hisamitsu =

Japanese samurai

Prince Shimazu Hisamitsu
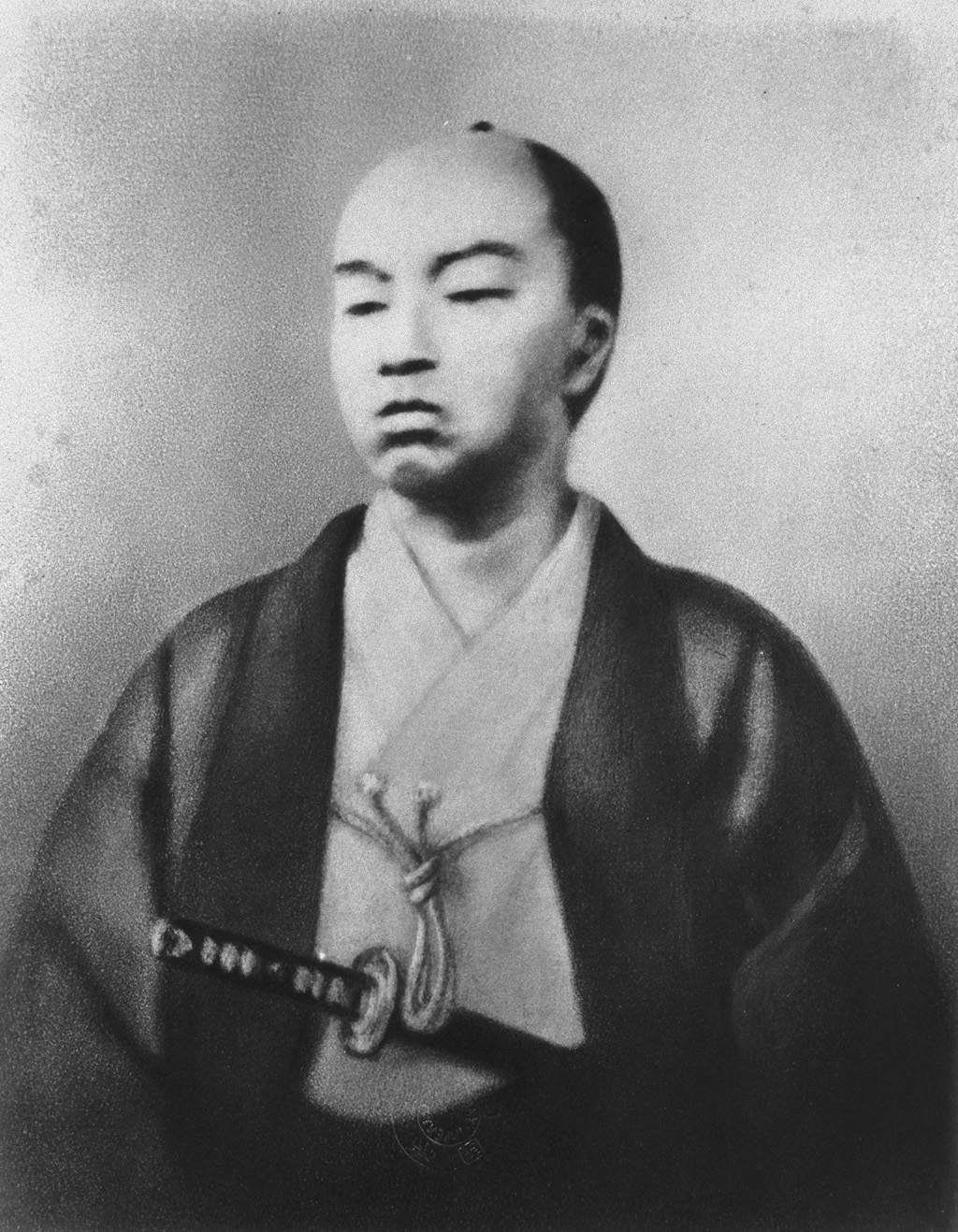
- Born: November 28, 1817
- Died: December 6, 1887 (aged 70)
- Conflicts: Namamugi Incident

Prince Shimazu Hisamitsu (島津 久光; November 28, 1817 – December 6, 1887), also known as Shimazu Saburō (島津 三郎), was a Japanese samurai of the late Edo period. The younger brother of Shimazu Nariakira, Hisamitsu was the virtual sovereign and strongman of Satsuma Domain while serving as regent for his underage son Tadayoshi, who became the 12th and last daimyō of Satsuma Domain. Hisamitsu was instrumental in the efforts of the southern Satsuma, Chōshū, and Tosa clans to bring down the Tokugawa Shogunate. He held the court title of Ōsumi no Kami (大隈守).

== Biography ==
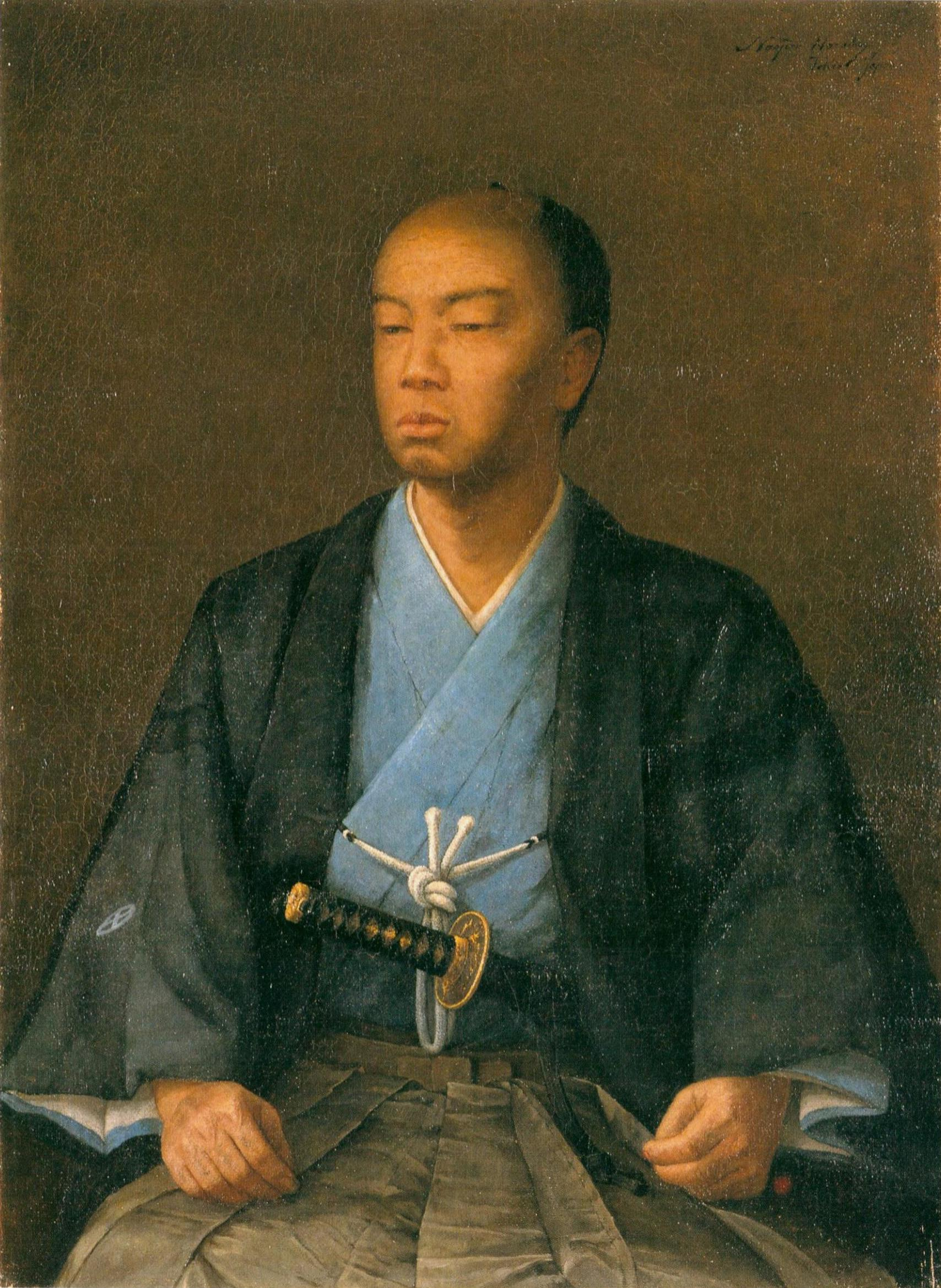
Portrait by Harada Naojirō.

Hisamitsu was born in Kagoshima Castle in 1817, the son of Shimazu Narioki, the 10th daimyō; Hisamitsu's name at birth was Kanenoshin; his mother was Yura, Narioki's concubine. He was briefly adopted by the Tanegashima clan as an heir, but was returned to the Shimazu family while still a child. At age eight, he was adopted into the Shigetomi-Shimazu, a branch family of the main Shimazu house. Kanenoshin, now named Matajirō, came of age in 1828, and took the adult name Tadayuki (忠教).

At age 22, following his marriage to the daughter of the previous Shigetomi lord, Tadakimi, he inherited family headship. He was supported as a candidate for succession to the main Shimazu house during the Oyura Disturbance (お由羅騒動, Oyura sōdō). His half-brother Nariakira won the dispute and succeeded their father as lord of Satsuma; however, following Nariakira's death in 1858, Tadayuki's young son Mochihisa (later known as Tadayoshi) was chosen as the next lord of Satsuma. Tadayuki gained a position of primacy in Satsuma, due to his status as the lord's father. He returned to the main Shimazu house in 1861, and it was then that he changed his name to Hisamitsu.

In 1862, Hisamitsu went to Kyoto, and took part in the increasingly Kyoto-centered politics of the 1860s; he was a part of the kōbu-gattai political faction. It was during Hisamitsu's return from a stay in Edo, when three Englishmen on horseback offended his retainers by refusing to dismount or stand aside. Their failure to observe proper etiquette resulted in some argument, a chase, and one was killed, in what came to be known as the Namamugi Incident. Hisamitsu remained at the core of the kōbu-gattai movement in Kyoto, until Satsuma's secret alliance with men of Chōshu. He supported the Satsuma domain's military actions in the Boshin War, and retired soon after the Meiji Restoration. In the Meiji era, he was given the rank of duke (kōshaku (公爵)), the highest of the newly created kazoku nobility and which was awarded for his clan's participation during the Restoration. After this, the government struggled with the treatment of Hisamitsu, but treated him with the highest class in ordination, honours, and conferrals.

The government was careful about Hisamitsu, but that too disappeared after the deaths of Saigo and Okubo. It is said that Hisamitsu continued to say until the end, "Saigo was deceived by Okubo."

=== After the Meiji Restoration ===
After the Meiji Restoration, Hisamitsu continued to hold real power in the Satsuma Domain (Kagoshima Domain). In the 4th year of Meiji (1871), the imperial government officials led by Saigo Takamori and Okubo Toshimichi, who held government positions, issued an order to abolish the domains, which angered Hisamitsu in Kagoshima, and set off fireworks for an entire day in protest. In the old daimyo, Hisamitsu was the only one who was dissatisfied with the abolition of the domain. The "conspiracy of Choshu" was also outraged by the setting of the capital. In September of the same year, the separation family was created Tamagi Shimazu house。

In Meiji 6 (1873), he served as a cabinet adviser to the government. For 7 years, he served as Minister of left and proposed to restore old customs, but he was completely excluded from the government's policy decision.

In the 8th year of Meiji (1875), he resigned as Minister of left and lived a secluded life in Kagoshima, concentrating on compiling and collecting the history books handed down by the Shimazu family.

== Death ==
Hisamitsu died on December 6, 1887, at age 70. He was accorded a state funeral.

He is buried in Kagoshima Prefecture.

== Honours ==
- Grand Cordon of the Order of the Rising Sun (15 July 1881)
- Prince (7 July 1884)
- Grand Cordon of the Order of the Chrysanthemum (5 November 1887)

=== Order of precedence ===
- Junior fourth rank (March 1864)
- Fourth rank (16 May 1864)
- Third rank (Sixth day, third month of the second year of Meiji (1869))
- Second rank (13th day, ninth month of the fourth year of Meiji (1871))
- Senior second rank (17 June 1879)
- Junior first rank (21 September 1887)

== Published works ==
- Shimazu Hisamitsu rireki 島津久光履歴.
- Shimazu Hisamitsu-kō jikki 島津久光公実紀 (1977). Tokyo: Tokyo Daigaku Shuppankai 東京大学出版会. (published posthumously)

== Family tree ==
Oyura	Shimazu Narioki	Iyohime	Tokugawa Nariatsu
Hisamitsu	Nariakira	Tsunehime
Saigō Takamori	Tadayoshi
Umajirō	Konoe Fumimaro	Tadashige	Chikako	Prince Kuni Kuniyoshi
Ryūichi	Akiko	Tadahide	Empress Kōjun	Emperor Hirohito
Izuko	Nobuhisa	Emperor Akihito	Empress Michiko
Tadahiro	The Present Emperor

== Ancestry ==
The below are the ancestors of Shimazu Hisamitsu:

Ancestors of Shimazu Hisamitsu

8. Shimazu Shigehide, 8th Lord of Satsuma (1745-1833)
4. Shimazu Narinobu, 9th Lord of Satsuma (1774-1841)
9. Tsutsumi Shunkōin (1747-1811)
2. Shimazu Narioki, 10th Lord of Satsuma (1791-1859)
10. Suzuki Katsunori
5. Suzuki
1. Prince Shimazu Hisamitsu
6. Okada Toshitake
3. Okada Yura (1795-1866)

== Works dealing with Hisamitsu ==
- NHK Taiga Drama
  - Atsuhime (2008) Played by: Yuichiro Yamaguchi

== See also ==
- Shimazu family
- Namamugi Incident
