= Shimazu Narioki =

Japanese feudal lord (daimyo) of the Edo period

- 島津斉興
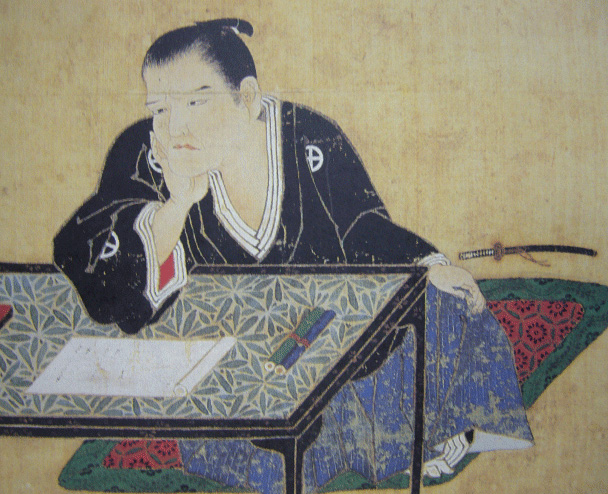
- Shimazu Narioki

Head of Shimazu clan
- In office 1809–1851
- Preceded by: Shimazu Narinobu
- Succeeded by: Shimazu Nariakira

Lord of Satsuma Domain
- In office 1809–1851
- Succeeded by: Shimazu Nariakira

Personal details
- Born: 1 December 1791
- Died: 7 October 1859 (aged 67)
- Parents: Shimazu Yoshinobu (father); Suzuki Katsunao's daughter (mother)

Military service
- Rank: Daimyo

Shimazu Narioki (島津 斉興; 1 December 1791 – 7 October 1859) was a Japanese feudal lord (daimyō) of the Edo period, the 27th in the line of Shimazu clan lords of Satsuma Domain (r. 1809–1851). Shimazu was the overseer of the Tenpō Reforms under Zusho Hirosato and an initiator of the Kaei purge. He was the father of Shimazu Nariakira, Shimazu Hisamitsu and Ikeda Naritoshi (1811–1842).

== Biography ==
He was born in Edo on November 6, 1791, as the eldest son of the Shimazu Yoshinobu . Because of his birth mother's family, the Suzuki clan were ronin and a dispute arose between the Shimazu clan and the Suzuki clan after Nariaki was born.

In October 1804, during the Genpuku era, he was given an epithet by Tokugawa Ienari, and changed his name from Tadayoshi/Tadaharu/Tadaatsu to Saioki. He was appointed as Junior Fourth Rank Lower, Chamberlain and Bungonokami.

In June 1809, his father, Yoshinobu, was forced into retirement by his grandfather, Shimazu Shigego, in order to take responsibility for the collapse of the Kinshiroku, so he took over the headship of the clan and became the 10th lord of the domain. However, even though he became the lord of the domain, the real power such as reforming the domain's administration remained in the hands of heavyweights.

In 1833, when Shigego died at the age of 89, he took over the domain's administration, and appointed Chosho Hirosato, who had been a key figure in reforming the domain to lead Satsuma, which focused on fiscal reform. He worked on the Tenpo reform of the domain. Under the leadership of the Census Bureau, the administrative reforms of the domain had great effects, such as paying debts in 250-year installments, smuggling trade with the Qing Dynasty, monopolizing sugar, and making counterfeit money, and the finances of the Satsuma domain quickly recovered.

== Oyura Riot ==
There was a dispute within the domain over the successor to Saiki. Nariaki's adult son had a legitimate son from his legal wife, Yahime (Shuko) (daughter of Ikeda Harumichi, lord of the Tottori Domain), and a fifth son, Hisamitsu, with his concubine, Oyura. (His second son, Saitoshi, inherited the clan). Originally, his eldest son was supposed to succeed him, but Nariaki was against Oyura and Hisamitsu. However, there were many people within the domain who recommended the intelligent Nariakira as his successor, and in December 1849, a clan riot (Oyura Riot) broke out. This was a plot to assassinate Hisamitsu and his mother, Oyura, against whom more than 50 people, including Yamada Seiyasu, Takasaki Goroemon, and Konda Ryuzaemon, wanted to support Takasaki Nariakira, but the plan was not planned in advance. Then, he was forced to commit suicide. After that, the domain was divided and conflicts continued. In February 1851, Shimazu Nariaki retired.

== Death ==
Shimazu Nariakira canceled his planned military expedition to Kyoto and refused to protect Gessho, who had fled from Kyoto to Satsuma during the Ansei era, he hid Saigo Takamori's identity on Amami Oshima, and informed the shogunate of Saigo's death. He also carried out restoration policies such as ordering the reduction of the Shuseikan, but died of illness on September 12, 1859.

Preceded by Shimazu Narinobu	Daimyō of Satsuma; 1809–1851	Succeeded by Shimazu Nariakira
