= Edo Castle =

Historic 15th-century palace in Chiyoda, Tokyo, Japan

Coordinates: 35°41′18″N 139°45′16″E

Edo Castle 江戸城
- Chiyoda, Tokyo, Japan
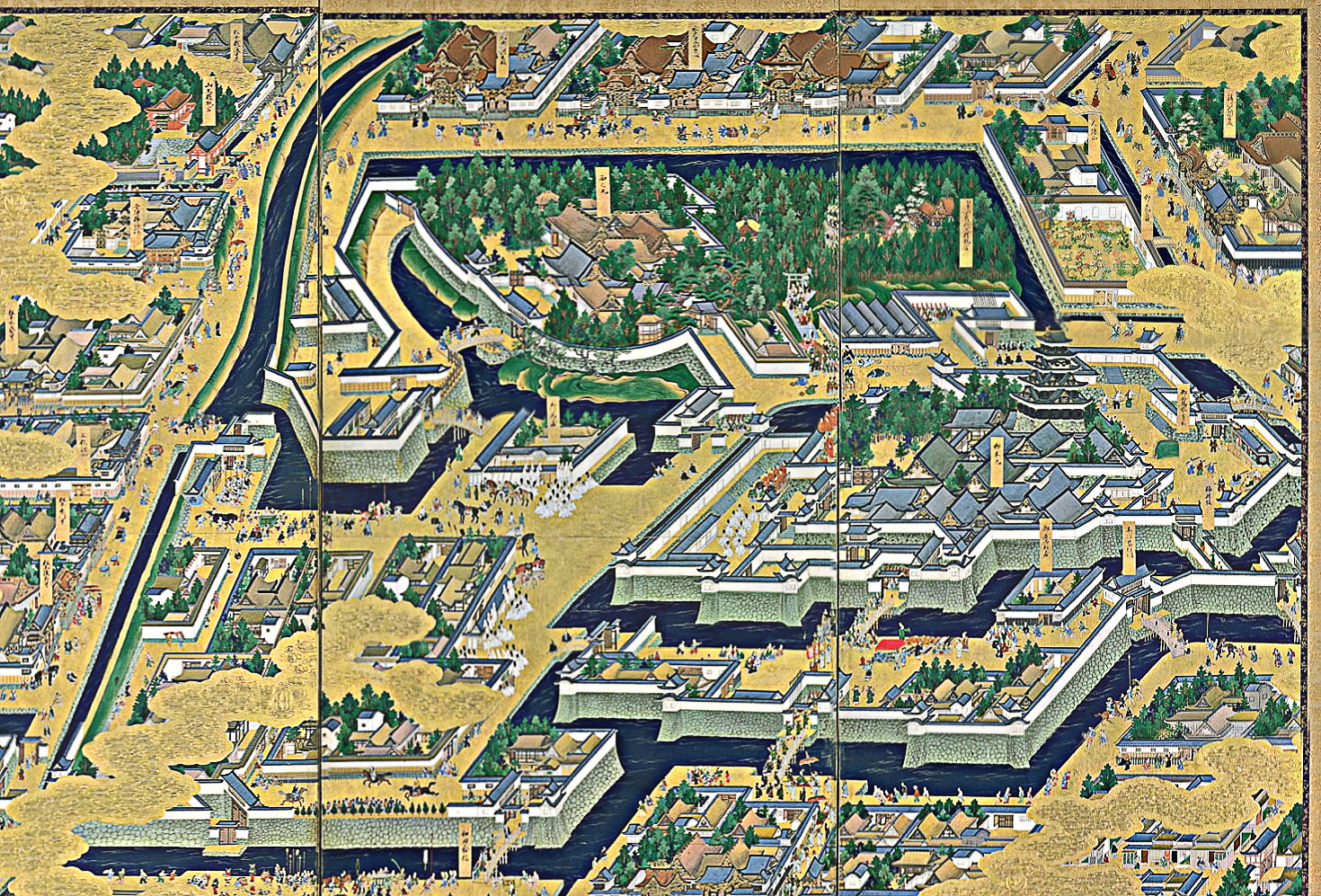
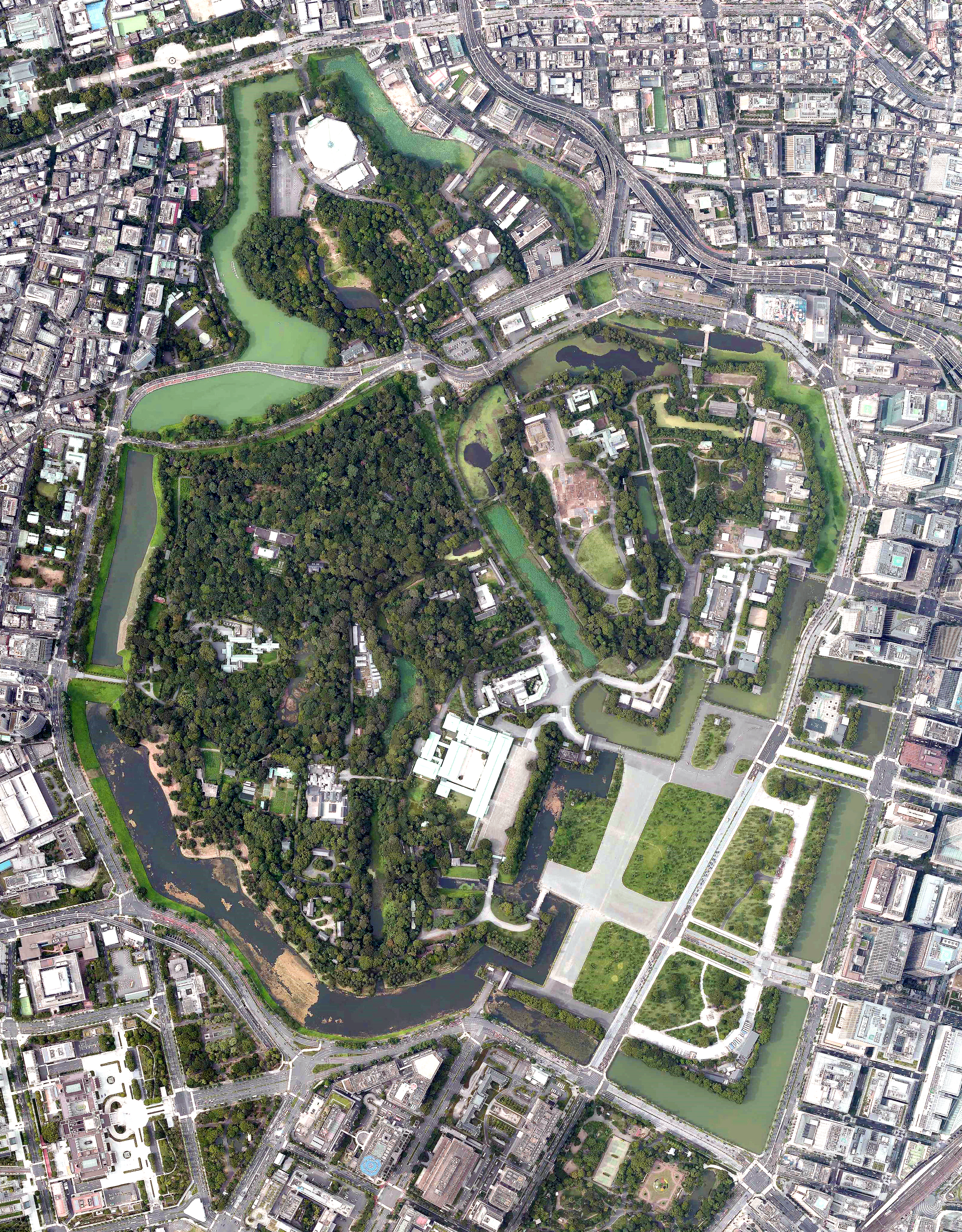
- Edo Castle with surrounding residential palaces and moats, from a 17th-century screen painting. Aerial view of the inner grounds of Edo Castle, today the location of Tokyo Imperial Palace

Site information
- Type: Flatland
- Owner: Imperial Household Agency
- Condition: Mostly ruins, parts reconstructed after World War II. Site today of Tokyo Imperial Palace.

Site history
- Built: 1457
- Built by: Ōta Dōkan, Tokugawa Ieyasu
- In use: 1457–present (as Tokyo Imperial Palace)
- Materials: granite stone, earthwork, wood
- Demolished: The tenshu (keep) was destroyed by fire in 1657, most of the rest was destroyed by another major fire on 5 May 1873. In use as Tokyo Imperial Palace.

Garrison information
- Occupants: Tokugawa shōguns, Japanese emperors and imperial family since the Meiji era

Edo Castle (江戸城, Edo-jō) is a flatland castle that was built in 1457 by Ōta Dōkan in Edo, Toshima District, Musashi Province. In modern times it is part of the Tokyo Imperial Palace in Chiyoda, Tokyo, and is therefore also known as Chiyoda Castle (千代田城, Chiyoda-jō). Tokugawa Ieyasu established the Tokugawa shogunate there, and it was the residence of the shōgun and the headquarters of the military government during the Edo period (1603–1867) in Japanese history. After the resignation of the shōgun and the Meiji Restoration, it became the Tokyo Imperial Palace. Some moats, walls and ramparts of the castle survive to this day. However, the grounds were more extensive during the Edo period, with Tokyo Station and the Marunouchi section of the city lying within the outermost moat. It also encompassed Kitanomaru Park, the Nippon Budokan Hall and other current landmarks of the surrounding area.

== History ==
Map of Edo Castle grounds around 1849 (click to see legend) 1) Ōoku 2) Naka-Oku 3) Omote 4) Ninomaru-Goten 5) Ninomaru 6) Momiji-yama 7) Nishinomaru 8) Fukiage 9) Kitanomaru 10) Unknown 11) Sannomaru 12) Nishinomaru-shita 13) Ōte-mae 14) Daimyō-Kōji

The warrior Edo Shigetsugu built his residence in what is now the Honmaru and Ninomaru part of Edo Castle, around the end of the Heian period (794–1185) or beginning of the Kamakura period (1185–1333). The Edo clan left in the 15th century as a result of uprisings in the Kantō region, and Ōta Dōkan, a retainer of the Ogigayatsu Uesugi family, built Edo Castle in 1457.

The castle came under the control of the Later Hōjō clan in 1524 after the Siege of Edo. The castle was vacated in 1590 due to the Siege of Odawara. Tokugawa Ieyasu made Edo Castle his base after he was offered eight eastern provinces by Toyotomi Hideyoshi. He later defeated Toyotomi Hideyori, son of Hideyoshi, at the Siege of Osaka in 1615, and emerged as the political leader of Japan. Tokugawa Ieyasu received the title of Sei-i Taishōgun in 1603, and Edo became the center of Tokugawa's administration.

Initially, parts of the area were lying under water. The sea reached the present Nishinomaru area of Edo Castle, and Hibiya was a beach. The landscape was changed for the construction of the castle. Most construction started in 1593 and was completed in 1636 under Ieyasu's grandson, Tokugawa Iemitsu. By this time, Edo had a population of 150,000.

The existing Honmaru, Ninomaru, and Sannomaru areas were extended with the addition of the Nishinomaru, Nishinomaru-shita, Fukiage, and Kitanomaru areas. The perimeter measured 16 km.

The shōgun required the daimyōs to supply building materials or finances, a method shogunates used to keep the powers of the daimyōs in check. Large granite stones were moved from afar; the size and number of the stones depended on the wealth of the daimyōs. The wealthier ones had to contribute more. Those who did not supply stones were required to contribute labor for such tasks as digging the large moats and flattening hills. The earth that was taken from the moats was used as landfill for sea-reclamation or to level the ground. Thus the construction of Edo Castle laid the foundation for parts of the city where merchants were able to settle.

At least 10,000 men were involved in the first phase of the construction and more than 300,000 in the middle phase. When construction ended, the castle had 38 gates. The ramparts were almost 20 meters (66 ft) high and the outer walls were 12 meters (39 ft) high. Moats forming roughly concentric circles were dug for further protection. Some moats reached as far as Ichigaya and Yotsuya, and parts of the ramparts survive to this day. This area is bordered by either the sea or the Kanda River, allowing ships access.

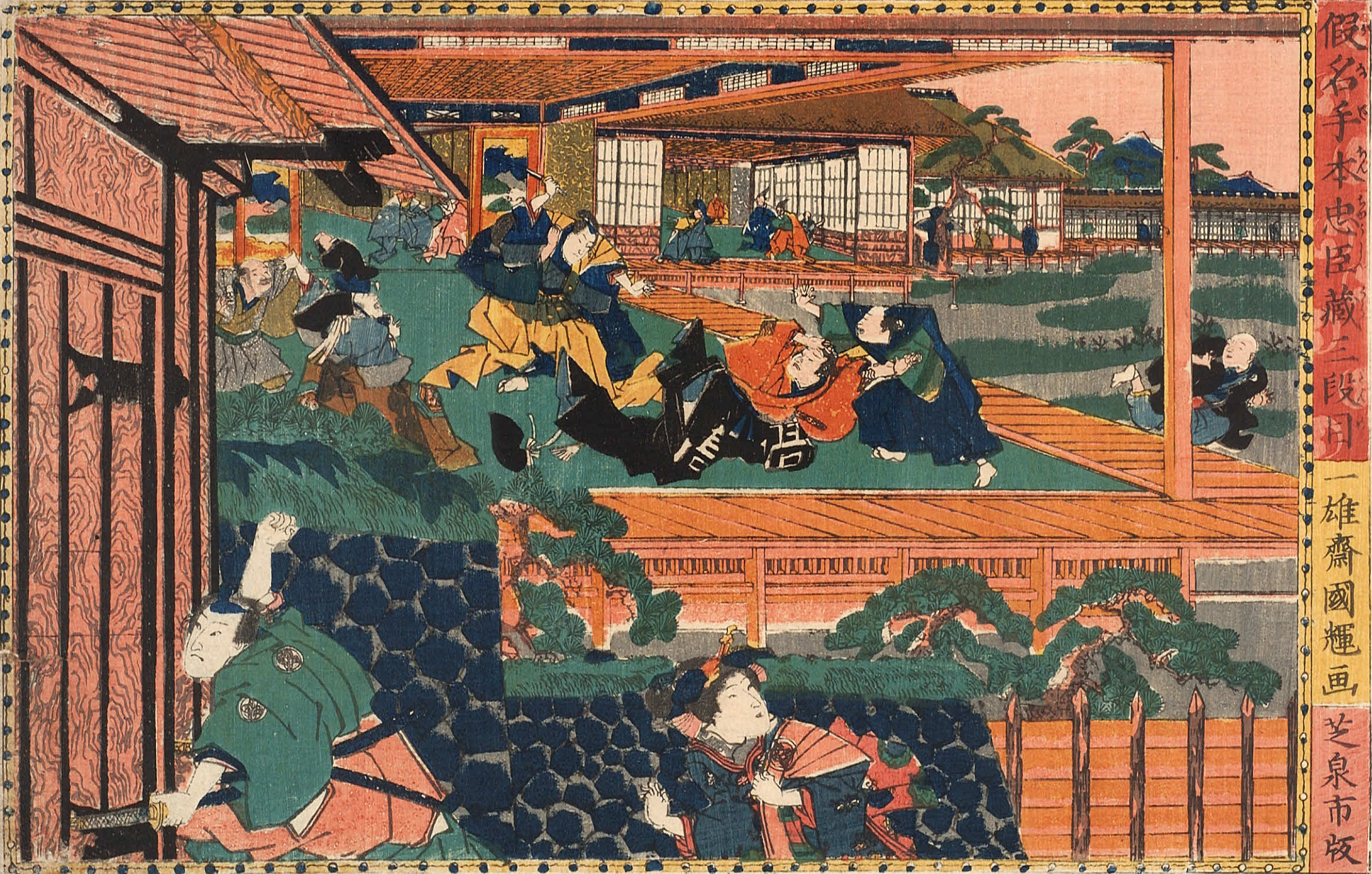
Ukiyo-e print depicting the assault of Asano Naganori on Kira Yoshinaka in the Matsu no Ōrōka in 1701

Various fires over the centuries damaged or destroyed parts of the castle, Edo and the majority of its buildings being made of timber.

On April 21, 1701, in the Great Pine Corridor (Matsu no Ōrōka) of Edo Castle, Asano Takumi-no-kami drew his short sword and attempted to kill Kira Kōzuke-no-suke. This triggered the events involving the forty-seven rōnin.

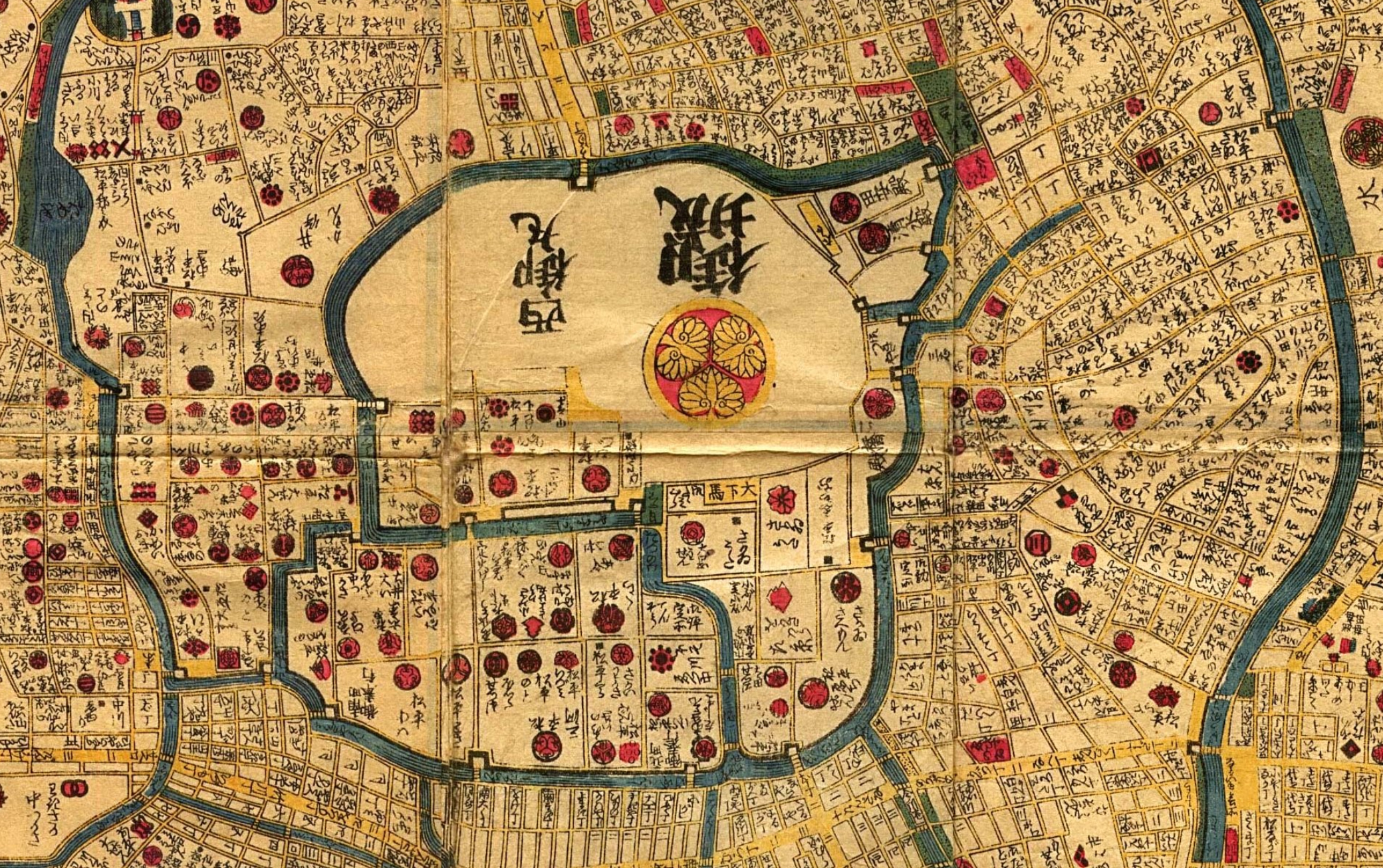
In this 1847 map, the castle area is censored.

After the capitulation of the shogunate in 1867, the inhabitants and shōgun had to vacate the premises. The castle compound was renamed Tokyo Castle (東京城, Tōkei-jō) in October, 1868, and then renamed Imperial Castle (皇城, Kōjō) in 1869. In the year Meiji 2 (1868), on the 23rd day of the 10th month of the Japanese calendar the emperor moved to Tokyo and Edo castle became an imperial palace.

A fire consumed the old Edo Castle on the night of May 5, 1873. The area around the old keep, which burned in the 1657 Meireki fire, became the site of the new Imperial Palace Castle (宮城, Kyūjō), built in 1888. Some Tokugawa-period buildings which were still standing were destroyed to make space for new structures for the imperial government. The imperial palace building itself, however, was constructed in Nishinomaru Ward, not in the same location as the shōgun's palace in Honmaru Ward.

The site suffered substantial damage during World War II and in the destruction of Tokyo in 1945.

Today the site is part of the Tokyo Imperial Palace. The government declared the area an historic site and has undertaken steps to restore and preserve the remaining structures of Edo Castle.

== Appearance of Edo Castle ==
The plan of Edo Castle was not only large but elaborate. The grounds were divided into various wards, or citadels. The Honmaru was in the center, with the Ninomaru (second compound), Sannomaru (third compound) extending to the east; the Nishinomaru (west compound) flanked by Nishinomaru-shita (outer section) and Fukiage (firebreak compound); and the Kitanomaru (north compound). The different wards were divided by moats and large stone walls, on which various keeps, defense houses and towers were built. To the east, beyond the Sannomaru was an outer moat, enclosing the Otomachi and Daimyō-Kōji districts. Ishigaki stone walls were constructed around the Honmaru and the eastern side of the Nishinomaru. Each ward could be reached via wooden bridges, which were buffered by gates on either side. The circumference is subject to debate, with estimates ranging from 6 to 10 miles.

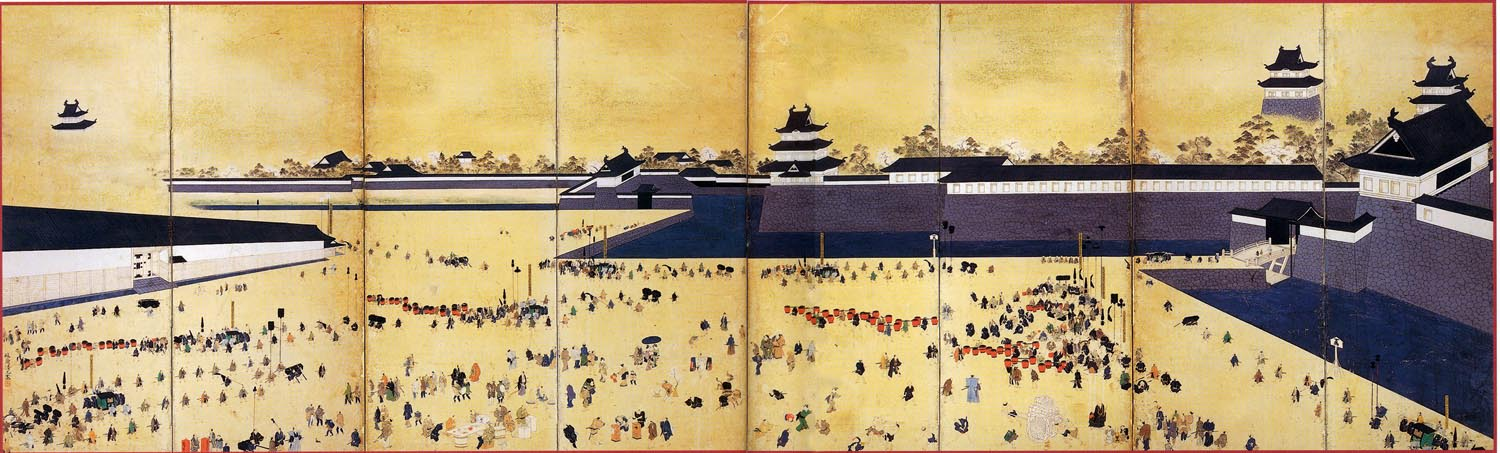
Folding screen depicting scenes of daimyōs attending at Edo Castle in 1847. Hasuike-Tatsumi-Sanjū-yagura is at the center, Kikyō-mon (the inner Sakurada-mon) on the right side. Signs alongside the moat are written with the words "geba" (dismount). The attending daimyōs were required to reduce their number of attendants before entering the inner castle compound. Signs with the family names of each entourage identify them (counting from the right side the first panel) from the Okayama Domain, Fukuoka Domain (fourth panel), Kurume Domain (fifth panel), Tottori Domain (sixth panel), Satsuma and Izumi Domains (seventh panel) and the Sendai Domain (eighth panel).

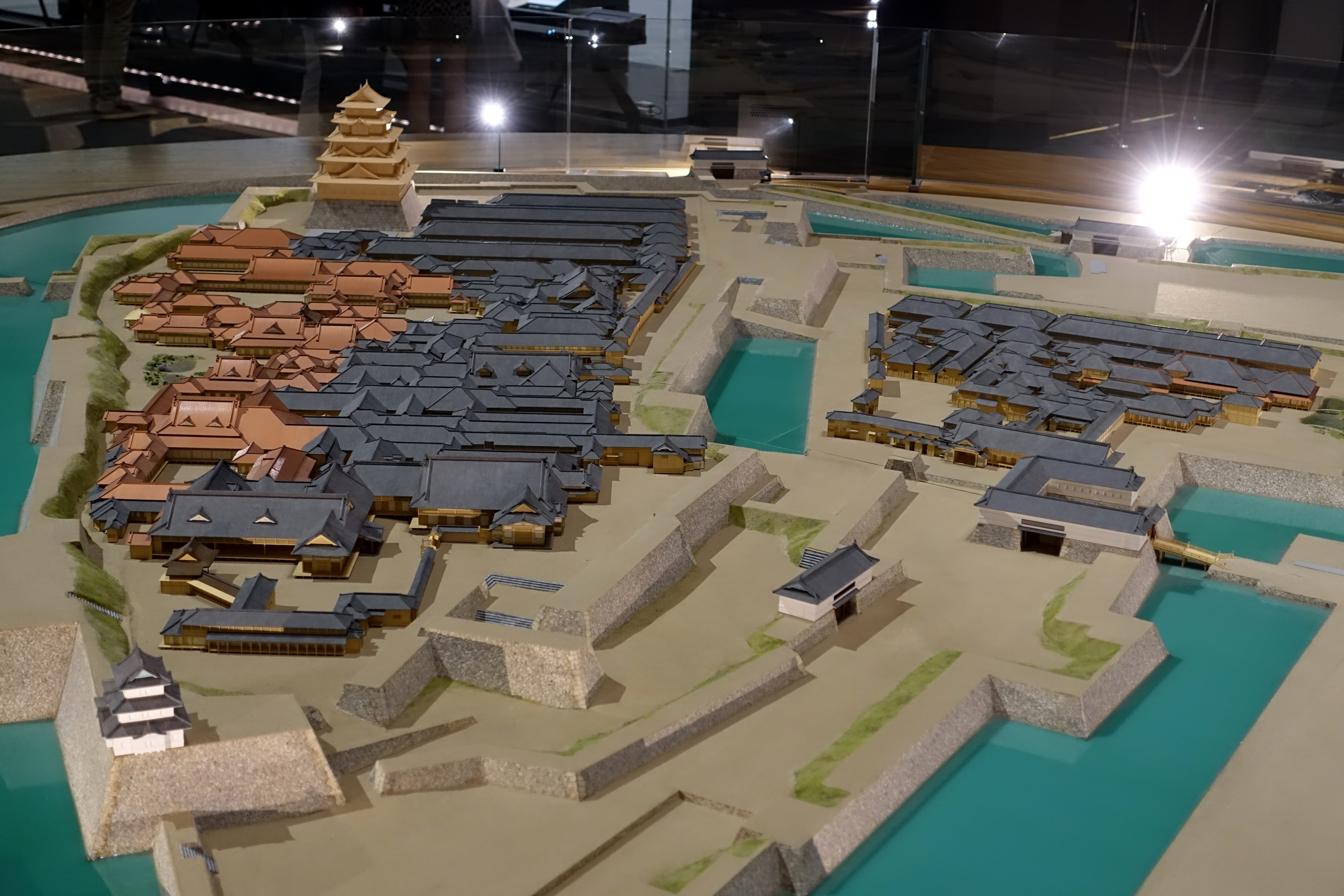
The appearance of the Honmaru and Ninomaru during the Edo period

With the enforcement of the sankin-kōtai system in the 17th century, it became expedient for the daimyōs to set up residence in Edo close to the shōgun. Surrounding the inner compounds of the castle were the residences of daimyōs, most of which were concentrated at the Outer Sakurada Gate to the south-east and in the Ōtemachi and Daimyō-Kōji districts east of the castle inside the outer moat. Some residences were also within the inner moats in the outer Nishinomaru.

The mansions were large and elaborate, with no expenses spared to construct palaces with Japanese gardens and multiple gates. Each block had four to six of the mansions, which were surrounded by ditches for drainage. Daimyōs with lesser wealth were allowed to set up their houses, called banchō, to the north and west of the castle.

To the east and south of the castle were sections that were set aside for merchants, since this area was considered unsuitable for residences. The entertainment district Yoshiwara was also there.

=== Gates ===
Edo Castle was protected by multiple large and small wooden gates (mon), constructed in-between the gaps of the stone wall. There were 36 major gates. Not many are left on the outer moats, because they were a traffic hazard. Since the central quarter is now Tokyo Imperial Palace, some gates on the inner moats are well maintained and used as security check points.

In old days, "Ote-mon" was the main gate and the most heavily armed. There were 3 more gates you would go through after "Ote-mon" to reach the Shogun's residence. Today, "Nishinomaru-mon" is the main entrance to the Palace. However, the twin bridge "Nijubashi" in front of it is more famous than the gate itself, thus the Palace Entrance is often publicly referred to as "Nijubashi".

An eye-witness account is given by the French director François Caron from the Dutch colony at Dejima. He described the gates and courts being laid out in such a manner as to confuse an outsider. Caron noted the gates were not placed in a straight line, but were staggered, forcing a person to make a 90 degree turn to pass on to the next gate. This style of construction for the main gates is called masugata (meaning "square"). As noted by Caron, the gate consisted of a square-shaped courtyard or enclosure and a two-story gatehouse which is entered via three roofed kōrai-mon. The watari-yagura-mon was constructed at adjacent angles to each side within the gate. All major gates had large timbers that framed the main entry point and were constructed to impress and proclaim the might of the shogunate.

=== Garrison ===
Accounts of how many armed men served at Edo Castle vary. The Spanish Governor-General of the Philippines Rodrigo de Vivero y Velasco gave an eye-witness account in 1608–1609, describing the huge stones that made up the walls and a large number of people at the castle. He claimed to have seen 20,000 servants between the first gate and the shōgun's palace. He passed through two ranks of 1,000 soldiers armed with muskets, and by the second gate he was escorted by 400 armed men. He passed stables that apparently had room for 200 horses and an armory that stored enough weapons for 100,000 men.

== Honmaru ==
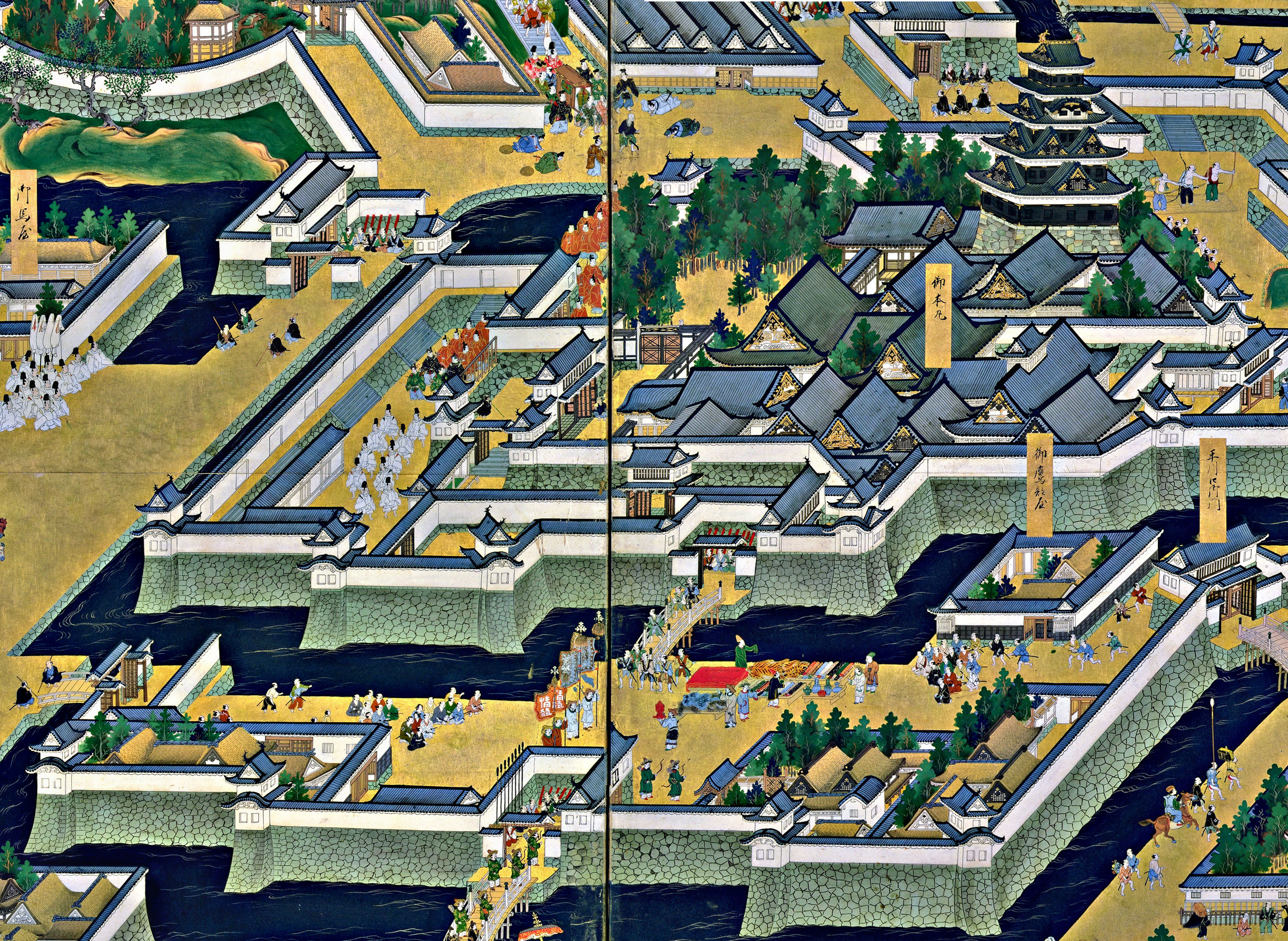
The main tower (upper right) with the surrounding Honmaru palace, Bairinzaka, Hirakawaguchi gate and Ninomaru (lower part)

The Honmaru (本丸; also spelled Hommaru) was the central, innermost part of the castle containing the keep and residence of the shōgun. The stately and luxurious main buildings of the Honmaru, consisting of the outer, central, and inner halls, were said to have covered an area of 33,000 square meters (360,000 sq ft) during the Kan-ei era (1624–1644). Surrounding the Honmaru were curtain walls, with 11 keeps, 15 defense houses and more than 20 gates.

Honmaru was destroyed several times by fire and reconstructed after each fire. The keep and main palace were destroyed in 1657 and 1863, respectively, and not reconstructed. Some remains, such as the Fujimi-yagura keep and Fujimi-tamon defense house, still exist.

The Honmaru was surrounded by moats on all sides. To the north separating Honmaru from the Kitanomaru were the Inui-bori and Hirakawa-bori, to the east separating the Ninomaru was the Hakuchō-bori, and to the west and south separating the Nishinomaru were the Hasuike-bori and Hamaguri-bori. Most of these still exist, although the Hakuchō-bori has partly been filled in since the Meiji era.

=== Kitahanebashi-mon ===
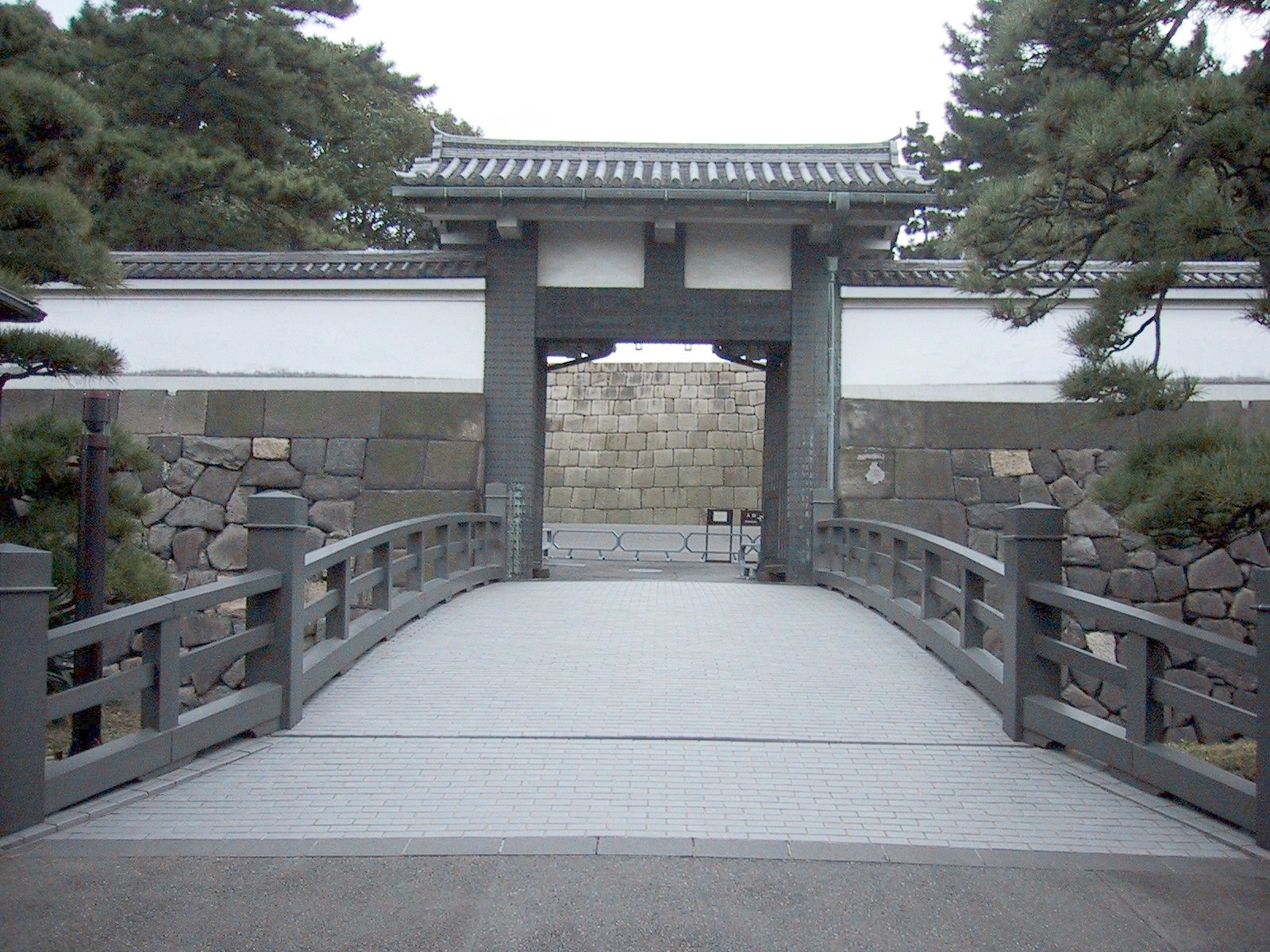
Kitahanebashi-mon

Kitahanebashi-mon (北桔橋門; "Northern Drawbridge Gate") is the northern gate to the Honmaru ward, facing Kitanomaru ward across Daikan-cho street. It is also constructed as a masu-gate just like Ōte-mon and Hirakawa-mon, and has a watari-yagura-mon in a left angle. The bridge in front of the gate, which was once a drawbridge during the Edo period, is now fixed to the ground. The metal clasps used to draw the bridge are still attached to the roof of the gate.

=== Keep ===
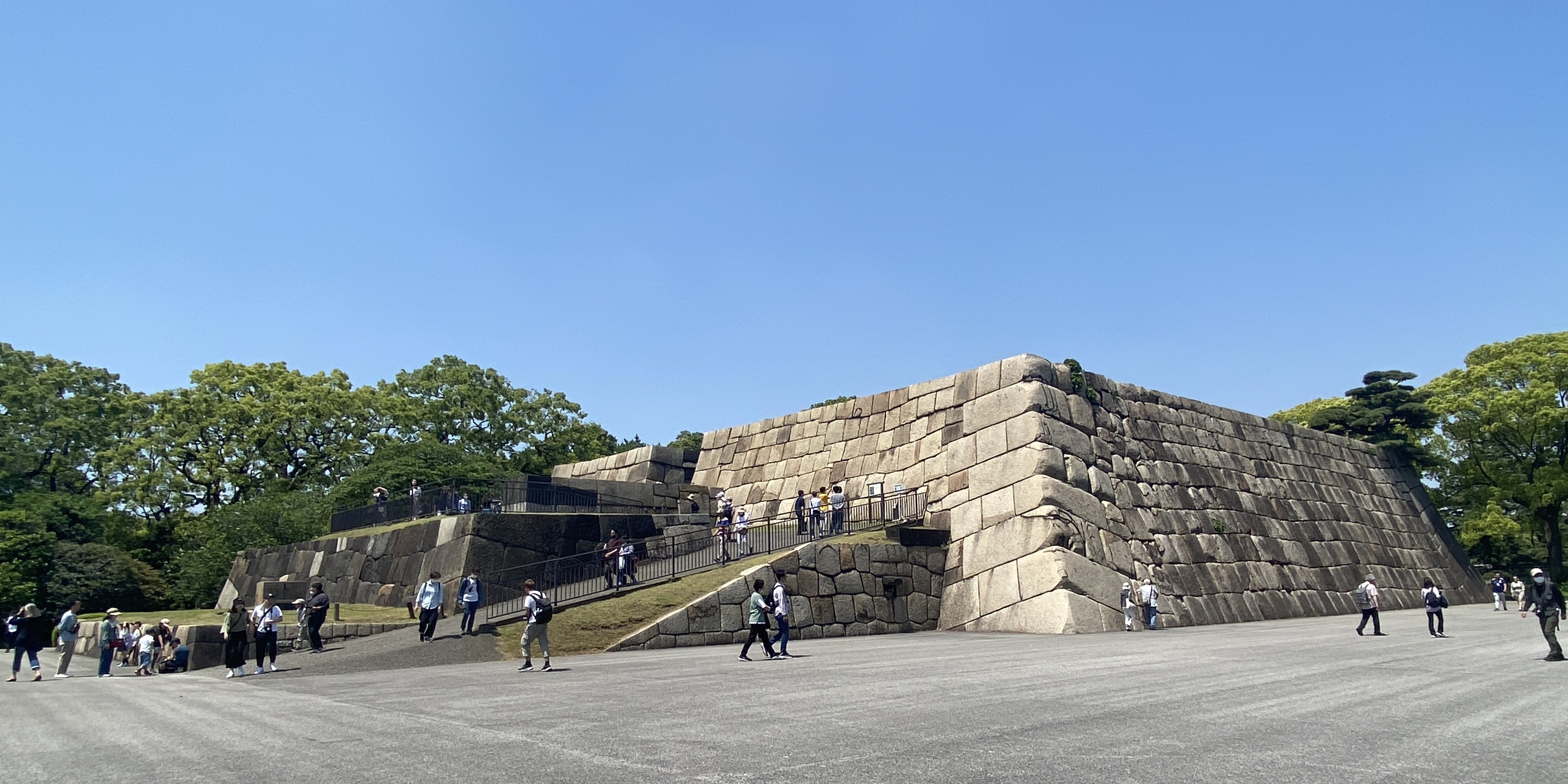
Stone foundation of the main tower (tenshu) in 2023

The main keep or tower, known as the tenshu-dai (天守台), was in the northern corner of the Honmaru ward. Kitahanebashi-mon is right next to it and was one of the main gateways to this innermost part. The measurements are 41 meters (135 ft) in width from east to west, 45 meters (148 ft) in length from north to south, and 11 meters (36 ft) in height. The castle once had a five-story keep which was 51 meters (167 ft) in height and was thus the highest castle tower in the whole of Japan, symbolizing the power of the shōgun. The first iteration of the keep and its multiple roofs were constructed in 1607 and ornamented with gold. It was rebuilt in 1623 and again in 1638. The third version of the keep was destroyed in the 1657 Fire of Meireki and not reconstructed. The foundations of the keep that survive today were built in preparation for reconstructing the keep, but were never used.

Despite this, jidaigeki movies (such as Abarenbō Shōgun) set in Edo usually depict Edo Castle as having a keep, and substitute Himeji Castle for that purpose.

A non-profit "Rebuilding Edo-jo Association" (NPO江戸城再建) was founded in 2004 with the aim of a historically correct reconstruction of at least the main keep. In March 2013 Naotaka Kotake, head of the group, said that "The capital city needs a symbolic building", and that the group planned to collect donations and signatures on a petition in the hope of having the tower rebuilt. A reconstruction blueprint had been made based on old documents. The Imperial Household Agency had not indicated whether it would support the project.

=== Honmaru Palace ===
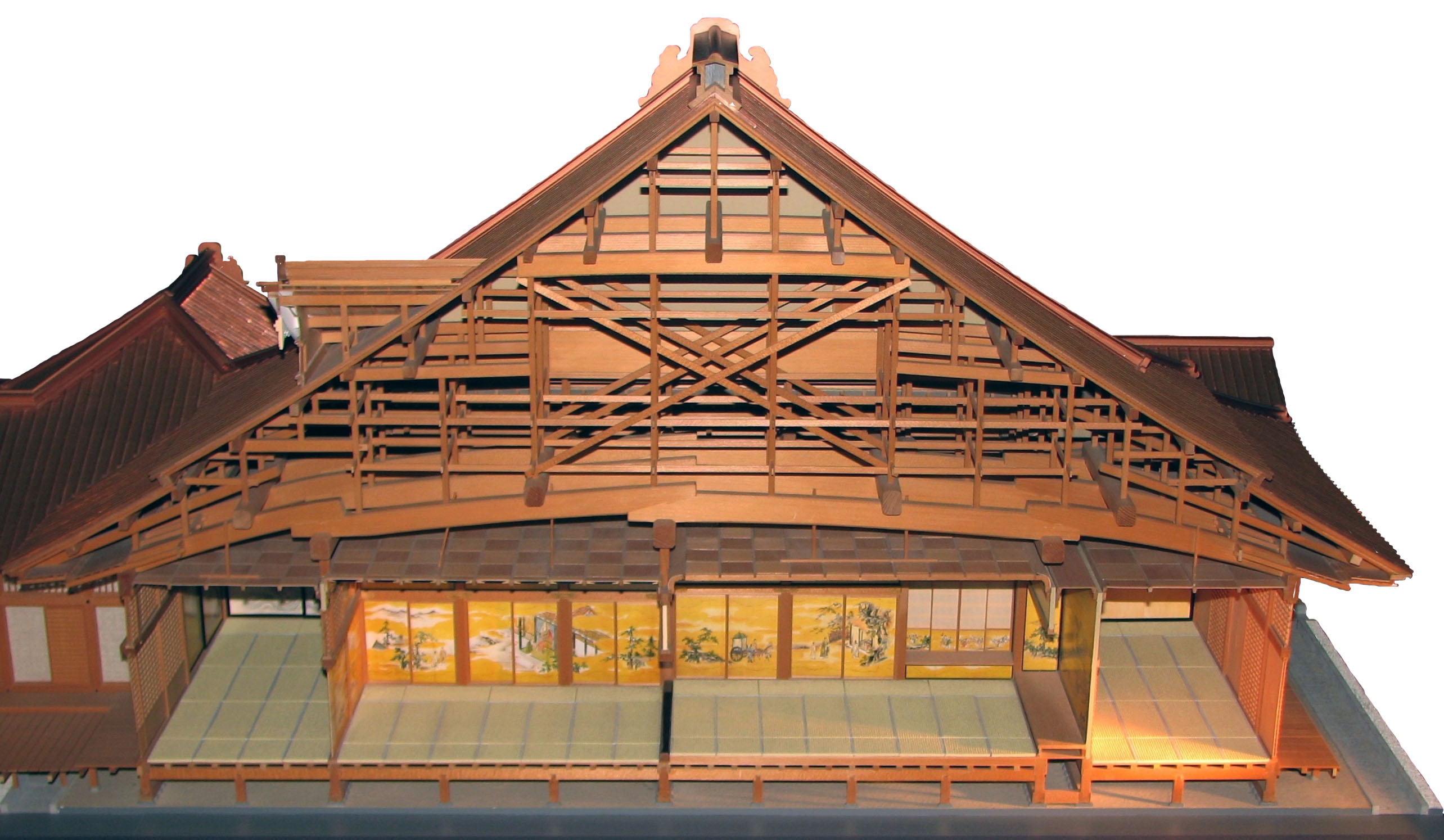
Model of shiro shoin ("white study room"), used for meetings with imperial messengers

The residential Honmaru Palace (本丸御殿, honmaru-goten) and the gardens of the shōgun and his court were constructed around the castle keep in the Honmaru area. It consisted of a series of low-level buildings, connected by corridors and congregating around various gardens, courtyards or lying detached, similar to the structures that can be seen in Nijō Castle in Kyoto today. These structures were used for either residential or governmental purposes such as audiences.

The Honmaru Palace was one story high, and consisted of three sections:

1. The Ō-omote (表, Great Outer Palace) contained reception rooms for public audience and apartments for guards and officials;
2. The Naka-oku (中奥, middle interior) was where the shōgun received his relatives, higher lords and met his counselors for the affairs of state; and
3. Ōoku (大奥, great interior) contained the private apartments of the shōgun and his ladies-in-waiting. The great interior was strictly off-limits and communication went through young messenger boys. The great interior was apparently 1,000 tatami mats in size and could be divided into sections by the use of sliding shōji doors, which were painted in elegant schemes.

Various fires destroyed the Honmaru Palace over time and was rebuilt after each fire. In the span from 1844 to 1863, Honmaru experienced three fires. After each fire, the shōgun moved to the Nishinomaru residences for the time being until reconstruction was complete. However, in 1853 both the Honmaru and Nishinomaru burned down, forcing the shōgun to move into a daimyō residence. The last fire occurred in 1873, after which the palace was not rebuilt by the new imperial government. Behind the Honmaru Palace was the main keep. Besides being the location of the keep and palace, the Honmaru was also the site of the treasury. Three storehouses that bordered on a rampart adjoined the palace on the other side. The entrance was small, made with thick lumber and heavily guarded. Behind the wall was a deep drop to the moat below, making the area secure.

=== Fujimi-yagura ===
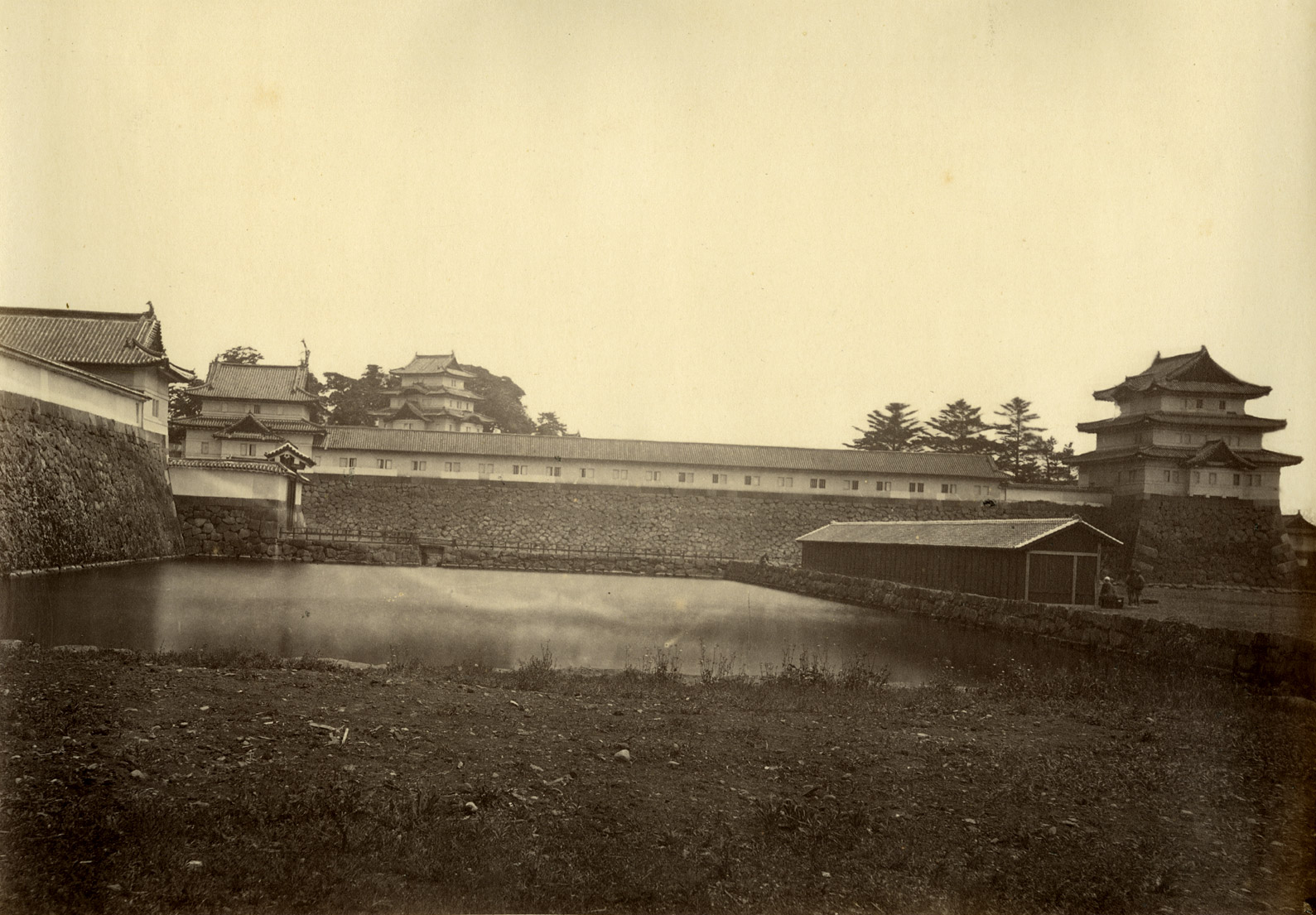
View onto Hamaguri-bori (front), Sakashita-mon (left), Hasuike-Tatsumi-Sanjū-yagura (right), Fujimi-yagura (center in the back) before 1870

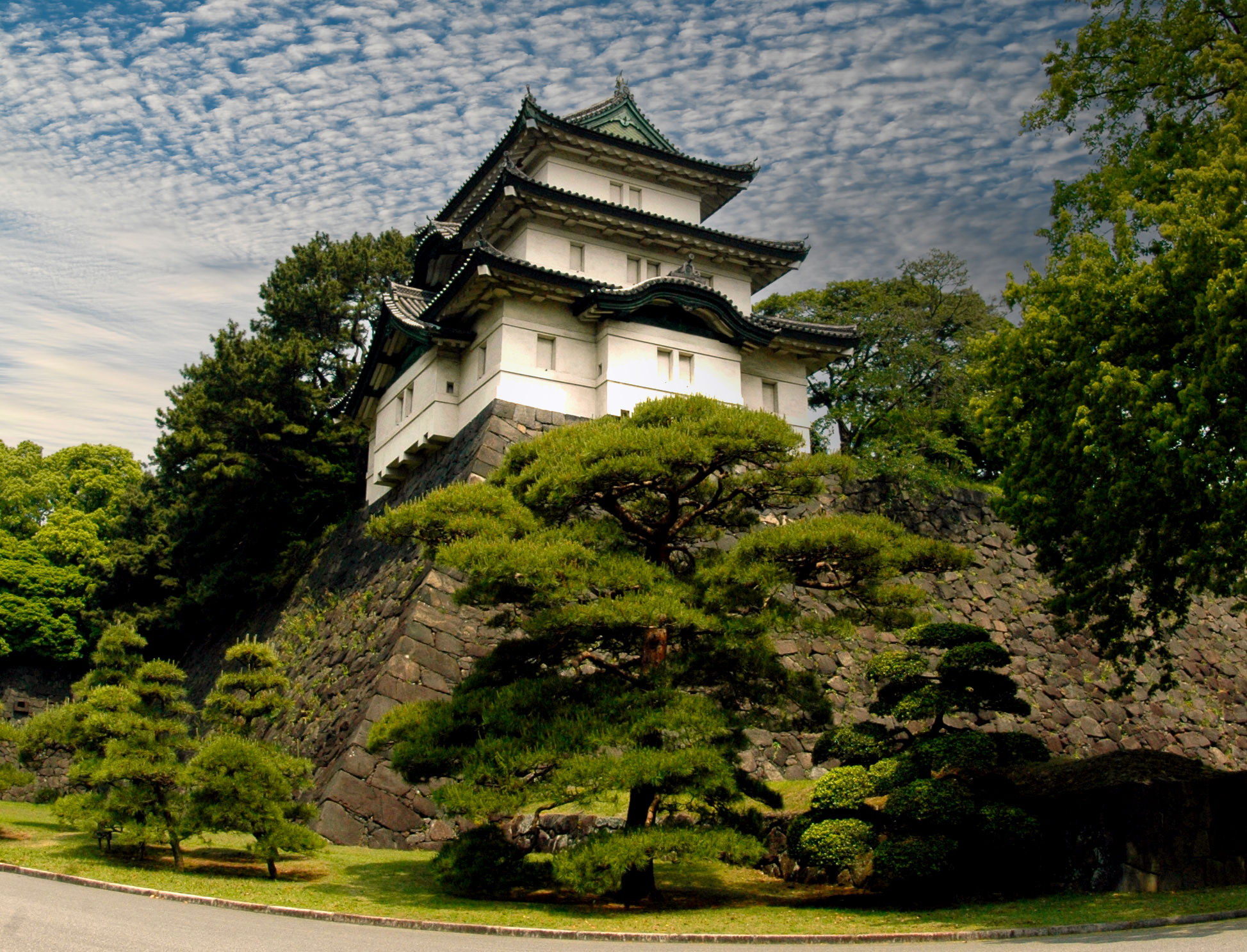
The Fujimi Yagura, built in 1659

The Fujimi-yagura (富士見櫓; "Mount Fuji-viewing keep") stands in the south-eastern corner of the Honmaru enceinte and is three storeys high. Fujimi-yagura is one of only three remaining keeps of the inner citadel of Edo Castle, from a total number of originally eleven. The other remaining keeps are Fushimi-yagura (next to the upper steel bridge of Nijūbashi) and Tatsumi-nijyu-yagura (at the corner of Kikyō-bori moat next to Kikyō-mon gate). It is also called the "all-front-sided" keep because all sides look the same from all directions. It is believed that once Mount Fuji could be seen from this keep, hence the name. Since the main keep of Edo Castle was destroyed in 1657 and not reconstructed, the Fujimi-yagura took on its role and was an important building after being constructed in 1659 during the Edo period. About 150–160 meters (490–520 ft) north of the Fujimi-yagura is the former site of the Matsu no Ōrōka corridor, scene of dramatic events in 1701 that led to the forty-seven rōnin incident.

=== Fujimi-tamon ===
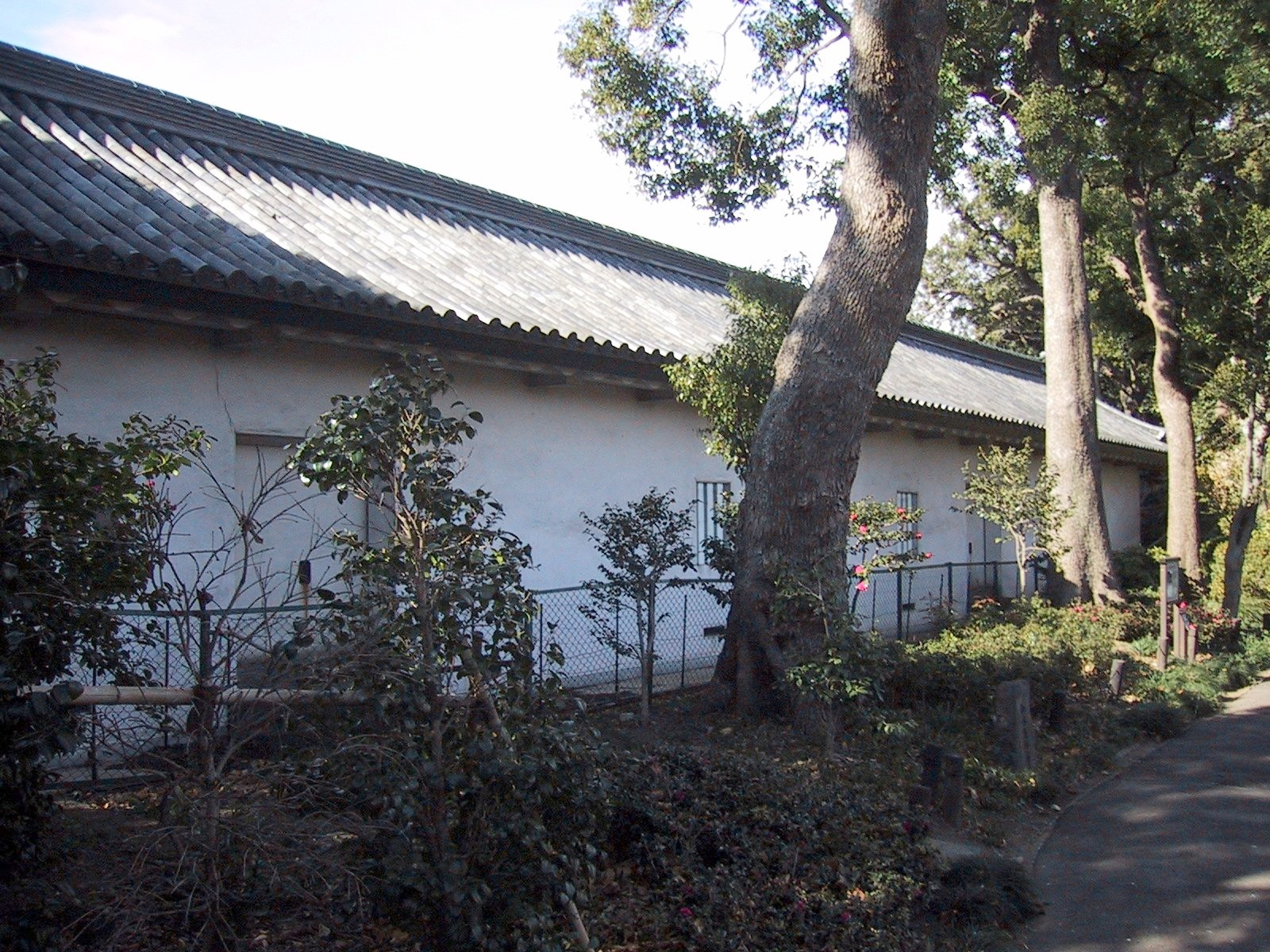
Fujimi-tamon

The Fujimi-tamon (富士見多聞) defense house is about 120–130 meters (390–430 ft) north from the Matsu no Ōrōka. This defense house sits on top of the large stone walls overlooking to the Hasuike-bori (Lotus-growing moat). Weapons and tools were stored here. During the Edo period, double and triple keeps (yagura) were constructed at strategic points on top of the stone wall surrounding the Honmaru. In between each keep, a defense house (called tamon) was erected for defensive purposes. There were once 15 of these houses in the Honmaru, of which only the Fujimi-tamon still exists.

=== Ishimuro ===
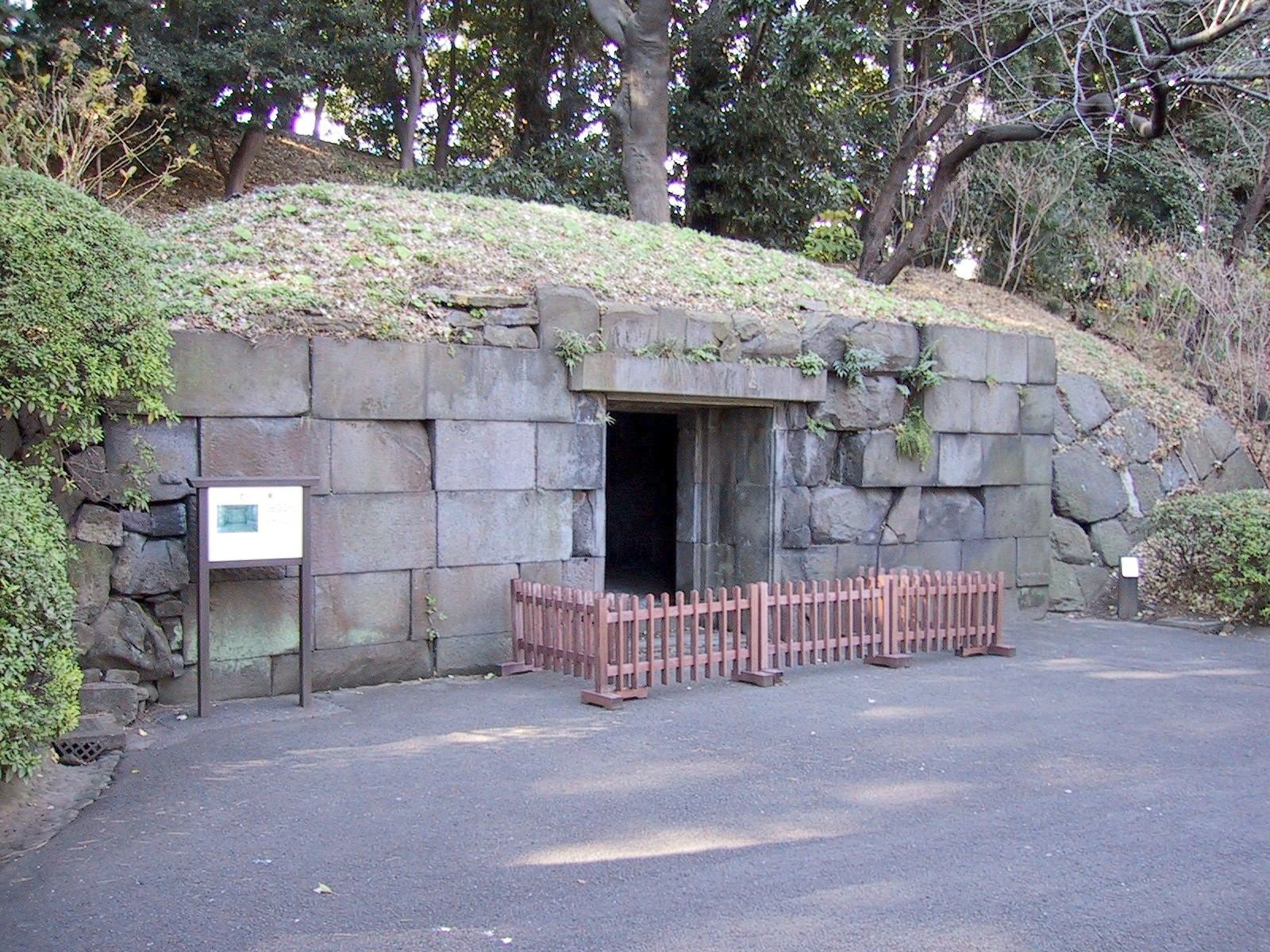
Ishimuro

North of the Fujimi-tamon is the ishimuro (石室; "stone cellar"), on a slope. It is about 20 square meters (220 sq ft). Its precise purpose is unknown, but since it is close to the former inner palace storage area, it is believed to have been used for storage of supplies and documents for the shogunate.

=== Shiomi-zaka ===
Shiomi-zaka (潮見坂) is a slope running alongside today's Imperial Music Department building towards Ninomaru enceinte. In old times apparently the sea could be seen from here, therefore its name.

== Ninomaru ==
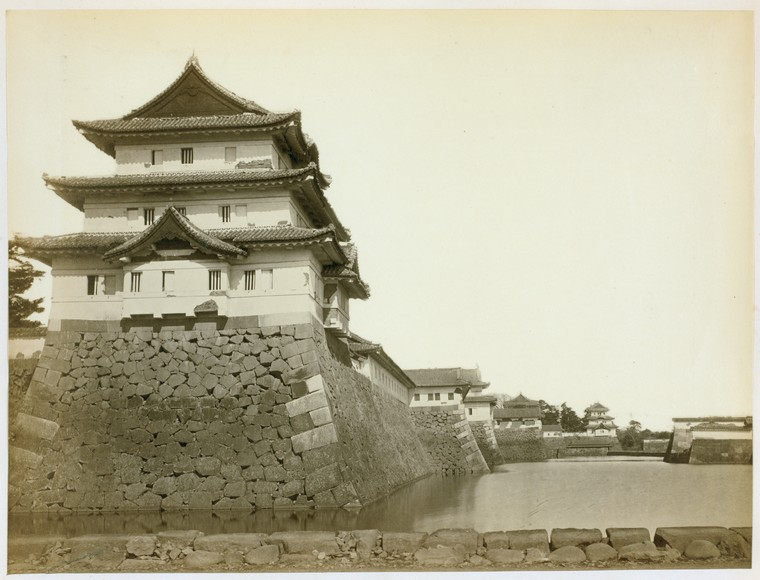
Hamaguri-bori (front), Hasuike-Tatsumi-Sanjū-yagura (left), Tatsumi-Sanjū-yagura(right) before 1870

At the foot of the Shiomi-zaka on the eastern side of the Honmaru lies the Ninomaru (二の丸; second enceinte) of Edo Castle. A palace for the heirs of the Tokugawa shōguns was constructed in 1639 in the west area (Western Perimeter) and in 1630 it is reported that a garden designed by Kobori Enshū, who was the founder of Japanese landscaping, was to its south-east. Several fires destroyed whatever stood here and it was not reconstructed. Aside from the Honmaru palace, the Ninomaru was surrounded by 7 keeps, 8 defense houses, approximately 10 gates and other guardhouses. The Tenjin-bori separates a part of the Ninomaru to the Sannomaru.

Several renovations were carried out over the years until the Meiji era. A completely new garden has been laid out since then around the old pond left from the Edo period. Only the Hyakunin-bansho and Dōshin-bansho are still standing.

=== Dōshin-bansho ===
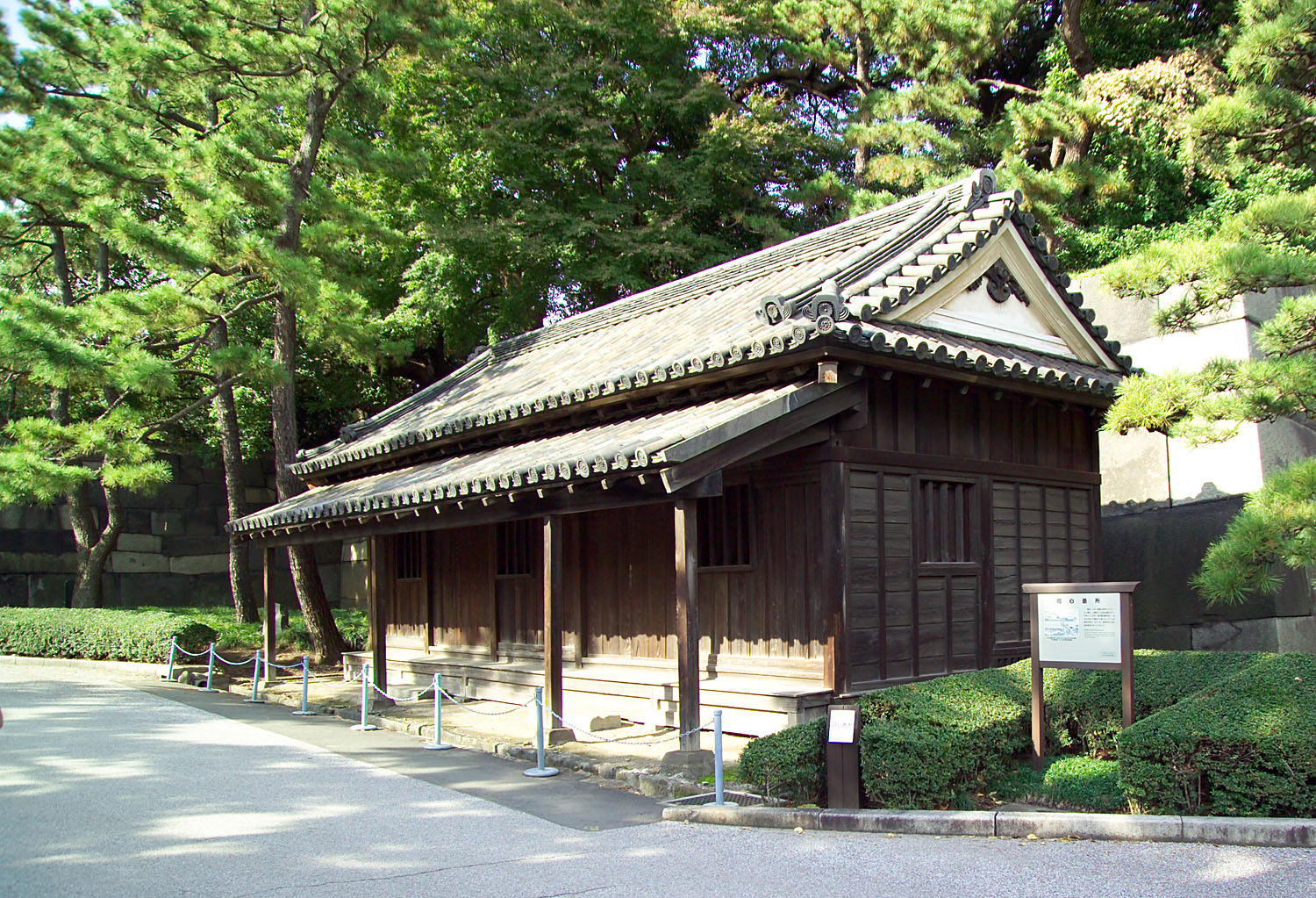
Dōshin-bansho

The dōshin-bansho (同心番所) is a guardhouse. A big guardhouse was within the Ōte-mon where today's security is. The passageway proceeding west from the guardhouse becomes narrower within the stone walls on both sides. The dōshin-bansho is on the right side past this passageway. This is where the samurai guardsmen were posted to watch over the castle grounds.

=== Hyakunin-bansho ===
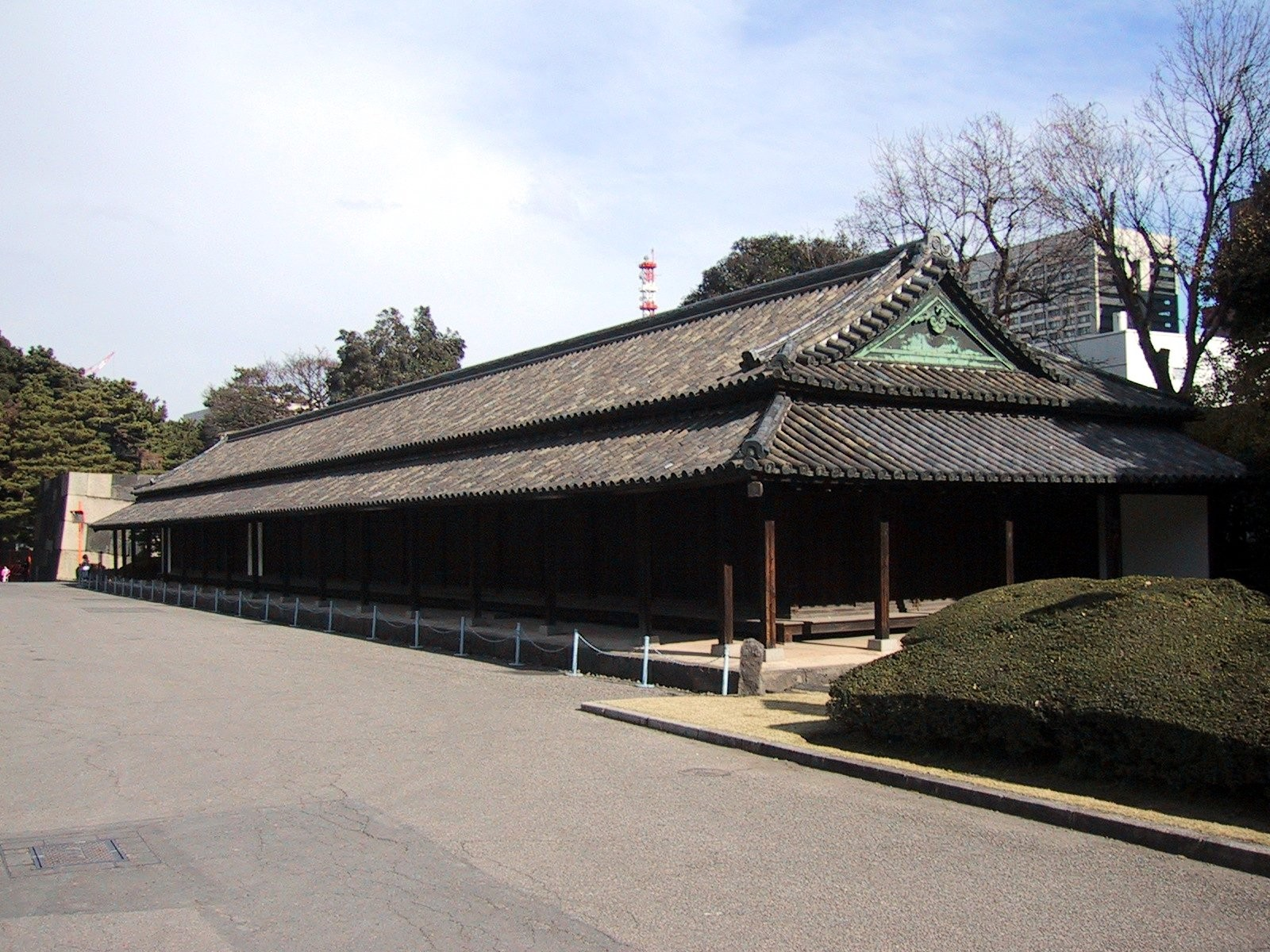
Hyakunin-bansho

There is a big stone wall in front of the Dōshin-bansho, which is the foundation of the Ōte-sanno-mon watari-yagura keep. The long building to the left on the southern side of this foundation is the hyakunin-bansho (百人番所). The Hyakunin-bansho is so called because it housed a hundred guardsmen closely associated with the Tokugawa clan.

=== Ō-bansho ===
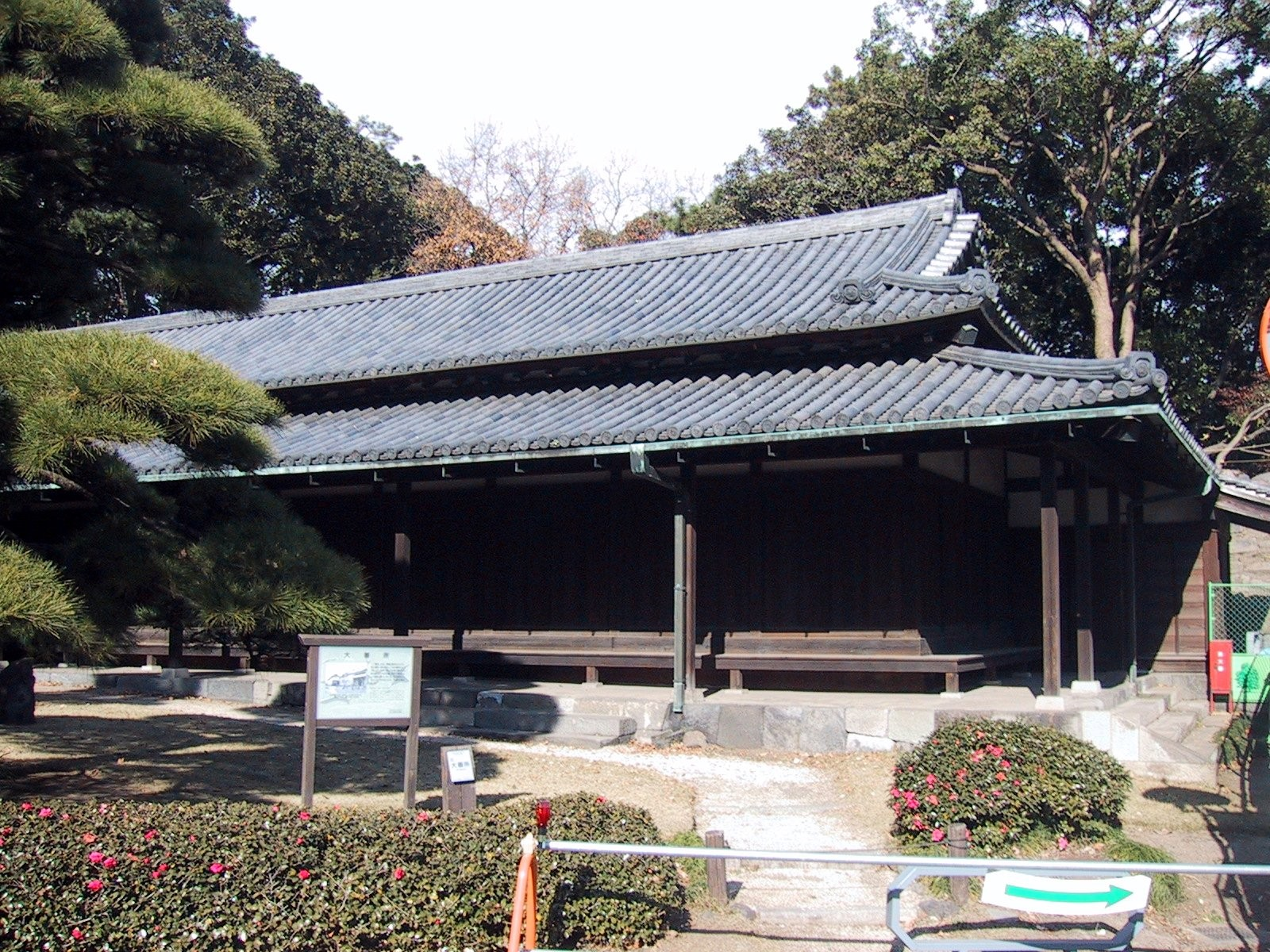
Ō-bansho

The large stone wall in front of the Hyakunin-bansho is all that is left of the Naka-no-mon watari-yagura (Inner Gate Keep). This building to the inner-right side of the gate is the Ō-bansho (大番所). As the Honmaru enceinte was said to begin right behind the Naka-no-mon gate, the Ō-bansho probably played a key role in the security of Edo Castle.

=== Suwa-no-Chaya ===
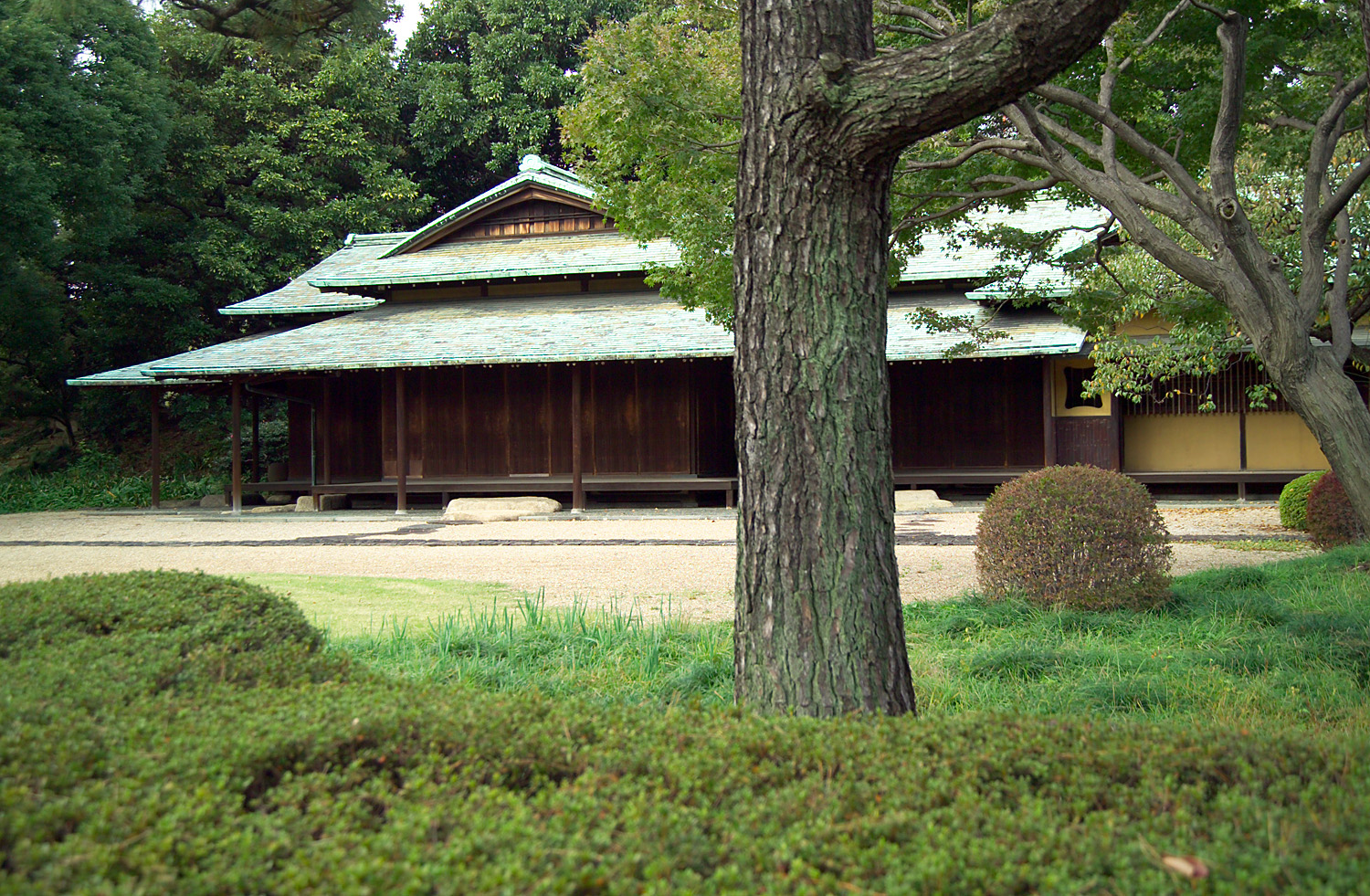
Suwa-no-Chaya

The Suwa-no-Chaya (諏訪の茶屋) is a teahouse that was once in the Fukiage garden during the Edo period. After various relocations in the Meiji era, today it is in the modern Ninomaru Garden.

== Sannomaru ==
The sannomaru (三の丸; third enceinte) is the easternmost enceinte next to the Ninomaru, separated by the Tenjin-bori. Ōte-bori is to the north, running then south is Kikyō-bori.

=== Bairin-zaka ===
A steep slope, Bairin-zaka (梅林坂), runs from eastern Honmaru toward Hirakawa-mon in front of the today's Archives and Mausolea Department building. It is said that Ōta Dōkan planted several hundred plum trees in 1478 in dedication to Sugawara no Michizane. Dōkan is said to have built the Sanno-Gongendō here, where two shrines were when the Tokugawa clan occupied the site. With the erection of the Honmaru of Edo Castle, the shrine dedicated to Sugawara no Michizane was moved to Kojimachi Hirakawa-chō and later became known as Hirakawa Shrine. Sanno Shrine was first moved to Momijiyama of Edo Castle and became its tutelary shrine but was moved again. Today it is known as Hie Shrine.

=== Hirakawa-mon ===
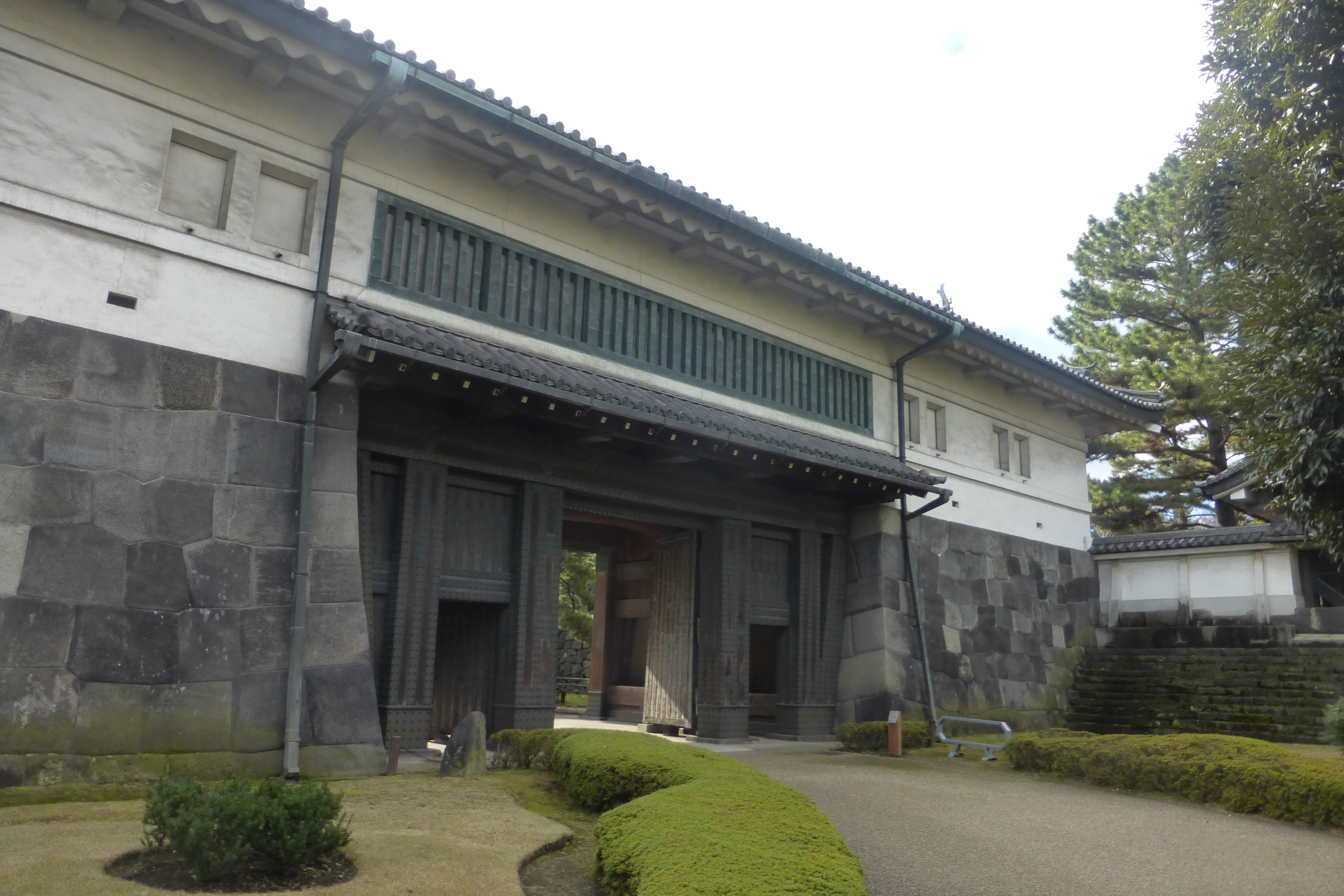
Hirakawa-mon

Hirakawa-mon (平川門) is said to have been the main gate to the Sannomaru of Edo Castle. It is also said to have been the side gate for maidservants and therefore called the Otsubone-mon. The shape of this gate is in the masugata, similar to the Ōte-mon. However a watari-yagura-mon is built to an adjacent left angle within the kōrai-mon, of which it has two. The other kōrai-mon is to the west of the watari-yagura-mon which was used as the "gates of the unclean" for the deceased and criminals from within the castle. Outside this gate is a wooden bridge with railings crowned with giboshi-ornamental tops.

=== Ōte-mon ===
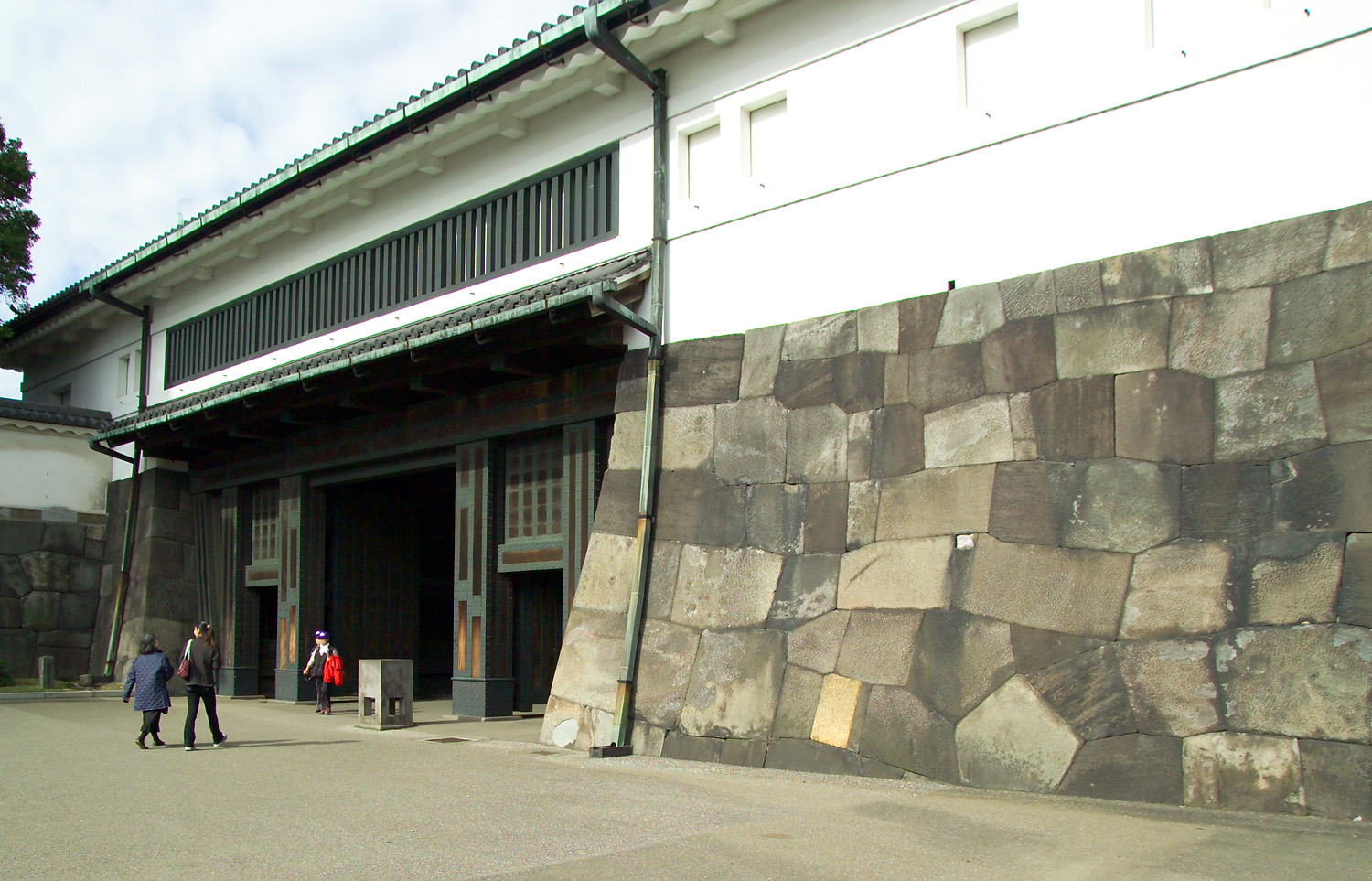
Ōte-mon

Ōte-mon (大手門; "Great Hand Gate") was the main gate of the castle. During the reign of the second Tokugawa shōgun Hidetada, the castle underwent repairs in the 1620s and the gate is said to have taken its present form at this time, with the help of Date Masamune, lord of Sendai Castle, and Soma Toshitane, lord of Nakamura Castle.

A fire in Edo destroyed the Ōte-mon in January 1657, but was reconstructed in November 1658. It was severely damaged twice, in 1703 and 1855, by strong earthquakes, and reconstructed to stand until the Meiji era. Several repairs were conducted after the Meiji era, but the damage caused by the September 1923 Great Kantō earthquake lead to the dismantling of the watari-yagura (渡り櫓) and rebuilding of the stone walls on each side of the gate in 1925.

The watari-yagura was burnt down completely during World War II on April 30, 1945. Restoration took place from October 1965 through March 1967, to repair the kōrai-mon and its walls, and the Ōte-mon was reconstructed.

=== Tatsumi-yagura ===
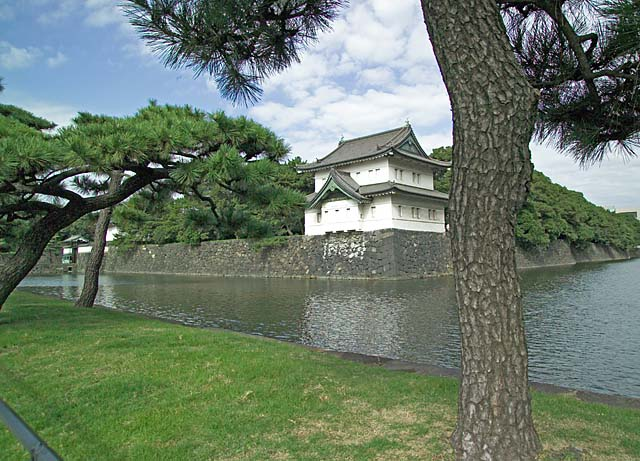
Tatsumi-yagura at Kikyō-bori

The tatsumi-yagura (巽櫓), also known as sakurada-yagura (桜田櫓), is a two-story high keep at the easternmost corner of the Sannomaru and the only keep still remaining in it.

=== Kikyō-mon ===
One of the few gates left of the Ninomaru is the kikyō-mon (桔梗門), which is also known as the Inner Sakurada-mon, as opposed to the (Outer) Sakurada-mon in the south. The architecture of the tower is a gate and in the kōrai style.

== Nishinomaru ==
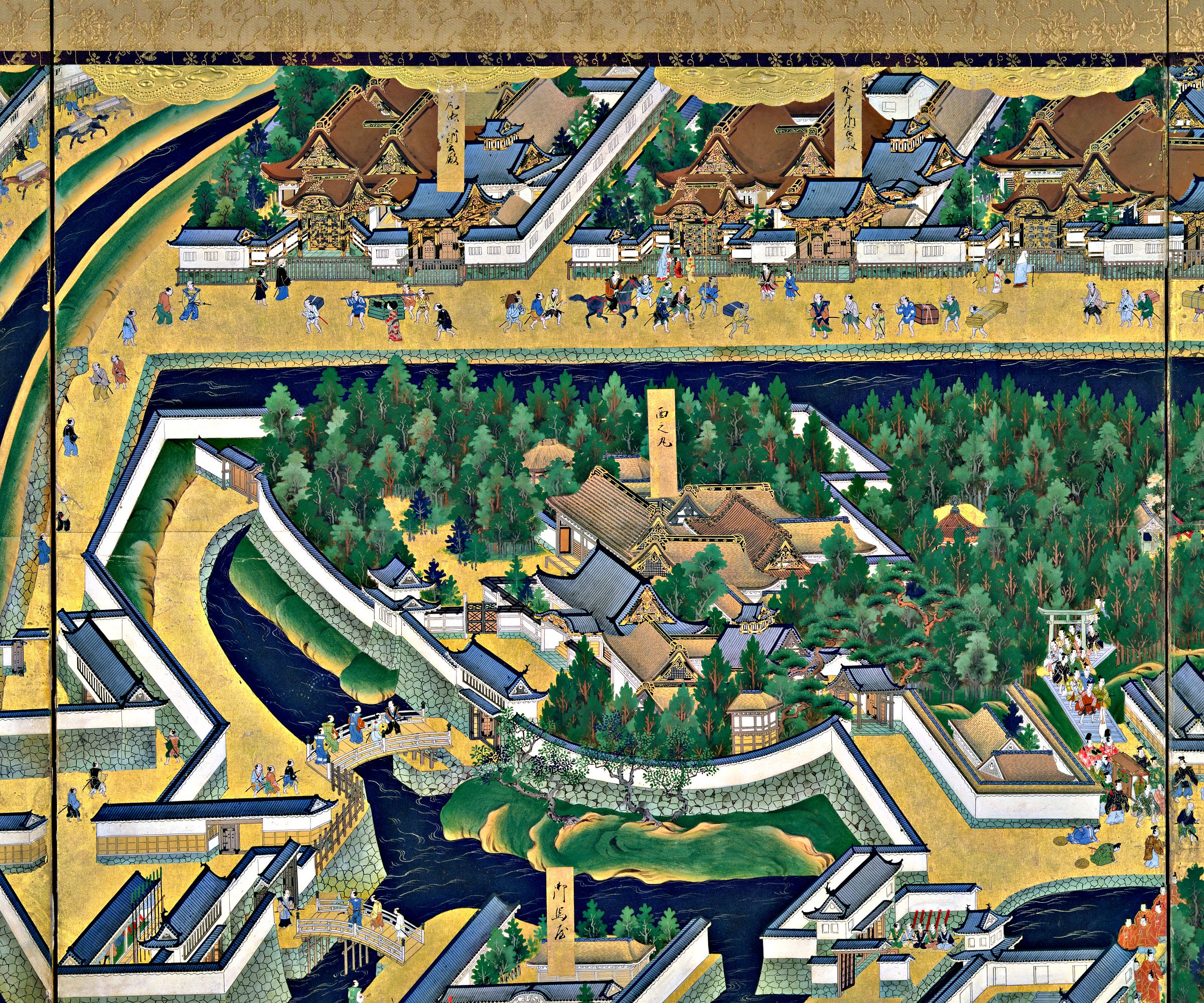
Nishinomaru and Fukiage, residences of the three Tokugawa families (17th century)

The nishinomaru (西の丸; western ward) was the location of the palaces and residences of the retired shōgun and the heir-apparent for a while. The outer part of the Nishinomaru to the east (today's Outer Gardens of the Imperial Palace) was the site of various residences of daimyōs. The Nishinomaru is bordered by moats to the west such as the Dōkan-bori, Sakurada-bori and Gaisen-bori to the south, Kikyō-bori and Hamaguri-bori to the north. After each fire in the Honmaru, the shōgun normally moved into the Nishinomaru, although it was also destroyed by fire in 1853. On May 5, 1873, the Nishinomaru residence burned down. On its site, the imperial palace was built in the Meiji era.

=== Sakurada-mon ===
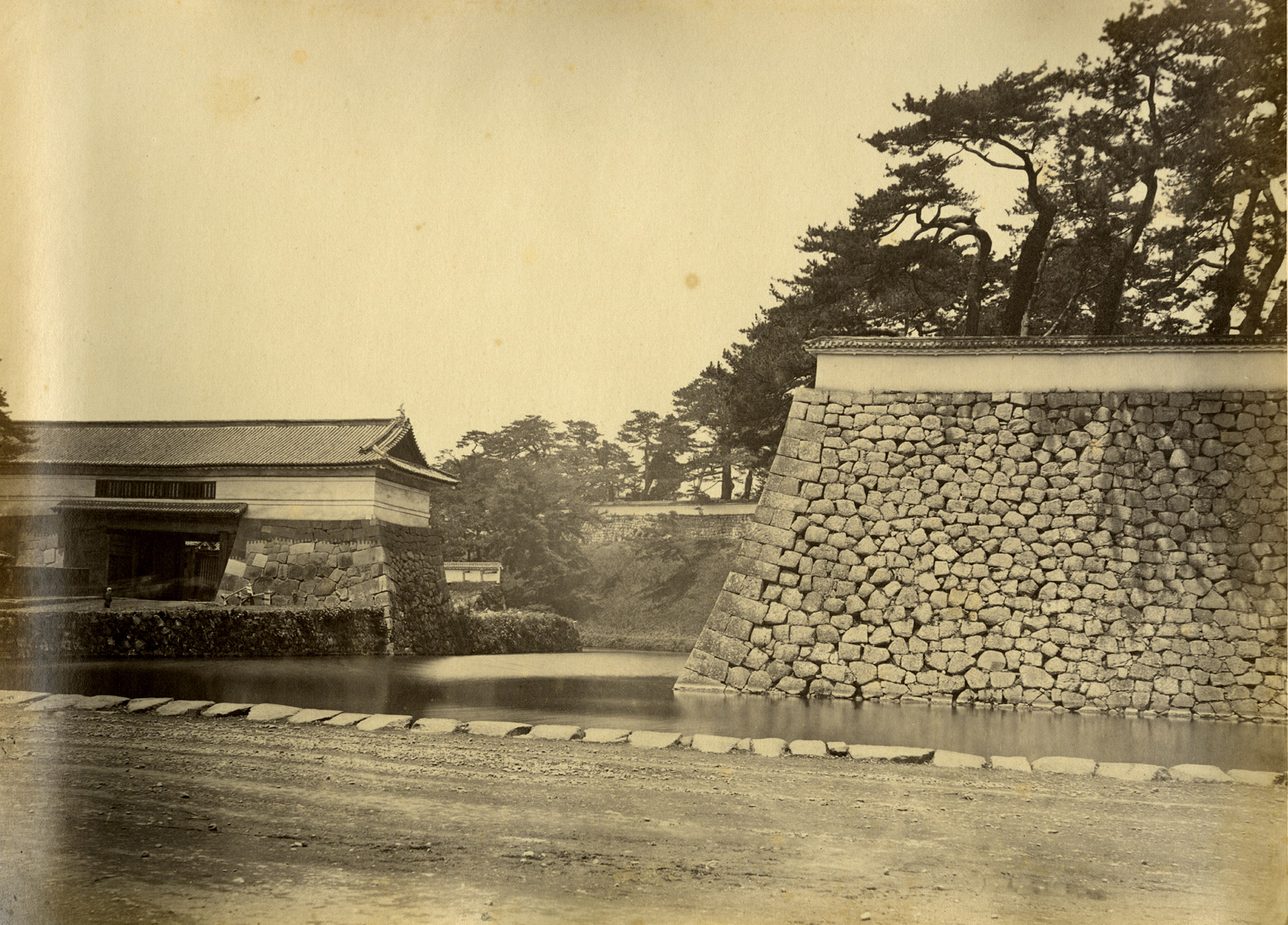
Sakurada-mon (left), the place where the Tairō Ii Naosuke was assassinated in 1860

Protecting the Nishinomaru from the south is the large Outer Sakurada-mon (桜田門). This gate is not to be confused with the Inner Sakurada-mon, also known as Kikyo-mon between Nishinomaru and Sannomaru.

=== Seimon Ishibashi and Seimon Tetsubashi ===
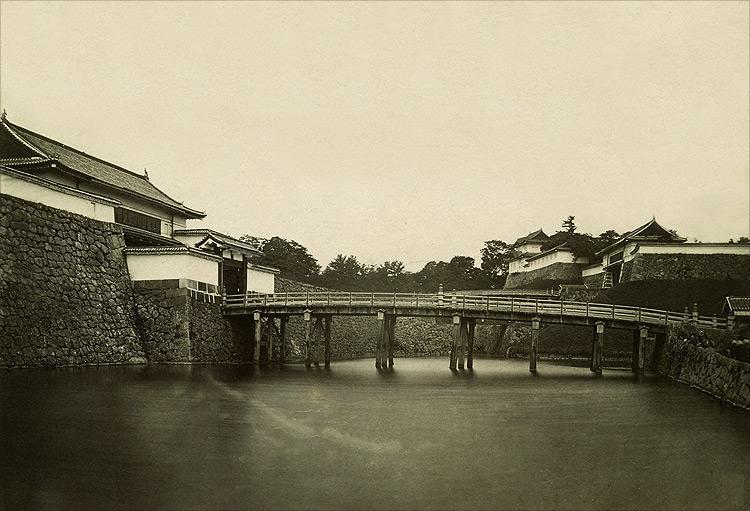
The old bridge before it was replaced with a European-style bridge during the Meiji-era, with the Fushimi-yagura in the back

Two bridges led over the moats. The bridges that were once wooden and arched, were replaced with modern stone and iron cast structures in the Meiji era. The bridges were once buffered by gates on both ends, of which only the Nishinomaru-mon has survived, which is the main gate to today's Imperial Palace.

The bridge in the foreground used to be called Nishinomaru Ōte-bashi (西の丸大手橋), while the one in the back was called Nishinomaru Shimojō-bashi (西の丸下乗橋).

After their replacement in the Meiji era, the bridge is now called Imperial Palace Main Gate Stone Bridge (皇居正門石橋, kōkyo seimon ishibashi)) and Imperial Palace Main Gate Iron Bridge (皇居正門鉄橋, kōkyo seimon tekkyō), respectively. The iron bridge is also known as Nijūbashi (二重橋; literally "double bridge"), because the original wooden bridge was built on top of an auxiliary bridge due to the deepness of the moat. The stone bridge is also called Meganebashi (眼鏡橋; literally "Spectacles Bridge") because of its shape. However, both bridges are often mistakenly collectively called Nijūbashi.

Today both bridges are closed to the public except on January 2 and the Emperor's Birthday.

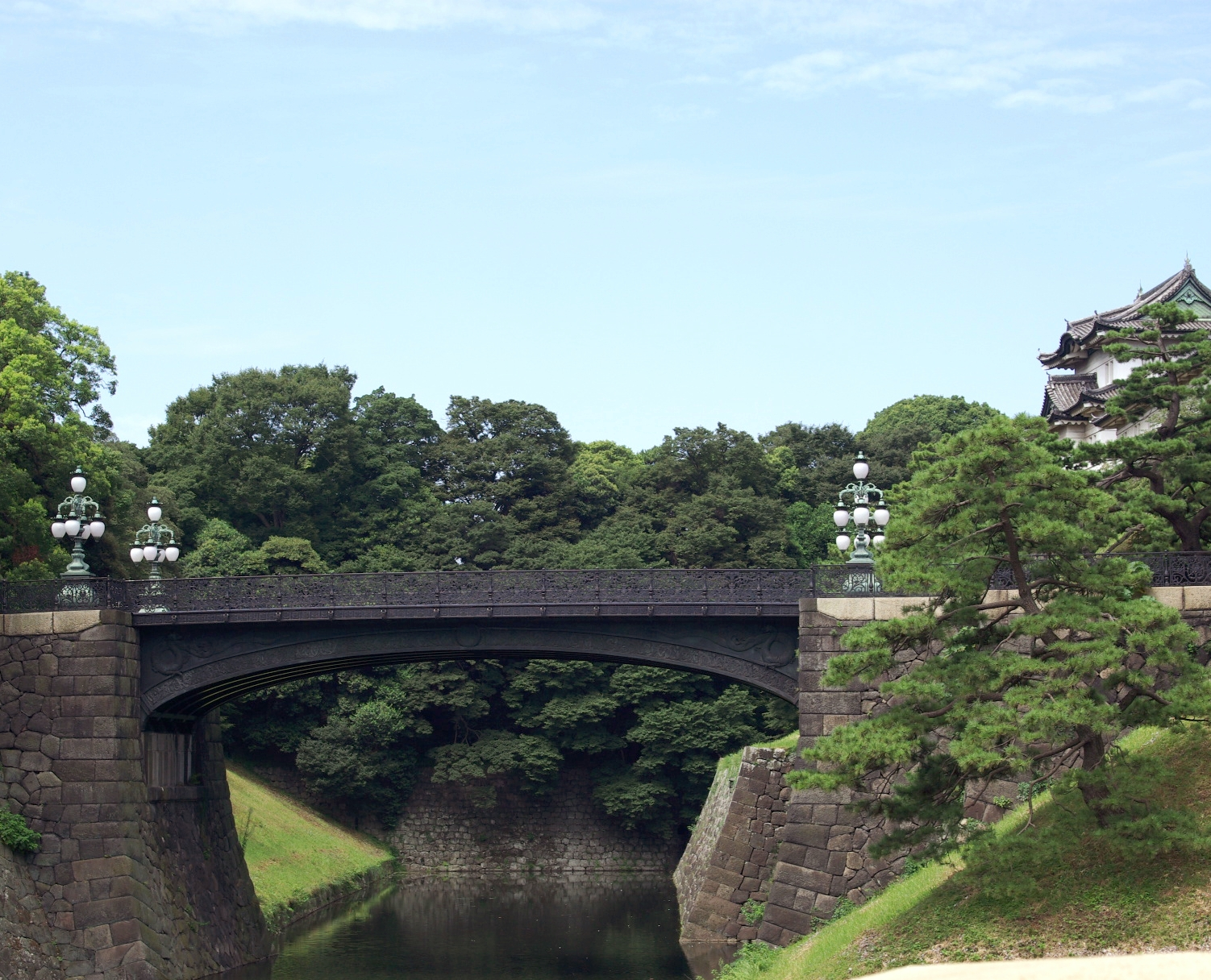
Seimon Tetsubashi (Nijūbashi)

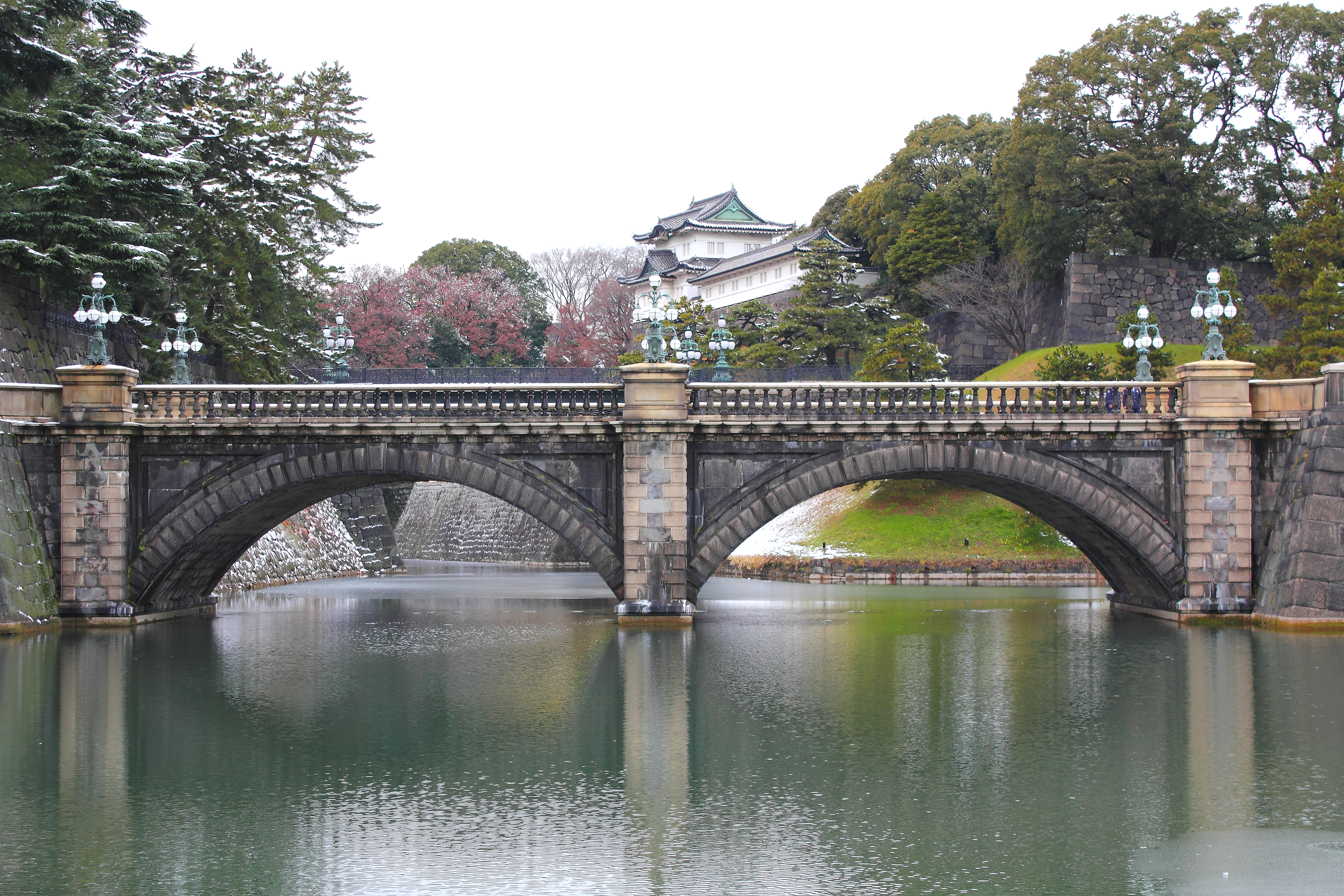
Seimon Ishibashi (Meganebashi)

=== Fushimi-yagura ===
Fushimi-yagura (伏見櫓) is a two-storey keep that still exists at the western corner leading towards the inner Nishinomaru, flanked by two galleries (tamon) on each side. It is the only keep that is left in the Nishinomaru. It comes originally from Fushimi Castle in Kyoto.

=== Sakashita-mon ===
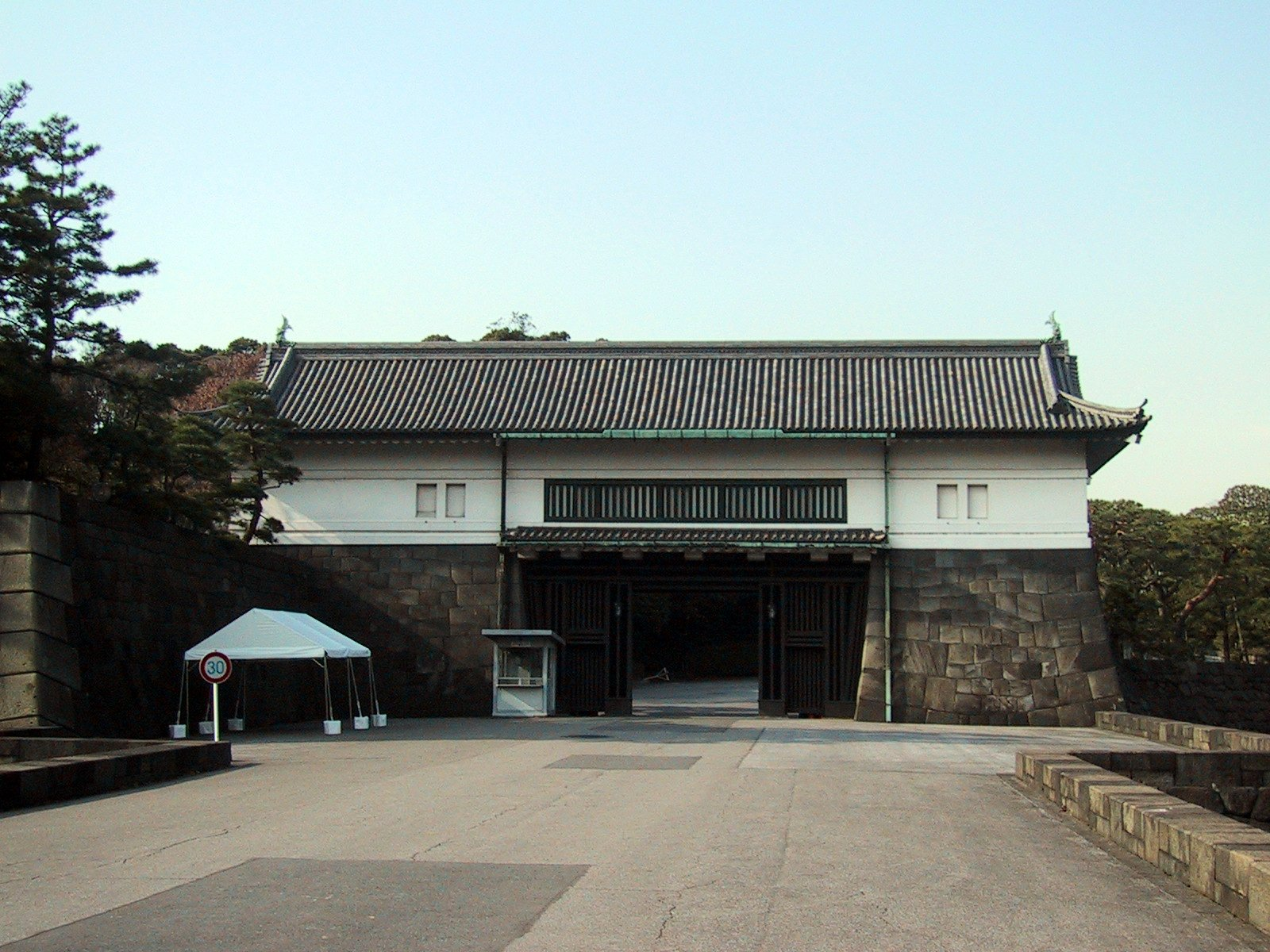
Sakashita-mon

Sakashita-mon (坂下門) originally faced the north, but was changed to face the east in the Meiji era. This tower gate overlooks Hamaguri-bori. The assassination of Andō Nobumasa, a member of the shōgun's Council of Elders, occurred outside this gate.

=== Momijiyama ===
Momijiyama (紅葉山; "Maple Mountain") is an area in northern Nishinomaru. The area had shrines dedicated to former shōguns in which ceremonies were conducted in memory of them and were held regularly.

Tokugawa Ieyasu built a library in 1602 within the Fujimi bower of the castle with a number of books he obtained from an old library in Kanazawa. In July 1693, a new library was constructed at Momijiyama (Momijiyama Bunko).

The so-called "Momijiyama Bunkobon" are the books from that library, which are preserved in the National Archives of Japan today. This group consists chiefly of books published during the Song dynasty, Korean books that were formerly in the possession of the Kanazawa Bunko library, books presented by the Hayashi family as gifts, and fair copies of books compiled by the Tokugawa government.

== Fukiage ==
The fukiage (吹上; "blown clean") is the western area that was made into a firebreak after the great Meireki fire of 1657. The Fukiage is encircled by the Dōkan-bori to the Nishinomaru to the east, the Sakurada-bori to the south, the Hanzō-bori to the west, the Chidorigafuchi to the northwest and the Inui-bori to the north.

=== Inui-mon ===
The Inui-mon (乾門) was in the Nishinomaru area next to today's headquarters of the Imperial Household Agency and called Nishinomaru Ura-mon. It was moved to its present location between the Kitanomaru and Fukiage garden in the Meiji era. It has its name because it was in the northwestern part of the Imperial Palace grounds.

=== Hanzōmon ===
The Hanzōmon (半蔵門) is a gate in the kōrai style. The old gate was destroyed by fire during World War II. The Wadakura Gate was moved here in its stead. The Hanzō-mon is the only gate to the Fukiage area from outside today.

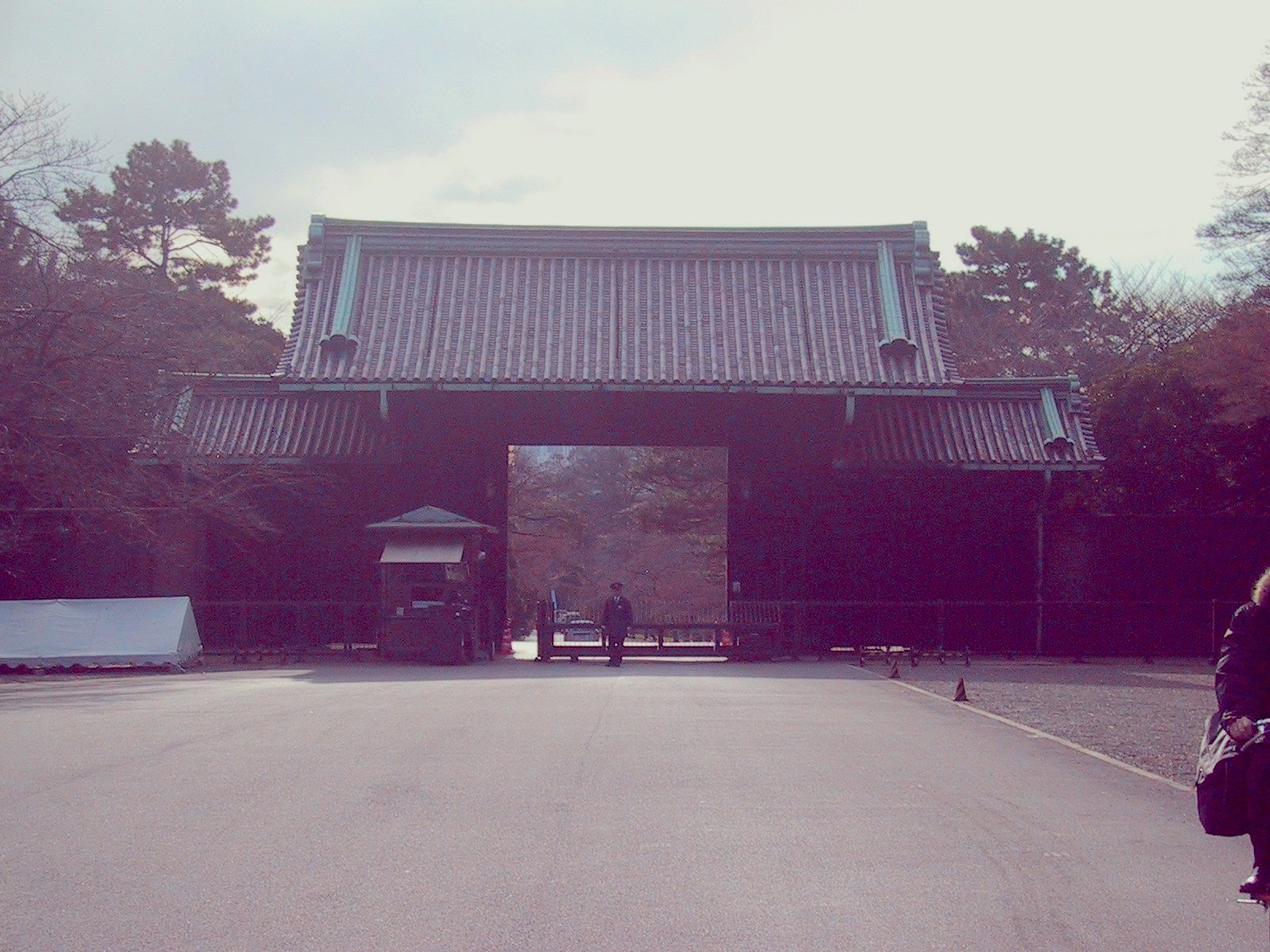
Inui-mon, former Nishinomaru Ura-mon

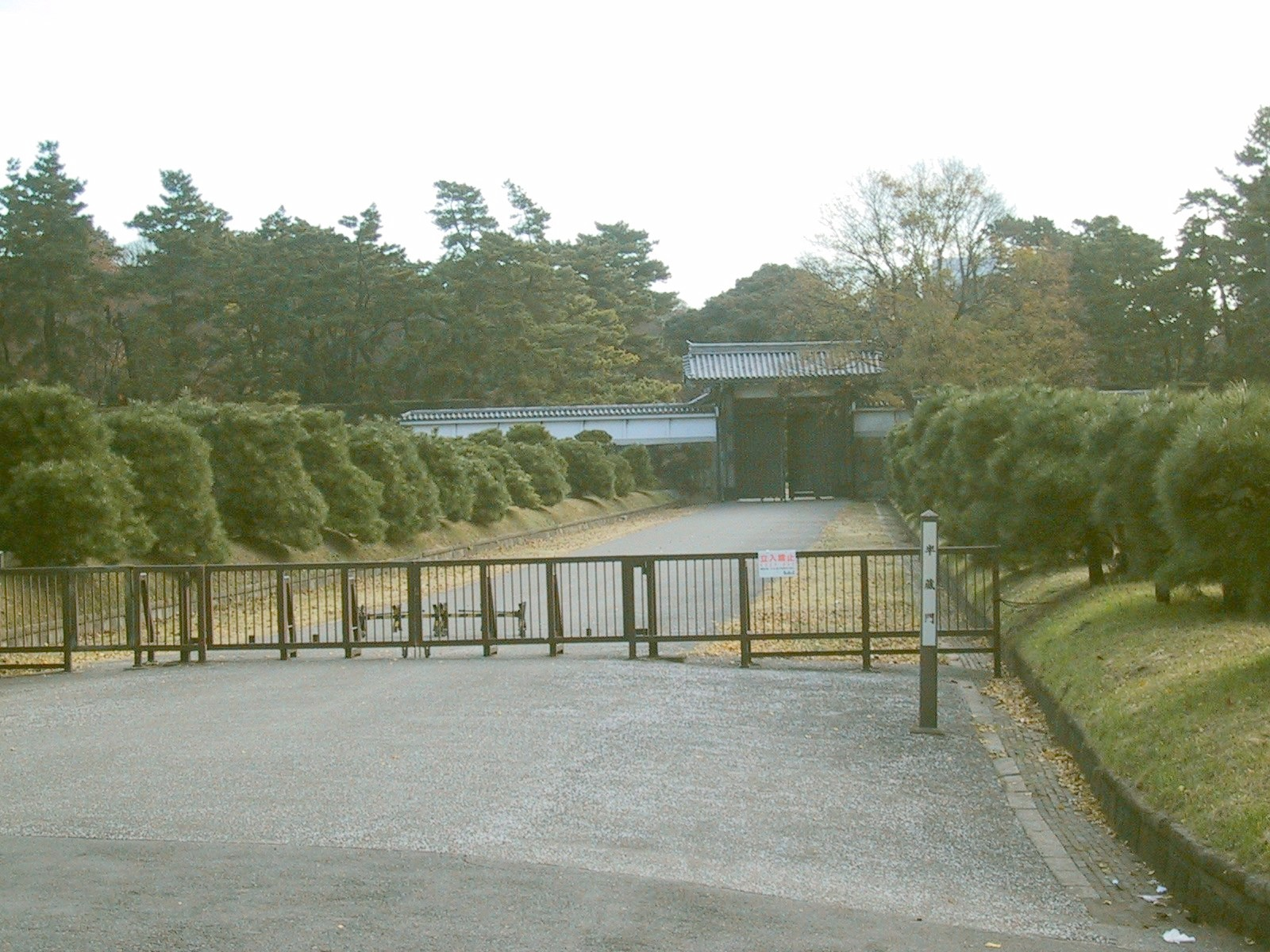
Hanzō-mon, former Wadakura Gate

== Kitanomaru ==
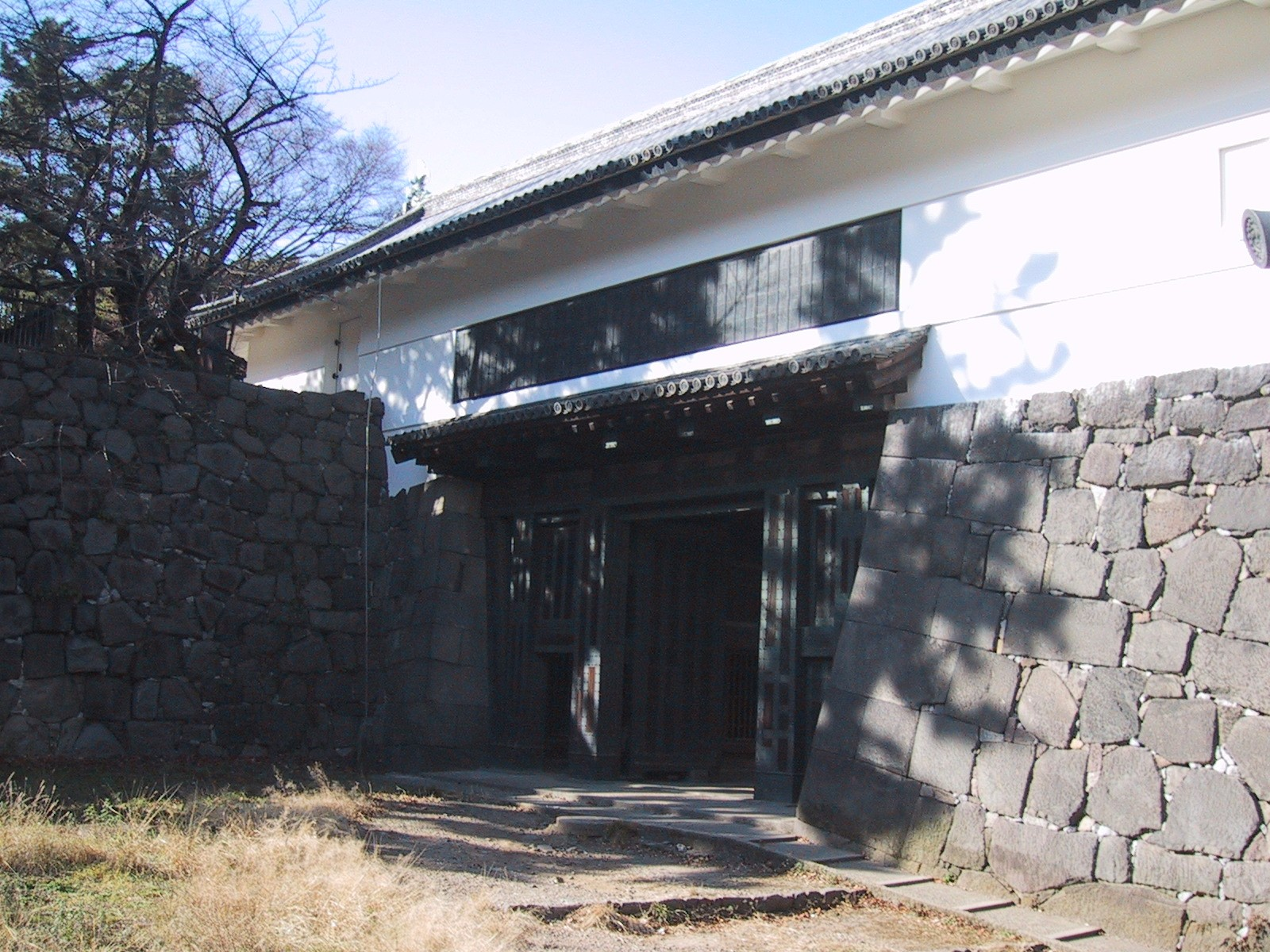
Shimizu-mon

The Kitanomaru (北の丸) is the northern enceinte next to the Honmaru. It was used as a medicinal garden (Ohanabatake) during the shōgun's rule. During the 17th century, the Suruga Dainagon residence was there as well, which was used by collateral branches of the Tokugawa clan. Today this site is the location of the public Kitanomaru Park. Not much is left from the times of the Edo Castle except for two gates, Shimizu-mon and further north Tayasu-mon.

Kitanomaru is surrounded by moats. The Inui-bori and Hirakawa-bori to the south separate it from the Honmaru and Chidorigafuchi to the west.

== Derived place names in Tokyo ==
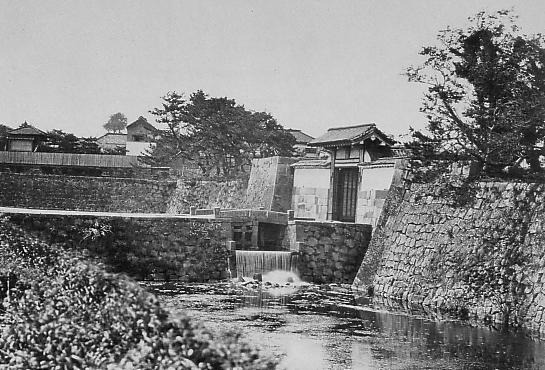
The Toranomon (Tiger Gate), demolished in the 1870s

Many place names in Tokyo derive from Edo Castle. Ōtemachi (大手町; "the town in front of the great gate"), Takebashi (竹橋; "the Bamboo Bridge"), Toranomon (虎ノ門; "the Tiger Gate"), Uchibori Dōri (内堀通り; "Inner Moat Street"), Sotobori Dōri (外堀通り; "Outer Moat Street"), and Marunouchi (丸の内; "Within the enclosure") are examples.

== See also ==
- Edo Castle Gates
- Kamiyashiki of Matsudaira Tadamasa
- List of Special Places of Scenic Beauty, Special Historic Sites and Special Natural Monuments
