= Edo Castle Gates =

Coordinates: 35°41′18″N 139°45′16″E

The Edo Castle gates (江戸城三十六見附) are the gates of Edo Castle in Tokyo, Japan. They were placed at crossing points (bridges) of the castle moats. Originally, there were 36 gates. Of these 36, 11 remain intact, including Sakurada Gate, while the rest have been demolished. Today, the central quarter of the castle is Tokyo Imperial Palace. Most gates in the palace are still intact, with gates on the moats leading into the palace still being used as security check points. However, all gates outside of the palace no longer exist. Some districts in Tokyo have been named after the castle gates.

== Gates ==
Name	Status	Image
浅草橋門 Asakusabashimon	Demolished	
筋違橋門 Suijikaibashimon	Demolished	
小石川門 Koishikawamon	Demolished	
牛込門 Ushigomemon	Demolished	
市谷門 Ichigayamon	Demolished	
四谷門 Yotsuyamon	Demolished	
喰違門 Kuichigaimon	Demolished	
赤坂門 Akasakamon	Demolished	
虎ノ門 Toranomon	Demolished	
幸橋門 Saiwaibashimon	Demolished	
山下門 Yamashitamon	Demolished	
数寄屋橋門 Sukiyabashimon	Demolished	
鍛冶橋門 Kajibashimon	Demolished	
呉服橋門 Gofukubashimon	Demolished	
常盤橋門 Tokiwabashimon	Demolished	
神田橋門 Kandabashimon	Demolished	
一ツ橋門 Hitotsubashimon	Demolished	
雉子橋門 Kijibashimon	Demolished	
竹橋門 Takebashimon	Demolished	
清水門 Shimizumon	Extant	
田安門 Tayasumon	Extant	
半蔵門 Hanzōmon	Extant	
桜田門 Sakuradamon	Extant	
日比谷門 Hibiyamon	Demolished	
馬場先門 Babasakimon	Demolished	
和田倉門 Wadakuramon	Demolished	
大手門 Ōtemon	Extant	
平川門 Hirakawamon	Extant	
北桔橋門 Kitahanebashimon	Extant	
西の丸大手門 Nishinomaruōtemon	Extant	
西の丸玄関門 Nishinomarugenkanmon	Extant	
坂下門 Sakashitamon	Extant	
桔梗門 Kikyōmon	Extant	
下乗門 Gejōmon	Demolished	
中之門 Nakanomon	Demolished	
中雀門 Chūjakumon	Demolished	
