= Hachisuka =

Hachisuka is a family name of Japanese origin and may refer to:

== People ==
- Hachisuka clan, extended Japanese family
  - Hachisuka Iemasa (1558–1639), Japanese daimyō
  - Hachisuka Haruaki (1758–1814), Japanese daimyō
  - Hachisuka Masakatsu (also named Hachisuka Koroku, 1526–1586), Japanese daimyō
  - Masako Hachisuka (born 1941), Japanese linguist
  - Masauji Hachisuka (1903–1953), Japanese ornithologist and aviculturist
  - Hachisuka Mitsutaka (1630–1666), Japanese daimyō
  - Hachisuka Mochiaki (1846–1918), Japanese daimyō and senior government official
  - Hachisuka Munekazu (1709–1735), Japanese daimyō
  - Hachisuka Muneshige (1721–1780), Japanese daimyō
  - Hachisuka Muneteru (1684–1743), Japanese daimyō
  - Hachisuka Narihiro (1821–1868), Japanese daimyō
  - Hachisuka Narimasa (1795–1859), Japanese daimyō
  - Hachisuka Shigeyoshi (1738–1801), Japanese daimyō
  - Hachisuka Tadateru (1611–1652), Japanese daimyō
  - Hachisuka Tsunamichi (1656–1678), Japanese daimyō
  - Hachisuka Tsunanori (1661–1730), Japanese daimyō
  - Hachisuka Yoshishige (1586–1620), Japanese daimyō
- Asuka Hachisuka (蜂須賀 明香; born 1992), Japanese biathlete
- Koji Hachisuka (born 1990), Japanese football player

== Places ==
- Hachisuka, near Kiso river at the border of Owari and Mino Provinces
- Hachisuka castle

== See also ==
- Hachisuka scroll
