= Hachisuka clan =

Branch of the Ashikaga clan

Hachisuka 蜂須賀
- The emblem (mon) of the Hachisuka clan
- Home province: Owari; Mino
- Parent house: Ashikaga clan Shiba clan
- Titles: Various
- Founder: Shiba Masaaki (Hachisuka Masaaki)
- Final ruler: Hachisuka Mochiaki
- Current head: Masako Hachisuka
- Founding year: 14th century
- Ruled until: 1871, Abolition of the han system

The Hachisuka clan (Japanese: 蜂須賀氏, Hepburn: Hachisuka-shi) are descendants of Emperor Seiwa (850-880) of Japan and are a branch of the Ashikaga clan through the Shiba clan (Seiwa Genji) of the Minamoto clan.

== History ==
Ashikaga Ieuji (13th century), son of Ashikaga Yasuuji, was the first to adopt the name Shiba. The Shiba were Shugo (Governors) of Echizen, Owari, and other provinces, and during the Ashikaga shogunate were one of three families (Shiba, Hosokawa and Hatakeyama) from which the Kyoto-kanryo (Prime Minister of the Shōgun) could be chosen. Shiba Masaaki, the descendant of Shiba Takatsune (1305–1367), established himself in Hachisuka, near the Kiso River at the border of Owari and Mino provinces, whence he took the name Hachisuka.

In the 16th century, the Hachisuka clan came to prominence thanks to its head, Hachisuka Koroku. His uncle held Hachisuka Castle and he lived first in Miyaushiro Castle, which was his mother's family home. Koroku served the Oda clan, being instrumental in several of the early victories of Oda Nobunaga. He later went on to serve under Toyotomi Hideyoshi.

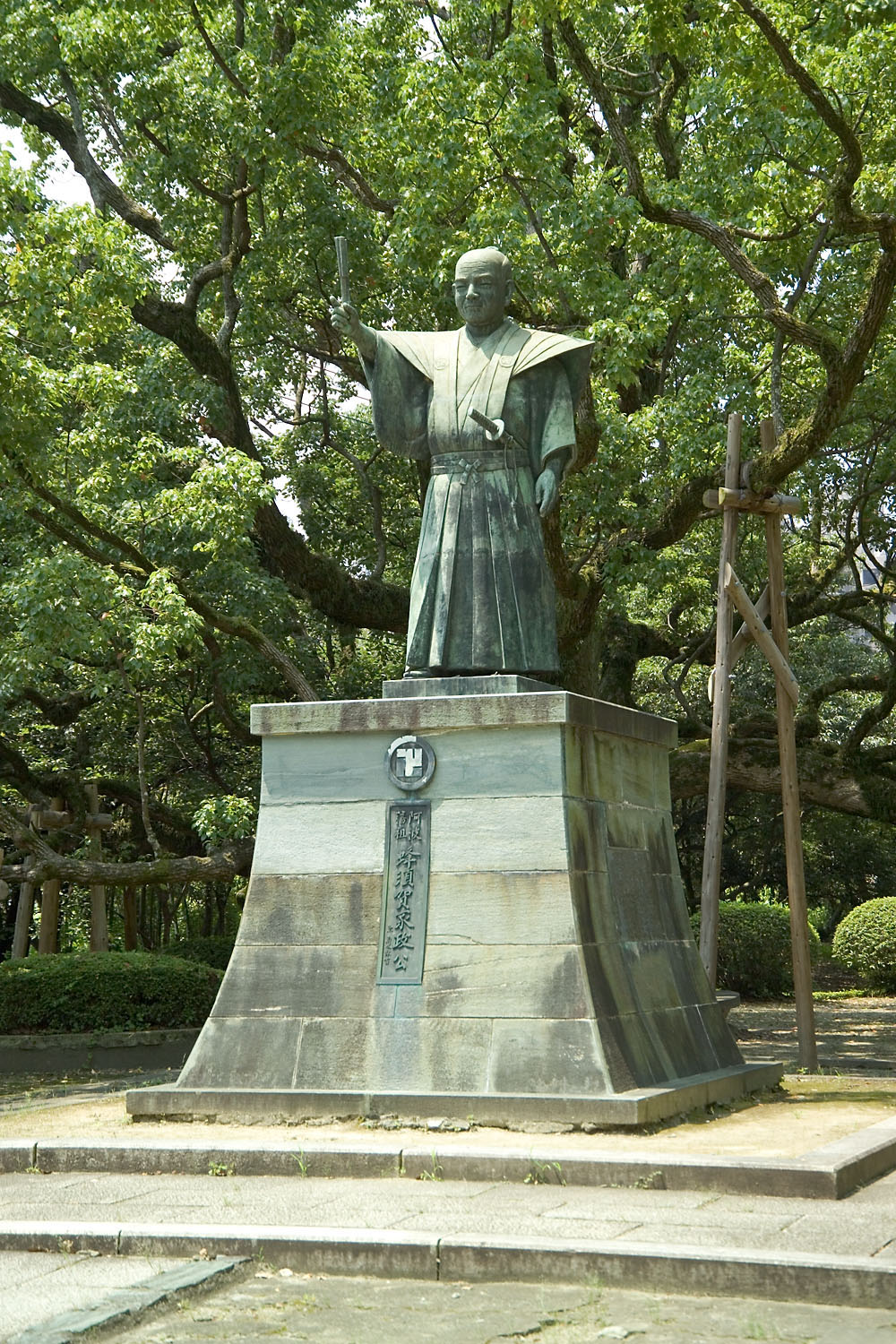
Statue of Hachisuka Iemasa, Tokushima

His son, Iemasa, received Tokushima Domain as a new landholding from Hideyoshi. From then until the end of the Edo period, the Hachisuka were the lords of Tokushima and Awa province in Shikoku. They would be one of the few clans to retain the same landholding from the start of the Edo period to its conclusion. They also managed to retain a constant income rating of 256,000 koku.

In the late Edo period, the clan came into national focus because of the contemporary head, Hachisuka Narihiro, who was a son of the 11th shogun, Ienari. The clan sided with the Kyoto government during the Boshin War and contributed troops to the fight in the north, as well as to security duties in Edo (Tokyo). The clan faced internal fragmentation a year later, in the form of the Inada Rebellion, and was peacefully dissolved in 1873 with the rest of the nation's han.

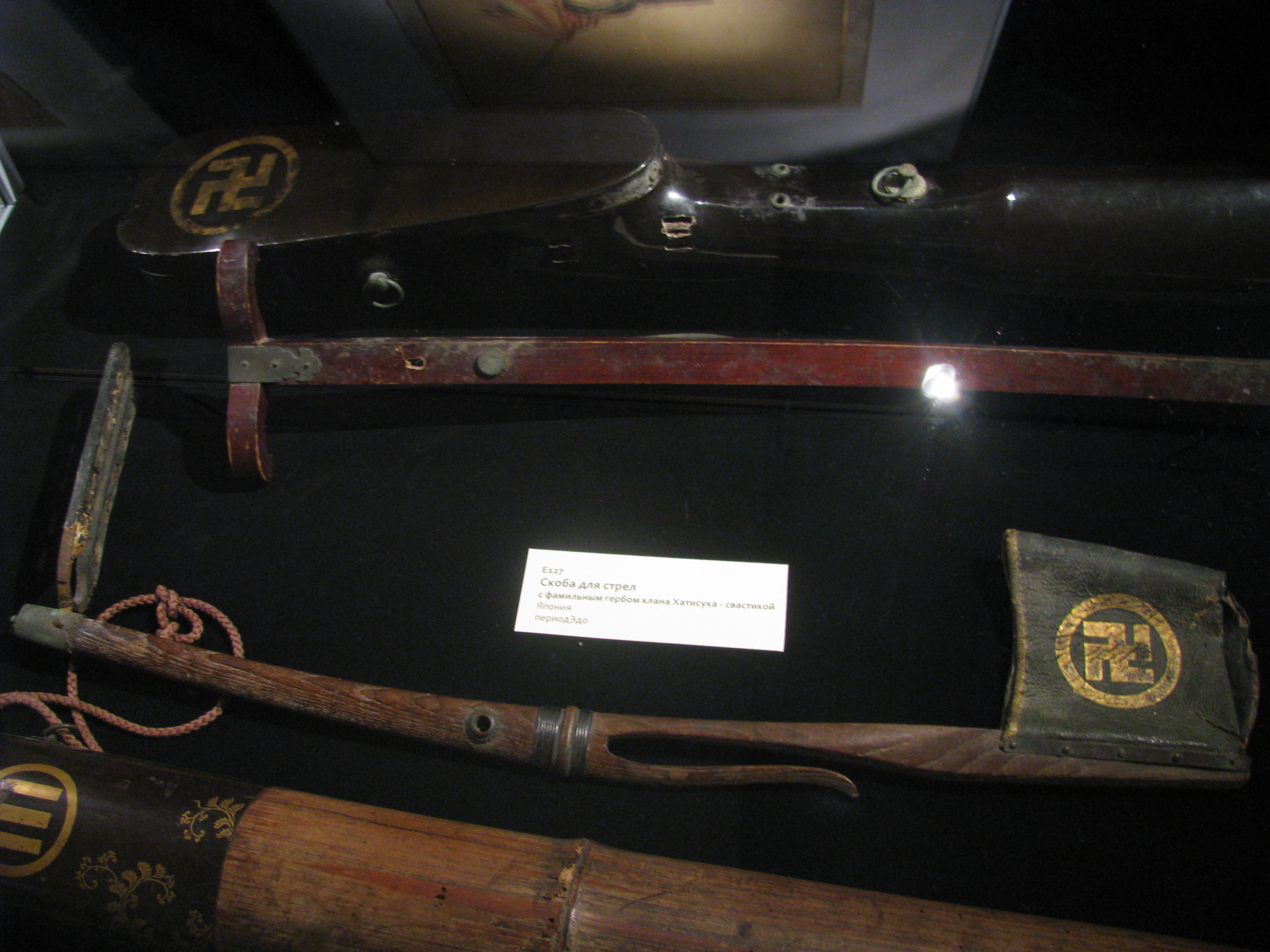
Arrow stands of Hachisuka clan

After the Meiji Restoration, the Hachisuka became part of the kazoku, Japan's new nobility system.

== Ancestors ==
1. Emperor Seiwa
2. Prince Sadazumi
3. Minamoto no Tsunemoto
4. Minamoto no Mitsunaka
5. Minamoto no Yorinobu
6. Minamoto no Yoriyoshi
7. Minamoto no Yoshiie
8. Minamoto no Yoshikuni
9. Minamoto no Yoshiyasu
10. Ashikaga Yoshikane
11. Ashikaga Yoshiuji (1189-1225)
12. Ashikaga Yasuuji (1216-1270)
13. Ashikaga Ieuji
14. Shiba Muneie (b.1250)
15. Shiba Muneuji
16. Shiba Takatsune

== Heads of the Family ==
1. Hachisuka Kagenari (son of Shiba Takatsune)
2. Masakazu (adopted)
3. Masataka
4. Masanaga
5. Masaaki
6. Masamori
7. Masatoshi (d.1553)
8. Hachisuka Masakatsu
9. Hachisuka Iemasa
10. Hachisuka Yoshishige
11. Hachisuka Tadateru
12. Hachisuka Mitsutaka
13. Hachisuka Tsunamichi
14. Hachisuka Tsunanori
15. Hachisuka Munekazu
16. Hachisuka Muneteru
17. Hachisuka Muneshige
18. Hachisuka Yoshihiro
19. Hachisuka Shigeyoshi
20. Hachisuka Haruaki
21. Hachisuka Narimasa
22. Hachisuka Narihiro
23. Hachisuka Mochiaki
24. Masaaki (1871-1932)
25. Masauji Hachisuka
26. Masako Hachisuka
