= Sanjō Sanetomi =

Japanese politician (1837–1891)

Senior First Rank Prince Sanjō Sanetomi
- 三条 実美
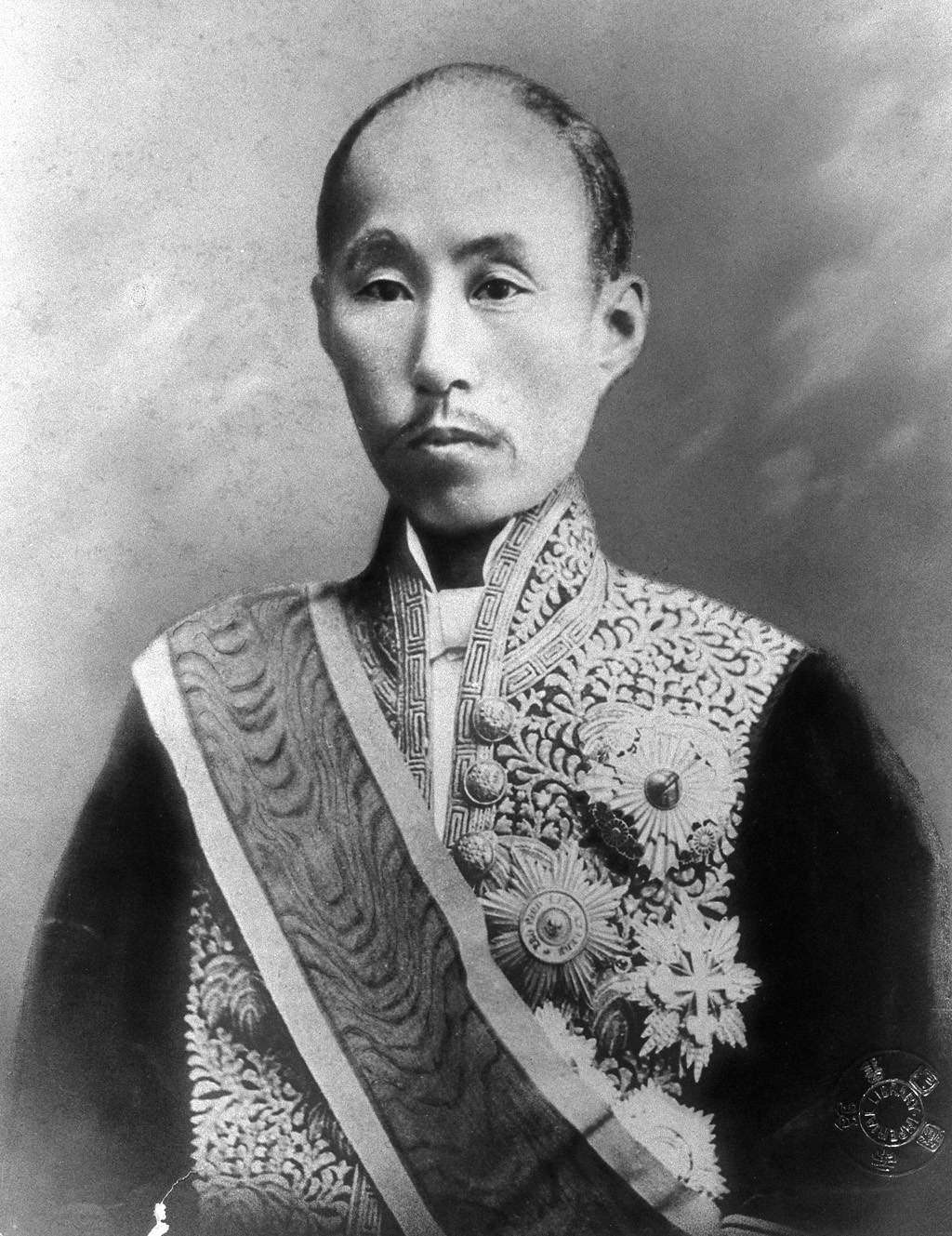

Caretaker Prime Minister of Japan
- In office 25 October 1889 – 24 December 1889
- Monarch: Meiji
- Preceded by: Kuroda Kiyotaka
- Succeeded by: Yamagata Aritomo

Lord Keeper of the Privy Seal
- In office 22 December 1885 – 18 February 1891
- Monarch: Meiji
- Preceded by: Position established
- Succeeded by: Tokudaiji Sanetsune

Chancellor of the Realm of Japan
- In office 13 September 1871 – 22 December 1885
- Monarch: Meiji
- Preceded by: Takatsukasa Masamichi (1848)
- Succeeded by: Position abolished

Minister of the Right
- In office 13 July 1868 – 13 September 1871
- Monarch: Meiji
- Preceded by: Ōinomikado Iekoto
- Succeeded by: Iwakura Tomomi

Member of the House of Peers
- In office February 1890 – 18 February 1891 Hereditary peerage

Personal details
- Born: 13 March 1837 Kyoto, Yamashiro, Japan
- Died: 18 February 1891 (aged 53) Roppongi, Tokyo, Japan

Japanese name
- Kanji: 三条 実美
Transcriptions
- Romanization: Sanjō Sanetomi

Prince Sanjō Sanetomi (三条 実美; 13 March 1837 – 18 February 1891) was a Japanese Imperial court noble and statesman at the time of the Meiji Restoration. He held many high-ranking offices in the Meiji government.

== Early life ==
Born in Kyoto, Sanjō was the son of Naidaijin Sanjō Sanetsumu. He held several important posts in Court and became a central figure in the anti-Western, anti-Tokugawa sonnō jōi ("Revere the Emperor, Expel the Barbarian") movement.

When the coup d'état of 30 September 1863, brought the more moderate Aizu and Satsuma factions into power, he fled to Chōshū. He returned to Kyoto after the resignation of shōgun Tokugawa Yoshinobu in 1867.

== Political career ==
The first administrative offices (Sanshoku) of the Meiji government were established on 3 January 1868: the Sōsai (President), Gijō (Administration) and San'yo (Office of Councilors). These offices were abolished on 11 June 1868, with the establishment of the Dajō-kan (Grand Council of State). In the new Meiji government, Sanjō was head of the Gijo, Minister of the Right (右大臣) (11 June 1868 – 15 August 1871), and Chancellor of the Realm (Dajō-daijin) (15 August 1871 – 22 December 1885).

Sanjō was awarded Grand Cordon of the Supreme Order of the Chrysanthemum in 1882. On 7 July 1884, his title was changed to that of koshaku (prince) under the kazoku peerage system. Sanjō served until the abolition of the dajōkan system in 1885. After the Cabinet system was established, he became Lord Keeper of the Privy Seal of Japan.

In 1889, when Prime Minister Kuroda Kiyotaka and his cabinet resigned en masse, Emperor Meiji only accepted Kuroda's resignation and formally invited Sanjō to head the government. The Emperor refused to appoint a new prime minister for the next two months, making Sanjō the only Prime Minister of Japan (albeit interim) who also concurrently held the post of Lord Keeper of the Privy Seal.

In 1890, he assumed a seat in the new House of Peers in the Diet of Japan established by the Meiji Constitution. On his death in 1891, he was accorded a state funeral. His grave is at the temple of Gokoku-ji in Bunkyō, Tokyo.

== Honours ==
From the corresponding article in the Japanese Wikipedia

- Grand Cordon of the Order of the Rising Sun (29 December 1876)
- Grand Cordon of the Order of the Chrysanthemum (11 April 1882)
- Prince (7 July 1884)

=== Order of precedence ===
- Junior fifth rank (31 January 1850)
- Fifth rank (4 July 1854)
- Fourth rank (22 May 1855)
- Senior fourth rank (29 January 1856)
- Third rank (6 November 1862; degraded 1863, restored 2 January 1868)
- First rank (12 June 1868)
- Senior first rank (18 February 1891)

== Ancestry ==
Ancestors of Sanjō Sanetomi

16.Sanjō Sueharu (1733–1782)
8. Sanjō Saneoki (1756–1823)
17. Ii
4. Sanjō Kinosa (1774–1840)
18. Hachisuka Muneshige, 8th Lord of Tokushima (1721–1780)
9. Hachisuka Yoshiko (1753–1774)
19. Oze
2. Sanjō Sanetsumu (1802–1859)
20. Ichijō Michika (1722–1769)
10. Ichijō Teruyoshi (1756–1795)
21. Ikeda Shizuko
5. Ichijō Masako (1776–1841)
22. Tokugawa Shigenori, 8th Lord of Kishū (1746–1829)
11. Tokugawa Atsuhime
23. Sasaki Fusanokata
1. Sanjō Sanetomi (1837–1891)
24. Yamauchi Toyonobu, 8th Lord of Tosa (1712–1768)
12. Yamauchi Toyochika, 9th Lord of Tosa (1750–1789)
25. Isasa Megumi
6. Yamauchi Toyokazu, 10th Lord of Tosa (1773–1825)
26. Mōri Shigetaka, 8th Lord of Chōshū
13. Mōri Yuhime (1749–1780)
27. Tachibana Toyo
3. Yamauchi Noriko (1803–1872)
14. Masui Minoru
7. Masui Hisae

== Notes ==
Political offices
Preceded by Tokugawa Ienari	Chancellor of the Realm of Japan; 1871–1885	Position abolished
Preceded by Kuroda Kiyotaka	Prime Minister of Japan; Acting; 1889	Succeeded by Yamagata Aritomo
