= Sukemasa =

- Gender: Male

Origin
- Origin: Japanese
- Meaning: Different meanings depending on the kanji used

Sukemasa (written: 亮政, 輔政, 資昌 or 佐理) is a masculine Japanese given name. Notable people with the name include:

- Azai Sukemasa (浅井 亮政) (1491–1546), Japanese samurai and daimyō
- Fujiwara no Sukemasa (藤原 佐理) (944–998), Japanese calligrapher
- Matsudaira Sukemasa (松平 資昌) (1744–1762), Japanese daimyō
- Takatsukasa Sukemasa (鷹司 輔政) (1849-1867), Japanese kugyō
