= Takatsukasa Sukemasa =

Takatsukasa Sukemasa (鷹司 輔政; August 18, 1849 – September 11, 1867), son of regent Sukehiro, was a Kugyō or Japanese court noble of the late Tokugawa shogunate and early Meiji periods. Among his consorts was a daughter of Hachisuka Narihiro, the thirteenth head of Tokushima Domain. In September 1867 he died at age 19.
