= Masauji Hachisuka =

Japanese nobleman, ornithologist and aviculturist

- 蜂須賀 正氏
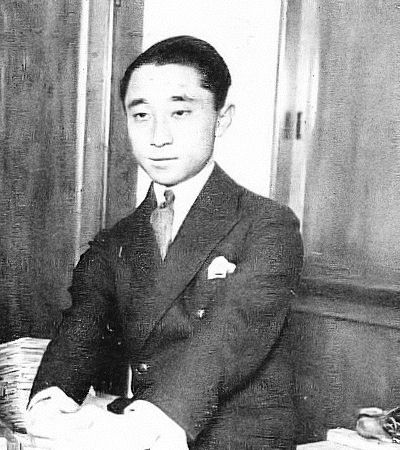
- Hachisuka in 1929
- Born: February 15, 1903; Tokyo, Japan
- Died: May 14, 1953 (aged 50); Atami, Japan
- Education: Cambridge University
- Scientific career
- Fields: Zoology, Ornithology
- Author abbrev. (zoology): Hachisuka

Masauji Hachisuka (蜂須賀 正氏, Hachisuka Masauji; February 15, 1903 Tokyo – May 14, 1953 Atami), 18th Marquess Hachisuka, was a Japanese nobleman, ornithologist and aviculturist.

== Biography ==
Hachisuka was born in Tokyo on February 15, 1903 to Lady Hachisuka Fudeko and Marquess Hachisuka Masaaki, a marquis and Vice-Chairman of the House of Peers. He was the great grandson of the 11th shōgun Tokugawa Ienari, and the nephew of the last shōgun Prince Tokugawa.

He attended the Gakushūin (学習院), or Peers' School, in Tokyo before moving to England at age 19 to complete his education. In England he was supported by Baron Hayashi Gonsuke, the Japanese Ambassador in London and a friend of his father’s, and was admitted in 1924 to study zoology at Magdalene College, Cambridge. While at Cambridge, his interest in birds grew considerably with encouragement from naturalist Dr. Francis Guillemard and British ornithologist A. H. Evans, leading him to join the British Ornithologists' Union and attend British Ornithologists' Club dinners.

As an undergraduate, Hachisuka went on expeditions to Iceland in 1925 (with his A Handbook of the Birds of Iceland being published a few years later in 1927) and to North Africa with German ornithologist Dr. Ernst Hartert in 1927. Although obituaries by his friends reference his having graduated in 1927, there are no records of him ever having taken the preliminary examinations or of his graduation. In 1927, he returned to Japan through the United States with French ornithologist Jean Théodore Delacour, with whom he would later go on to visit China and Korea.

In February 1928, Hachisuka founded the Japanese Biogeographical Society with Japanese zoologist Watase Shozaburo. He conducted an expedition to the Philippine Islands from 1928 to 1929 to study the distribution of the local avifauna, after which he brought collections made during the expedition with him back to London, working with them at the Natural History Museum in London and the Natural History Museum at Tring. The results of his study were a two-volume work, Contributions to the Birds of the Philippines published in 1929-30, and a four-volume work, The Birds of the Philippine Islands published across at least four volumes from 1931 to 1935. He also wrote about the birds of Egypt, Iceland, Hainan and Formosa. Around 1930, Hachisuka became a Corresponding Fellow of the American Ornithologists' Union, travelled to the Belgian Congo with Belgian zoologist Dr. Jean-Marie Derscheid, and reportedly visited with the Bulgarian royal family.

Hachisuka's father, Hachisuka Masaaki, died on December 31, 1932. Although he intended to return to Japan to take up his position as head of the family after his father's death, he fell ill in Los Angeles and was forced to remain there for several years, living in or near Pasadena, California. He returned to Japan in October 1937. While in California, he met a Japanese woman from Los Angeles, Chiyeko Nagamine, and the two were married in Japan on March 7, 1939. The couple had one daughter, Hachisuka Masako.

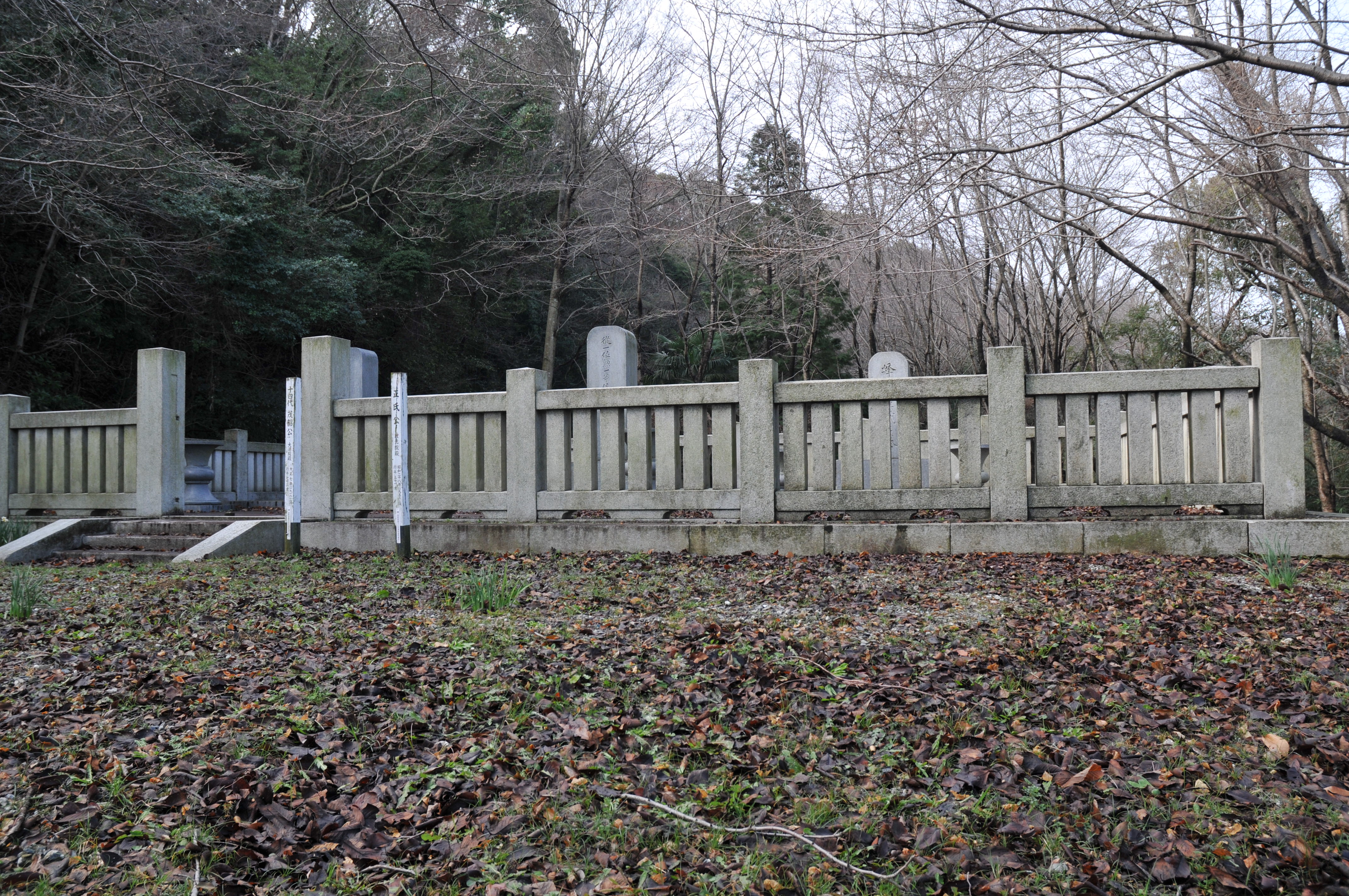
Hachisuka family grave

After World War II, he had reportedly lost much of his wealth, although he was able to have a Moorish style home built for himself in Atami where he lived and worked. He continued to keep and raise birds, particularly pheasants. As of 1943, he had apparently imported four screamers (family Anhimidae) to Atami, being the first to keep them in captivity in Japan, and he raised them for several years.

Hachisuka described several species and subspecies throughout his career, some of which are still accepted today. In 1937, he and Delacour published the description of the green-faced parrotfinch (Erythrura viridifacies). In 1941, Hachisuka described and named the grey-hooded sunbird (Aethopyga primigenia). In The Birds of the Philippine Islands, Hachisuka described several subspecies of birds found in the Philippines, including subspecies of the black-faced coucal (Centropus melanops banken) and the Mindanao blue fantail (Rhipidura superciliaris apo).

Hachisuka wrote an account of the birds of the Mascarene Islands, particularly the dodo, and was in the early stages of writing a book about the birds of China when he died after suffering from a heart ailment on May 14, 1953. His work on Mascarene Island avifauna, The Dodo and Kindred Birds, was published posthumously in 1953.

== Ancestry ==
Hachisuka's uncle Tokugawa Yoshinobu was the last shogun of Tokugawa.

Ancestors of Masauji Hachisuka

16. Tokugawa Ienari, 11th Tokugawa Shōgun (1773-1841)
8. Hachisuka Narihiro, 13th Lord of Tokushima (1821-1868)
17. Kaishun'in (d. 1843)
4. Marquess Hachisuka Mochiaki, 14th Lord of Tokushima (1846-1921)
18. Takatsukasa Masamichi (1789-1868)
9. Takatsukasa Shinako (1820-1858)
2. Marquess Hachisuka Masaaki (1871-1932)
20. Tokugawa Nariaki, 9th Lord of Mito (1800-1860)
10. Tokugawa Yoshiatsu, 10th Lord of Mito (1832-1868)
21. Princess Arisugawa Yoshiko (1804-1893)
5. Tokugawa Yoriko (1854-1923)
22. Prince Arisugawa Takahito (1812-1886)
11. Princess Arisugawa Takako (1835-1856)
23. Yamanishi Chise
1. Marquess Hachisuka Masauji
24. Tokugawa Harutoshi, 7th Lord of Mito (1773-1816)
12. Tokugawa Nariaki, 9th Lord of Mito (1800-1860)
25. Toyama Ei
6. Prince Tokugawa Yoshinobu, 15th Tokugawa Shōgun (1837-1913)
26. Prince Arisugawa Orihito (1754-1820)
13. Princess Arisugawa Yoshiko (1804-1893)
27. Andō Kiyoko
3. Lady Tokugawa Fudeko (1876-1907)
14. Nakane Yoshisaburō
7. Nakane Sachi (1836-1915)
