= Hachisuka Mochiaki =

Japanese politician

Marquess Hachisuka Mochiaki
- 蜂須賀 茂韶
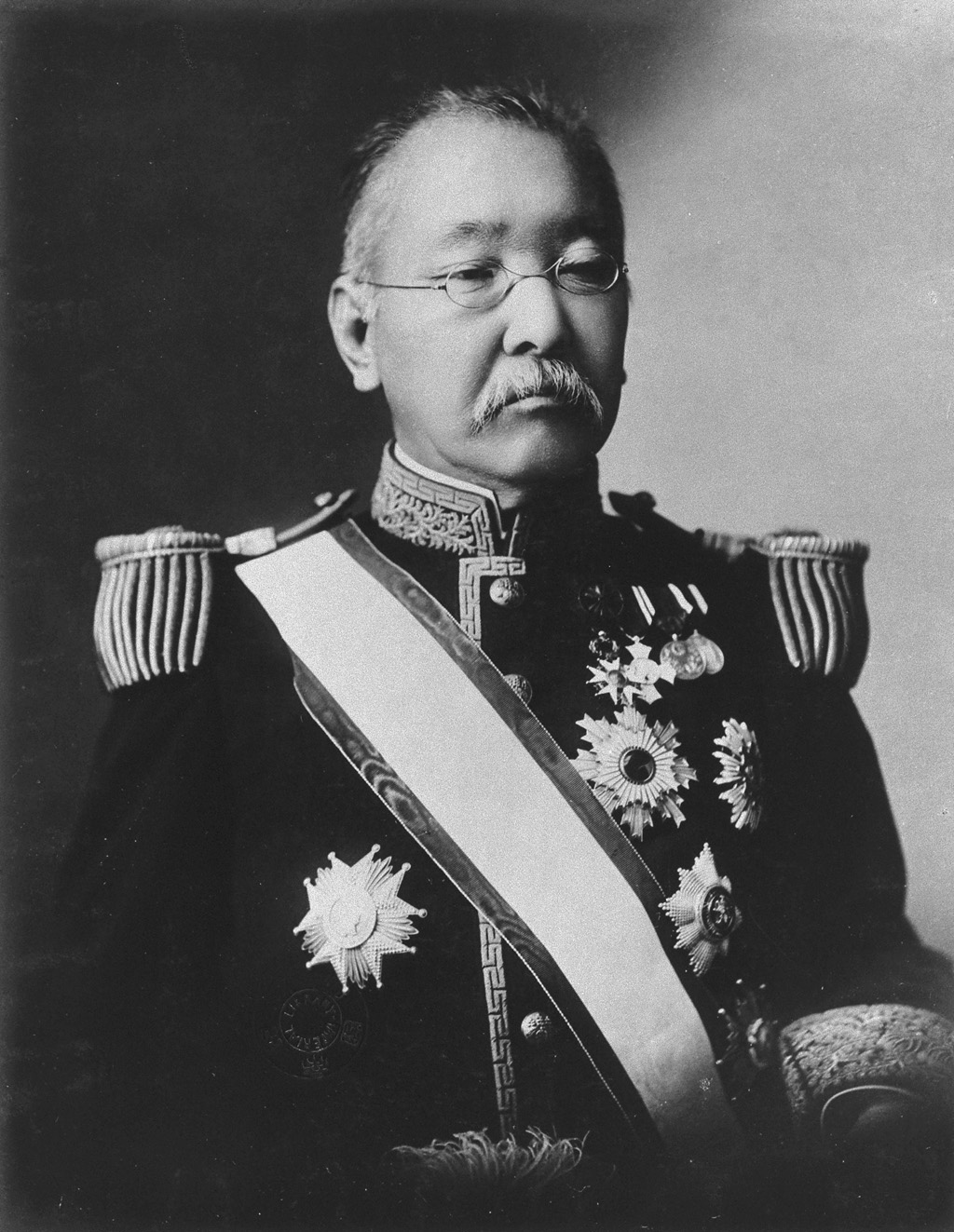

Minister of Education
- In office 28 September 1896 – 6 November 1897
- Prime Minister: Matsukata Masayoshi
- Preceded by: Saionji Kinmochi
- Succeeded by: Hamao Arata

President of the House of Peers
- In office 21 July 1891 – 3 October 1896
- Monarch: Meiji
- Vice President: Higashikuze Michitomi; Hosokawa Junjirō; Saionji Kinmochi; Nagashige Kuroda
- Preceded by: Itō Hirobumi
- Succeeded by: Konoe Atsumaro

Member of the Privy Council
- In office 6 November 1897 – 10 February 1918
- Monarchs: Meiji; Taishō

Member of the House of Peers
- In office February 1890 – 10 February 1918 Hereditary peerage

Member of the Genrōin
- In office 7 June 1888 – 19 May 1890

Governor of Tokyo
- In office 19 May 1890 – 21 July 1891
- Monarch: Meiji
- Preceded by: Takasaki Goroku
- Succeeded by: Tomita Tetsunosuke

Governor of Tokushima Domain
- In office 24 June 1869 – 14 July 1871
- Monarch: Meiji
- Preceded by: Himself (as Daimyō of Tokushima)
- Succeeded by: Position abolished

Daimyō of Tokushima Domain
- In office 6 January 1868 – 24 June 1869
- Shōgun: Tokugawa Yoshinobu
- Preceded by: Hachisuka Narihiro
- Succeeded by: Himself (as Governor of Tokushima)

Personal details
- Born: 28 September 1846 Edo, Japan
- Died: 10 February 1918 (aged 71) Tokyo, Japan
- Parent: Hachisuka Narihiro (father)
- Relatives: Tokugawa Ienari (grandfather)
- Education: University of Oxford

Marquess Hachisuka Mochiaki (蜂須賀 茂韶; 28 September 1846 – 10 February 1918) was the 14th and final daimyō of Tokushima Domain, Awa Province, and the 2nd President of the House of Peers in Meiji period Japan.

== Early life ==
Hachisuka was born at the Hachisuka domain residence in Edo, as the eldest son of the 13th daimyō Hachisuka Narihiro (1821–1868). Hachisuka Narihiro was the 22nd child of shōgun Tokugawa Ienari, and was adopted into the Hachisuka clan as the 12th daimyō, Hachisuka Narimasa was childless. Thus, Mochiaki was the grandson of Tokugawa Ienari, nephew of Tokugawa Ieyoshi and cousin of Tokugawa Iesada and Iemochi.

However, when his father suddenly died in 1868 and he became heir, Japan was already in the midst of the Boshin War leading to the Meiji Restoration. Quick to see the direction in which the wind was blowing, he pledged loyalty to the Imperial forces, and led his troops against Tokugawa partisans in Mutsu Province. His forces were armed with western rifles and accompanied by British military advisors, giving him a much greater strength than their small numbers might have indicated.

== Political career ==
In 1869, with the hanseki hokan (Abolition of the han system), he was appointed Governor of Tokushima Prefecture.

In 1872, Hachisuka went to Great Britain and attended Oxford University, where he enrolled at Balliol College in 1874. After returning to Japan, he joined the government as Director of the Customs Bureau director in the Ministry of Finance and a member of Sanjiin (legislative advisory council).

In 1882, Hachisuka was envoy extraordinary and minister plenipotentiary to France, and received the title of kōshaku (marquis) under the new kazoku peerage system. After returning to Japan, he served as a member of the House of Peers, Governor of Tokyo Prefecture, President of the House of Peers, Minister of Education, and Privy Councillor.

He died in 1918, and his grave is located in Tokushima.

== Honours ==
Translated from the corresponding article in the Japanese Wikipedia

- Marquess (7 July 1884)
- Grand Cordon of the Order of the Sacred Treasure (14 March 1896)
- Grand Cordon of the Order of the Rising Sun (26 December 1903) (Second Class: 25 November 1887; Third Class: 16 July 1881)
- Grand Cordon of the Order of the Rising Sun with Paulownia Flowers (10 February 1918; posthumous)

=== Order of precedence ===
- Fourth rank (April 1860)
- Second rank (21 April 1868)
- Senior second rank (20 December 1895)
- First rank (10 February 1918; posthumous)

== Personal life ==
Hachisuka Mochiaki ran an experimental farm in Hokkaidō, as he often stated that the nobility needed to have some gainful employment other than government service. He also enjoyed haiku poetry and noh drama and actively promoted these traditional arts.

== Family ==
- Father: Hachisuka Narihiro
- Mother: Takatsukasa Shinako (1820–1858)
- Wives:
  - Ayahime
  - Yoriko (1854–1923)
- Concubine: unknown
- Child: Hachisuka Masaaki (1871–1932)

== Ancestry ==
Ancestors of Hachisuka Mochiaki

16. Tokugawa Munetada, 1st Hitotsubashi-Tokugawa family head (1721–1765)
8. Tokugawa Harusada, 2nd Hitotsubashi-Tokugawa family head (1751–1827)
17. Hosoda (O-Yukanokata)
4. Tokugawa Ienari, 11th Tokugawa shōgun (1773–1841)
18. Iwamoto Masatoshi
9. O-Tominokata (d. 1817)
19. Umeda
2. Hachisuka Narihiro, 13th Lord of Tokushima (1821–1868)
10. Makino Tadakatsu
5. Kaishun'in (d. 1843)
1. Marquess Hachisuka Mochiaki, 14th Lord of Tokushima
24. Takatsukasa Sukehira (1738–1813)
12. Takatsukasa Masahiro (1761–1841)
25. Mori Sayo (1746–1769)
6. Takatsukasa Masamichi (1789–1868)
26. Hachisuka Shigeyoshi, 10th Lord of Tokushima (1738–1801)
13. Hachisuka Noriko (1771–1795)
27. Yanada
3. Takatsukasa Shinako (1820–1858)

== Reference and further reading ==
- Beasley, W. G. The Meiji Restoration. Stanford: Stanford University Press, 1972.
- Cobbing, Andrew. The Japanese Discovery of Victorian Britain. RoutledgeCurzon, London, 1998. ISBN 1-873410-81-6
- Fraser, Andrew. Japan's Early Parliaments, 1890–1905. Routledge(1995). ISBN 0-415-03075-7
- Koyama Noboru. Japanese Students at Cambridge University in the Meiji Era, 1868–1912: Pioneers for the Modernization of Japan. Lulu.com (2004). ISBN 1-4116-1256-6

Preceded by Hachisuka Narihiro	14th (Hachisuka) Lord of Tokushima; 1868–1871	Succeeded by none (domain abolished)
Preceded by Hachisuka Narihiro	Hachisuka family head 1868–1871	Succeeded by Hachisuka Masaaki
Preceded by Takasaki Goroku	Governor of Tokyo; 1890–1891	Succeeded by Tomita Tetsunosuke
Preceded by Itō Hirobumi	President of the House of Peers; 1891–1896	Succeeded by Konoe Atsumaro
Preceded by Saionji Kinmochi	Minister of Education; 1896–1897	Succeeded by Hamao Arata
