= Hachisuka Muneteru =

Japanese daimyō

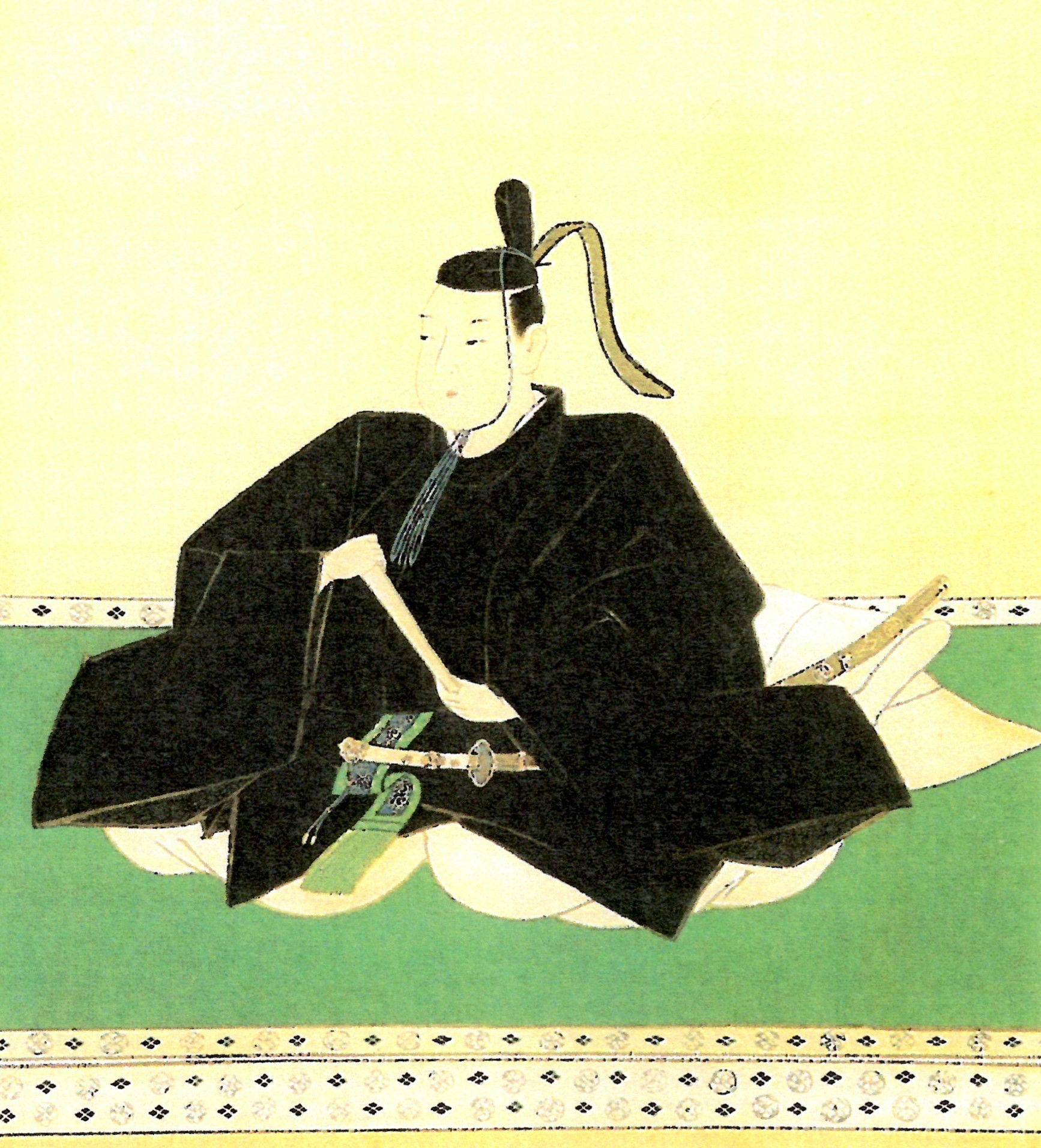

Hachisuka Muneteru (蜂須賀 宗英) (May 23, 1684 – March 24, 1743) was a Japanese daimyō of the Edo period, who ruled the Tokushima Domain. His court title was Awa no kami.

== Family ==
- Father: Hachisuka Takayoshi (1643–1698)
- Concubine: unknown
- Children:
  - Daughter
  - daughter married Higashizono Motoaki

== Ancestry ==
Ancestors of Hachisuka Muneteru

16. Hachisuka Iemasa (1558-1639)
8. Hachisuka Yoshishige, 1st Lord of Tokushima (1586-1620)
17. Jikōin (1563-1606)
4. Hachisuka Tadateru, 2nd Lord of Tokushima (1611-1652)
18. Ogasawara Hidemasa, 1st Lord of Matsumoto (1569-1615)
9. Kyōdaiin (1592-1666)
19. Tokuhime (1576-1607)
2. Hachisuka Takayoshi (1643-1698)
10. Hosoya Iemon
5. Tenzuiin
1. Hachisuka Muneteru, 7th Lord of Tokushima

Preceded by Hachisuka Munekazu	7th (Hachisuka) lord of Tokushima; 1735–1739	Succeeded by Hachisuka Muneshige
