= Hachisuka Narimasa =

Japanese daimyo

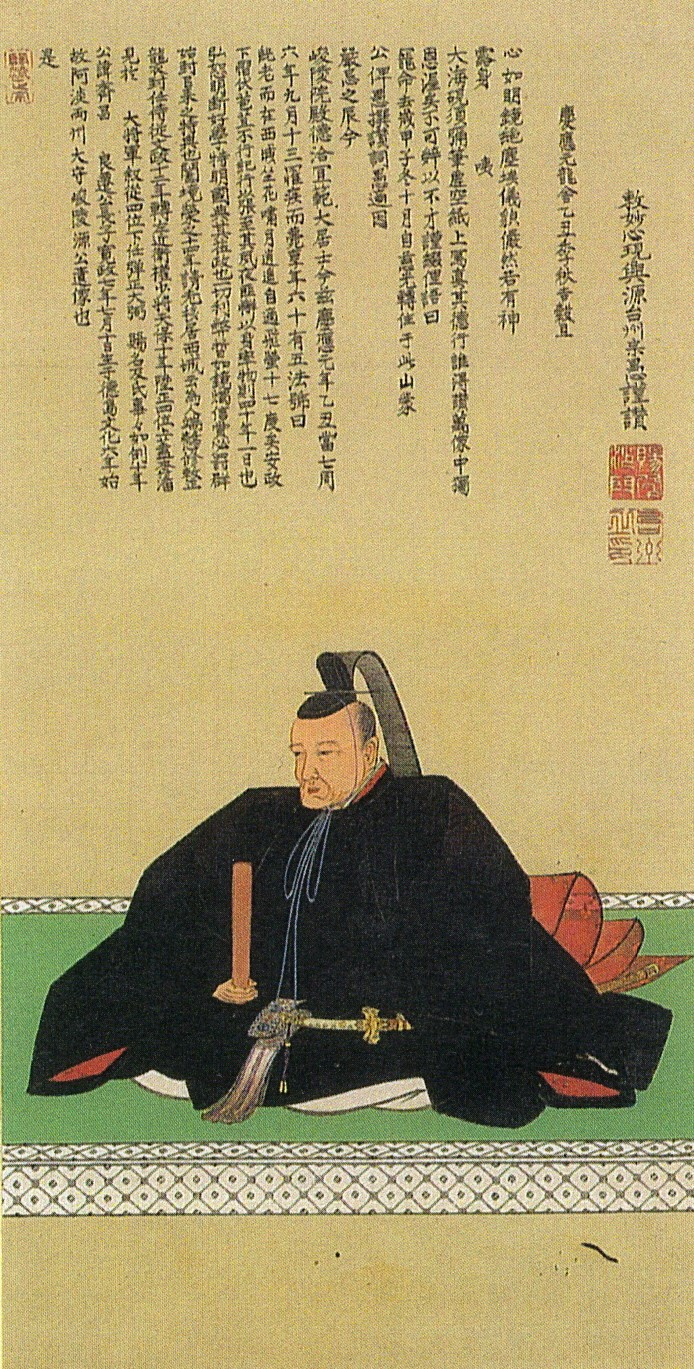

Hachisuka Narimasa (蜂須賀 斉昌) (August 24, 1795 – October 8, 1859) was a Japanese Daimyo of the Late Edo period, who ruled the Tokushima Domain. His court title was Awa no kami.

== Family ==
- Father: Hachisuka Haruaki
- Mother: Tsuyo no Kata
- Wives:
  - Jouhime (1792-1820) daughter of Ii Naonaka
  - Takatsukasa Tsuneko (1799-1837) daughter of Takatsukasa Masahiro (adopting Hachisuka Narihiro and Hachisuka Kazuko)
- Concubines:
  - Miyake-dono
  - Koda-dono

== Ancestry ==
Ancestors of Hachisuka Narimasa

16. Satake Yoshimoto (1675-1752)
8. Satake Yoshimichi, 2nd Lord of Kubota-Shinden (1701-1765)
17. Koga
4. Hachisuka Shigeyoshi, 10th Lord of Tokushima (1738-1801)
18. Naitō Masamori, 1st Lord of Annaka (1683-1738)
9. Naitō
19. Soshi
2. Hachisuka Haruaki, 11th Lord of Tokushima (1758-1814)
20. Tachibana Shigetaka
10. Tachibana Sadayoshi, 5th Lord of Yanagawa (1698-1744)
21. Tachibana Yuzumiin
5. Tachibana Tsutehime
11. Nagaya Mine
1. Hachisuka Narimasa, 12th Lord of Tokushima
3. Tsuyo

Preceded by Hachisuka Haruaki	12th (Hachisuka) Lord of Tokushima; 1813–1843	Succeeded by Hachisuka Narihiro
