= Takatsukasa Sukehiro =

Takatsukasa Sukehiro (鷹司 輔煕; December 5, 1807 – November 19, 1878), son of regent Masamichi, was a kugyō or Japanese court noble of the late Tokugawa shogunate and early Meiji periods. He held a regent position kampaku in 1863. After his biological son Sukemasa died young, he adopted a son of Kujō Hisatada, Hiromichi. In August 1872 he retired, and in November 1878 he died at age 70.

Preceded by Konoe Tadahiro	Kampaku; 1863–1866	Succeeded by Nijō Nariyuki
