= Takatsukasa Masahiro =

Japanese court noble

Takatsukasa Masahiro (鷹司 政煕; May 14, 1761 – March 29, 1841) was a Japanese court noble of the Edo period. He held the regent position of kampaku from 1795-1814.

== Biography ==
Masahiro was born the son of regent Takatsukasa Sukehira.

He served as kampaku from 1795-1814.

== Family ==
He had a son, Masamichi, with the daughter of the 11th head of Tokushima Domain, Hachisuka Shigeyoshi.
