= Tokugawa Ienari =

Japanese Samurai, Daimyo and Military ruler of Japan from 1787 to 1837

Senior First Rank Tokugawa Ienari
- 徳川 家斉
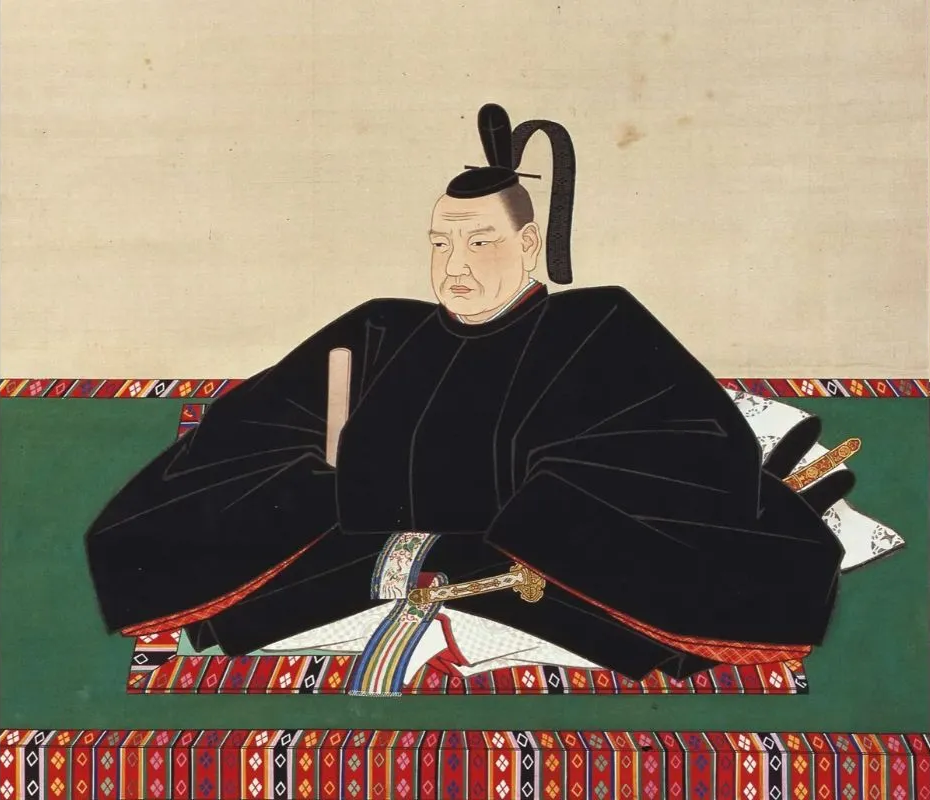

Shōgun
- In office 23 April 1787 – 6 May 1837
- Monarchs: Kōkaku; Ninkō
- Preceded by: Tokugawa Ieharu
- Succeeded by: Tokugawa Ieyoshi

Personal details
- Born: 18 November 1773 Edo, Tokugawa shogunate (now Tokyo, Japan)
- Died: 22 March 1841 (aged 67) Tokugawa shogunate
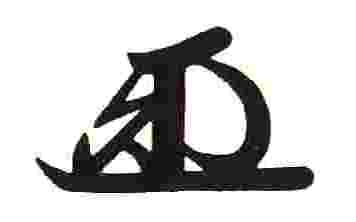
- Signature

Tokugawa Ienari (徳川 家斉; 18 November 1773 – 22 March 1841) was a Japanese samurai, daimyo and the eleventh and longest-serving shōgun of the Tokugawa shogunate of Japan who held office from 1787 to 1837. He was a great-grandson of the eighth shōgun Tokugawa Yoshimune through his son Munetada (1721–1764), head of the Hitotsubashi branch of the family, and his grandson Harusada (1751–1827).

Ienari died in 1841 and was given the Buddhist name Bunkyouin and buried at Kan'ei-ji.

== Events of Ienari's bakufu ==
- 1787 (Tenmei 7): Ienari becomes the 11th shōgun of the bakufu government.
- 1788 (Tenmei 7): Riots in rice shops in Edo and Osaka.
- 6 – 11 March 1788 (Tenmei 8, 29th day of the 1st month – 4th day of the second month): Great Fire of Kyoto. A fire in the city, which begins at 3 o'clock in the morning of March 6 burns uncontrolled until the 1st day of the second month (March 8); and embers smolder until extinguished by heavy rain on the 4th day of the second month (March 11). The emperor and his court flee the fire, and the Imperial Palace is destroyed. No other re-construction is permitted until a new palace is completed. This fire was considered a major event. The Dutch VOC Opperhoofd in Dejima noted in his official record book that "people are considering it to be a great and extraordinary heavenly portent."
- 28 February 1793 (Kansei 5, on the 18th day of the 1st month): Collapse of the peak of Mount Unzen.
- 17 March 1793 (Kansei 5, on the 6th day of the 2nd month): Eruption of Mt. Biwas-no-kubi
- 15 April 1793 (Kansei 5, on the 1st day of the 3rd month): The Shimabara earthquake.
- 10 May 1793 (Kansei 5, on the 1st day of the 4th month): Eruption of Mt. Miyama.
- September 1817, the Shōgun orders the expulsion of Titia Bergsma, the first European woman to visit Japan
- 1833–1837, the Tenpō famine
- 1837 (Tenpō 7): Tokugawa Ieyoshi becomes the 12th shōgun of the bakufu government.

== Family life ==
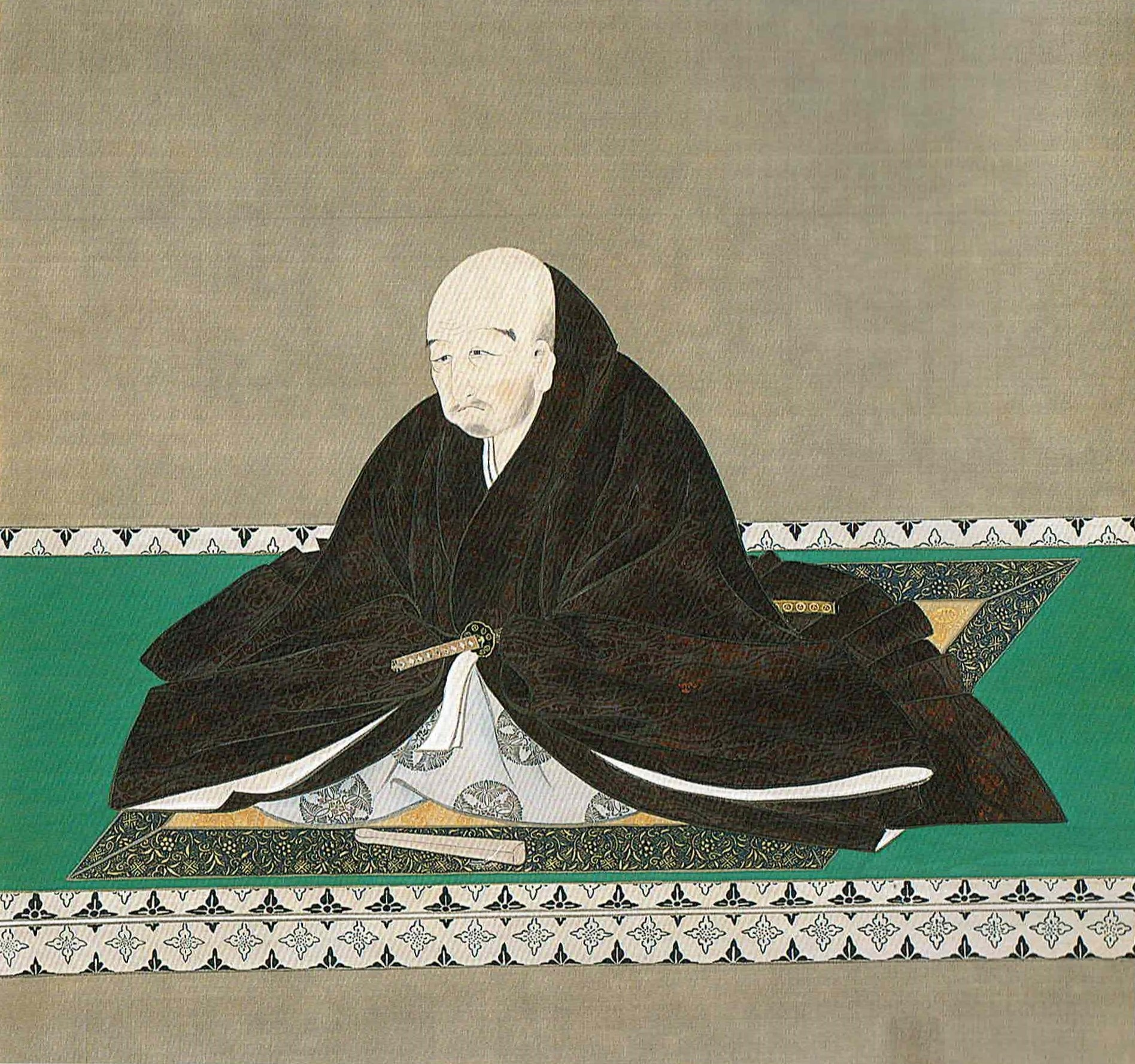
Tokugawa Harusada, Ienari's father

=== First wife ===
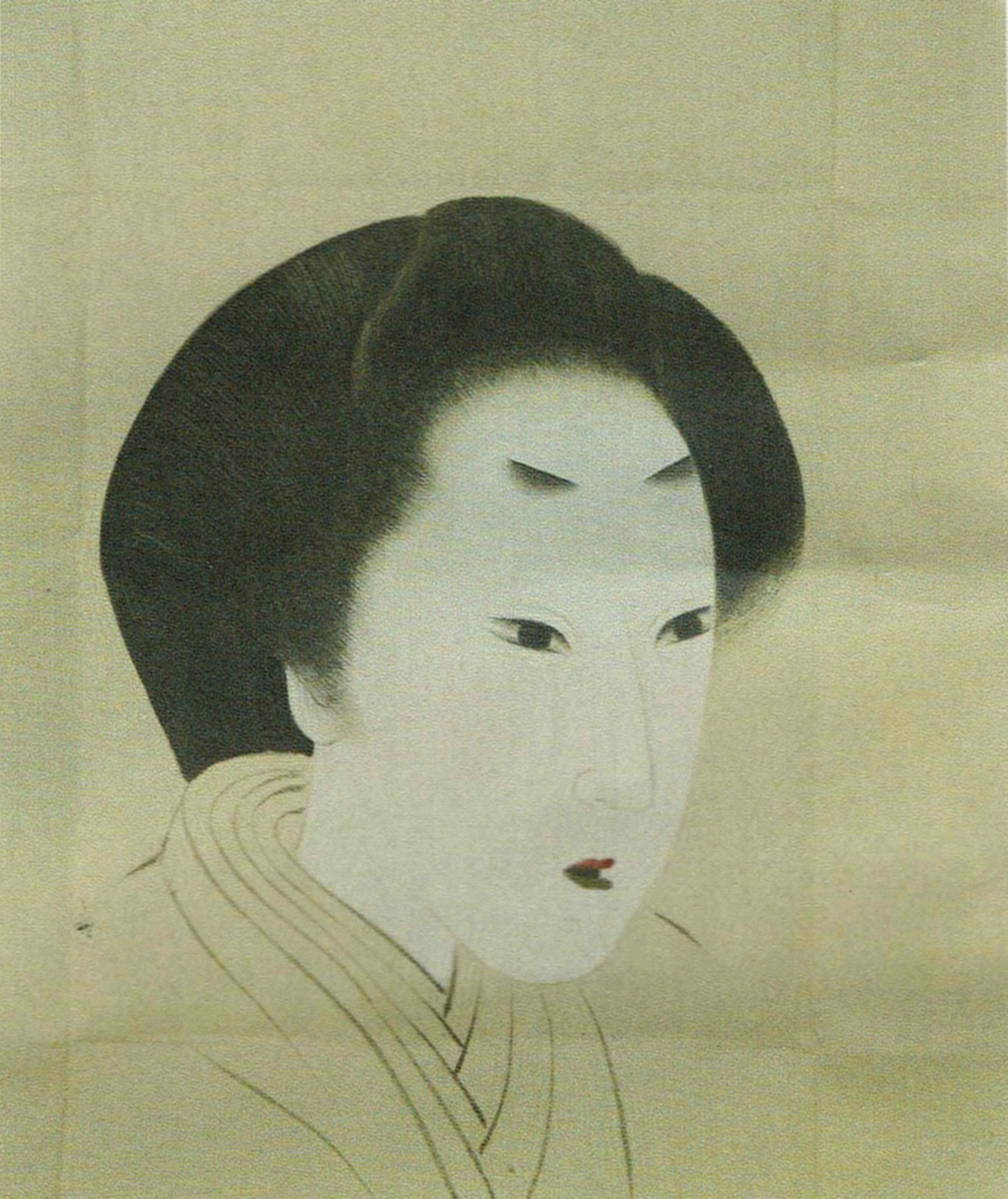
Ienari's wife, Shigehime, later Kodaiin

In 1778, the four-year-old Hitotsubashi Toyochiyo (豊千代), a minor figure in the Tokugawa clan hierarchy, was betrothed to Shimazu Shigehime or Tadakohime, the four-year-old daughter of Shimazu Shigehide, the tozama daimyō of Satsuma Domain on the island of Kyūshū. The significance of this alliance was dramatically enhanced when, in 1781, the young Toyochiyo was adopted by the childless shōgun, Tokugawa Ieharu. This meant that when Toyochiyo became Shōgun Ienari in 1786, Shigehide was set to become the father-in-law of the shōgun. The marriage was completed in 1789, after which Tadako became formally known as Midaidokoro Sadako, or "first wife" Sadako. Protocol required that she be adopted into a court family, and the Konoe family agreed to take her in but this was a mere formality.

=== Other relationships ===
Ienari kept a harem of 900 women and fathered over 75 children.

Many of Ienari's children were adopted into various daimyō houses throughout Japan, and some played important roles in the history of the Bakumatsu and Boshin War. Some of the more famous among them included:

- Hachisuka Narihiro, Tokushima Domain
  - Hachisuka Mochiaki
    - Hachisuka Masaaki (1871–1932)
      - Hachisuka Masauji (1903–1953)
        - Hachisuka Masako (1941)
      - Hachisuka Toshiko (1896–1970)
- Matsudaira Naritami, Tsuyama Domain
- Tokugawa Narikatsu (1820–1849), Shimizu Tokugawa family then to Wakayama Domain
- Matsudaira Narisawa, Fukui Domain
- Tokugawa Nariyuki (1801–1846), Wakayama Domain
  - Tokugawa Iemochi
- Tazawa Hidenari, Tazawa Domain, as Tazawa Hideyasu's adopted son

=== Parents and siblings ===
- Father: Tokugawa Harusada (1751–1827)
- Mother: O-Tomi no Kata (d. 1817)
- Adoptive Father: Tokugawa Ieharu
- Siblings:
  - Kiihime married Hosokawa Naritatsu of Kumamoto Domain
  - Matsudaira Yoshisue (1785–1804) of Takasu Domain
  - Kuroda Naritaka (1777–1795) of Fukuoka Domain
  - Tokugawa Harukuni (1776–1793)
  - Tokugawa Nariatsu
  - Hisanosuke
  - Honnosuke
  - Tokugawa Narimasa
  - Yunosuke

=== Wife and concubines ===
- Wife: Shimazu Shigehime, later Kodaiin (1773–1844), daughter of Shimazu Shigehide of Satsuma Domain
- Concubine:
  - Omiyo no Kata (1797–1872) (There is legend said that Omiyo was daughter of Tokugawa Ieharu with a servant) later Senkoin
  - O-ito no kata
  - Oyae no Kata (d. 1843) later Kaishun'in
  - Oraku no Kata (d. 1810) later Korin'in
  - Otase no Kata (d. 1832) later Myosoin
  - Ohana no Kata (d. 1845) later Seiren'in
  - Ohachi no Kata later Honrin'in (d. 1850)
  - Ohachi no Kata (d. 1813) later Chisoin
  - Osode no Kata (d. 1830) later Honshoin
  - Oyachi no Kata (d. 1810) later Seishoin
  - Osato no Kata (d. 1800) later Chosoin
  - Ocho no Kata (d. 1852) later Sokuseiin
  - Oshiga no Kata (d. 1813) later Keimeiin
  - Outa no Kata (d. 1851) later Hoschiin
  - Oume no Kata (d. 1794)later Shinsei-in
  - Oman no Kata (d. 1835) later Seishin'in
  - Obi no Kata (d. 1808) later Hoshin'in

=== Children ===
- Toshihime (1789–1817) married Tokugawa Naritomo by Oman
- Koso-in (b. 1790) by Oman
- Takechiyo (1792–1793) by Oman
- Tokugawa Ieyoshi (1793–1837) by Korin'in
- Hidehime (b. 1794) later Tansei-in by Oume
- Ayahime (1795–1797; infant when died and replaced by her younger sister, Asahime) Married Date Chikamune of Sendai Domain by Oman
- Tokugawa Keinosuke (1795–1797) by Outa
- Tokugawa Atsunosuke (1796–1799) born by Shigehime inherited Shimazu-Tokugawa family
- Sohime (1796–1797) by Oshiga
- Tokugawa Toyasaburo (b. 1798) by Outa
- Kakuhime (1798–1799) by Osato
- Gohyakuhime (1799–1800) by Outa
- Tazawa Hidenari
- Tokugawa Hidemaru
- Mine-hime (1800–1853) born by Otase and married Tokugawa Narinobu of Owari Domain
- Tokugawa Nariyuki (1801–1846) inherited Shimizu-Tokugawa family later inherited Kii Domain and born to Otase
- Toruhime (1801–1802) by Ocho
- Jiyohime (1802–1803) by Oume
- Asahime (1803–1843) married Date Chikamune later married Matsudaira Naritsugu of Fukui Domain by Obi
- Jukihime (1803–1804) by Otase
- Tokugawa Tokinosuke (1803–1805) by Ocho
- Harehime (1805–1807) by Otase
- Tokugawa Torachiyo (1806–1810) by Ocho
- Kohime (b. 1806)
- Kishihime (1807–1811)
- Motohime (1808–1821) married Matsudaira Katahiro of Aizu Domain by Oyachi
- Ayahime (1809–1837) married Matsudaira Yoritane of Takamatsu Domain by Osode
- Tokugawa Tomomatsu (1809–1813) by Ocho
- Yohime (1813–1868), married Maeda Nariyasu, born to Omiyo
- Nakahime (1815–1817), born to Omiyo
- Tokugawa Narinori (1810–1827) inherited Shimizu family of Gosankyō and born by Oyae
- Tokugawa Naritaka born by Ocho
- Tsuyahime (b.1811) by Osode
- Morihime (1811–1846) married Nabeshima Naomasa of Saga Domain by Oyae
- Ikeda Narihiro (1812–1826) born by Oyae
- Kazuhime (1813–1830) married Mori Narito of Chōshū Domain by Ocho
- Takahime (1813–1814) by Osode
- Tokugawa Okugoro (1813–1814) by Ohachi
- Kotohime (1815–1816) by Ohana
- Tokugawa Kyugoro (1815–1817) by Ocho
- Matsudaira Naritami born to Oyae
- Suehime (1817–1872) married Asano Naritaka of Hiroshima Domain later Yousein by Omiyo
- Kiyohime (1818–1868), married Sakai Tadanori of Himeji Domain later Seiko-in, born to Oyae
- Matsudaira Nariyoshi (1820–1838) adopted to Fukui-Matsudaira family by Ohana
- Tokugawa Shichiro (1818–1821) by Osode
- Matsudaira Nariyoshi (1819–1839) of Hamada Domain and born to Oyae
- Ei-hime (1819–1875) married Tokugawa Narikura of Hitotsubashi-Tokugawa Family by Ohana
- Tokugawa Nariharu born by Ohana
- Matsudaira Narisawa born by Honrin'in
- Tokugawa Narikatsu (1820–1850) inherited Shimizu-Tokugawa family later inherited Kii Domain and born by Osode
- Hachisuka Narihiro born by Oyae
- Tokugawa Hachiro (1822–1823) by Osode
- Matsudaira Narisada (1823–1841) born by Ohana
- Matsudaira Narikoto (1825–1844) of Akashi Domain born by Ohana
- Taehime (1827–1843) by Ohana and married Ikeda Narimichi of Tottori Domain
- Tokugawa Taminosuke, born by O-ito
- Fumihime

== Notable descendants ==
Tokugawa Nariyuki (1801–1846)

- Kikuhime
- Yohime
- Tokugawa Iemochi

Asahime (1803–1843) married Matsudaira Naritsugu

- Kikuhime (1829–1829)
- Yoshimaru (1835–1835)
- Kuninosuke

Tokugawa Naritaka

- Shomaru (1846–1847) inherited Hitotsubashi-Tokugawa family
- Rihime married Asano Yoshiteru
- Fuhime married Matsudaira Noritoshi

Yo-hime (1813–1868) married Maeda Nariyasu

- Ikeda Yoshitaka (1834–1850)
- Kanoshimaru
- Maeda Yoshiyasu
  - Maeda Toshitsugu (1858–1900)
    - Namiko married Toshinari Maeda
      - Maeda Toshitatsu (1908–1989)
        - Maeda Toshiyasu (b. 1935)
          - Maeda Toshinori (b. 1963)

Matsudaira Naritami

- Matsudaira Yasutomo
- Hitoshimaru
- daughter married Miura Yoshitsugu
- Matsudaira Yasutami (1861–1921)
  - Matsudaira Yasuyoshi
  - Matsudaira Yasuharu
  - Takako married Ichishima Noriatsu
  - Teruko married Shuta Yasuto
  - Watanabe Akira
  - Tsuruko married Matsudaira Yoritsune
  - Sansuko married Isahaya Fujio
  - Matsudaira Shiro
  - Matsudaira Fumihiro

Suehime

- Yakuhime (1843–1843)

Kiyo-hime

- Tokudairo (1835–1837)
- Kisohime (b. 1834) married Sakai Tadatomi

Tokugawa Narikatsu (1820–1850)

- Ryuchiyo
- Tatsujiro
- Nobehime
- Akihime
- Junhime
- Kikuhime

Hachisuka Narihiro

- Kayohime (1848–1865) married Matsudaira Mochiaki
- Hachisuka Mochiaki
  - Hachisuka Masaaki (1871–1932)
    - Hachisuka Tsuruko
    - Hachisuka Yoshiko
    - Hachisuka Saeko married Satake Yoshitane
    - Hachisuka Fueko married Masayuki Matsuda
      - Asako married Prince Kaya-no-Miya Harunori
    - Hachisuka Toshiko (1896–1970) married Matsudaira Yasuharu
      - 1 son and 4 daughters
    - Masauji Hachisuka (1903–1953)
      - Masako Hachisuka (b. 1941)

Tokugawa Ieyoshi

- Takechiyo (1813–1814)
- Tatsuhime (1814–1818)
- Tomohime (1815–1815)
- Saigen-in (1816–1816)
- Yochiyo (1819–1820)
- Entsuin (1822-1822)
- Tokugawa Iesada
- Maihime (1824–1829)
- Tokugawa Yoshimasa (1825–1838) of Hitotsubashi-Tokugawa Family
- Teruhime (1826–1840) married Tokugawa Yoshiyori and later known as Teimei-in
- Hanhime (1826–1826) by Okaju
- Tokugawa Harunojo (1826–1827)
- Tokugawa Atsugoro (1828–1829)
- Tokugawa Jikimaru (1829–1830)
- Tokugawa Ginnojo (1832–1833)
- Satohime (1833–1834)
- Chiehime (1835–1836)
- Yoshihime (1836–1837)
- Tokugawa Kamegoro (1838–1839)
- Maijihime (1839–1840)
- Wakahime (1842–1843)
- Shoyo-in (1843–1843)
- Okuhime (1844–1845)
- Tokugawa Tadashimaru (1845–1846)
- Shikihime (1848–1848)
- Sashin-in (1849–1849)
- Tokugawa Choyoshiro (1852–1853)

== Eras of Ienari's bakufu ==
The years in which Ienari was shōgun are more specifically identified by more than one era name or nengō.

- Tenmei (1781–1789)
- Kansei (1789–1801)
- Kyōwa (1801–1804)
- Bunka (1804–1818)
- Bunsei (1818–1830)
- Tenpō (1830–1844)

== Ancestry ==
Ancestors of Tokugawa Ienari

8.Tokugawa Yoshimune, 8th Tokugawa Shōgun (1684-1751)
4. Tokugawa Munetada, 1st Hitotsubashi-Tokugawa family head (1721-1765)
9.Shinshin'in (1700-1721)
2. Tokugawa Harusada, 2nd Hitotsubashi-Tokugawa family head (1751-1827)
5. Hosoda (Oyuka no Kata)
1. Tokugawa Ienari, 11th Tokugawa Shōgun
6. Iwamoto Masatoshi
3. Otomi no Kata (d. 1817)

== See also ==
- Matsudaira Sadanobu

== Notes ==
Military offices
Preceded by Tokugawa Ieharu	Shōgun: Tokugawa Ienari; 1786–1837	Succeeded by Tokugawa Ieyoshi
