= Masako Hachisuka =

Japanese linguist

- 蜂須賀 正子
- Born: January 7, 1941 (age 85)
- Occupation: Linguist

Masako Hachisuka (蜂須賀 正子, Hachisuka Masako; born 7 January 1941) is a Japanese linguist specialising in the English language and the head of the Hachisuka clan since 1953.

== Biography ==
Masako's father was Masauji Hachisuka and her mother was Chiye Nagamine. Her paternal grandparents were Masaaki Hachisuka and Fudeko Tokugawa. She is the great-granddaughter of Tokugawa Yoshinobu. Her aunt was Toshiko Hachisuka.

Hachisuka studied in the United States from 24 August 1950 to 1 October 1954. She was engaged to William Patterson, but her mother dissolved that marriage by filing a lawsuit claiming that she was of noble ancestry. Since she has no children, including adopted children, she is the last head of the Hachisuka clan.

In 2004, Hachisuka donated historical materials related to her clan to Tokushima. The donated materials were exhibited at the Tokushima Castle Museum.
