= Hachisuka Mitsutaka =

Japanese daimyō

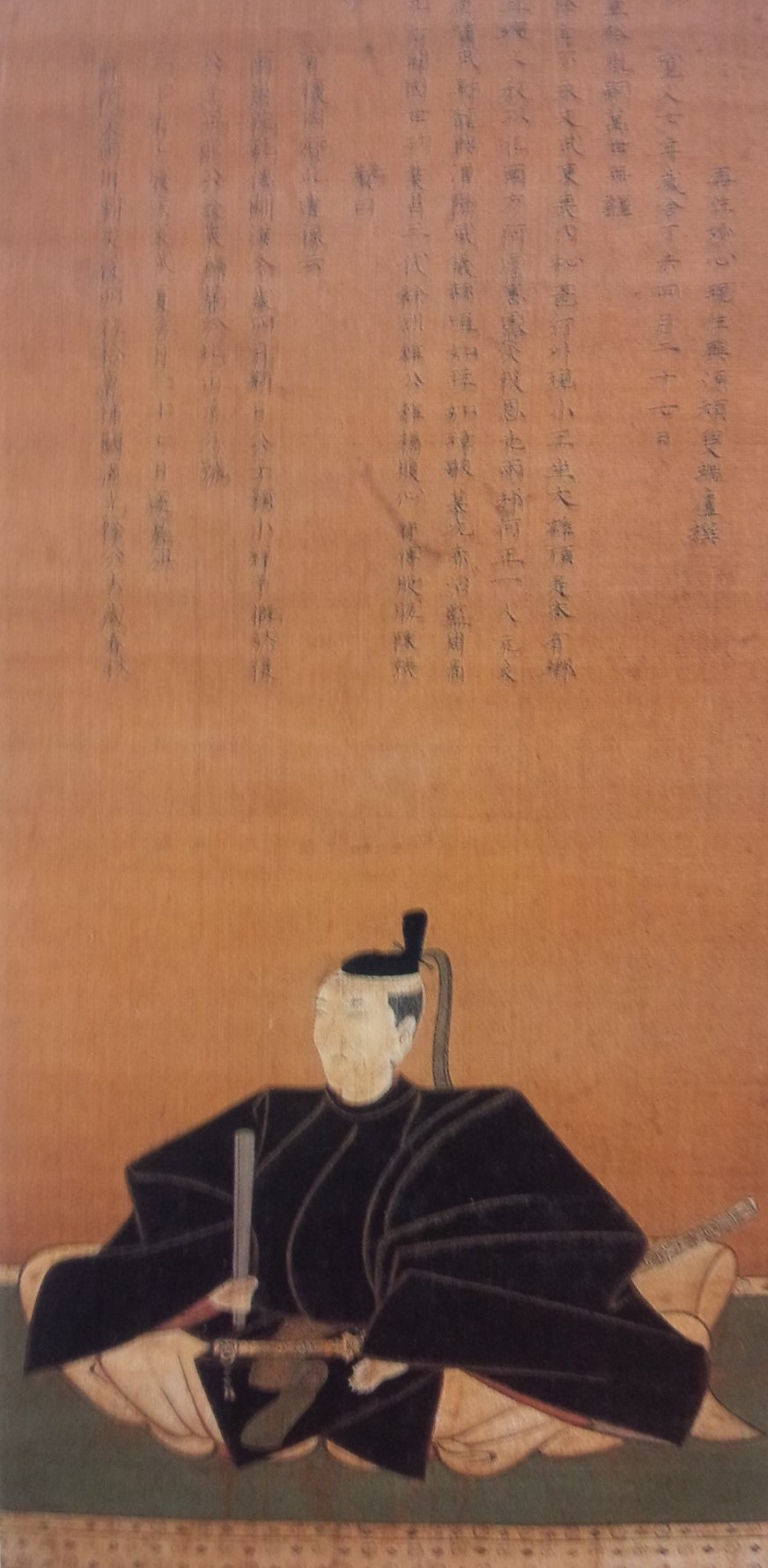

Hachisuka Mitsutaka (蜂須賀 光隆) (November 17, 1630 – June 29, 1666) was a Japanese daimyō of the Edo period, who ruled the Tokushima Domain. His court title was Awa no kami. He was a Junior 4th Rank, Chamberlain.

== Family ==
- Father: Hachisuka Tadateru
- Mother: Reishoin (d.1655)
- Wife: Kinhime (d.1703)
- Concubine: Inai no Kata
- Children:
  - Hachisuka Tsunamichi by Kinhime
  - Yukihime married Niwa Nagatsugu by Inai no Kata

Preceded by Hachisuka Tadateru	3rd (Hachisuka) Lord of Tokushima; 1652–1666	Succeeded by Hachisuka Tsunamichi
