= Hachisuka Munekazu =

Japanese daimyō

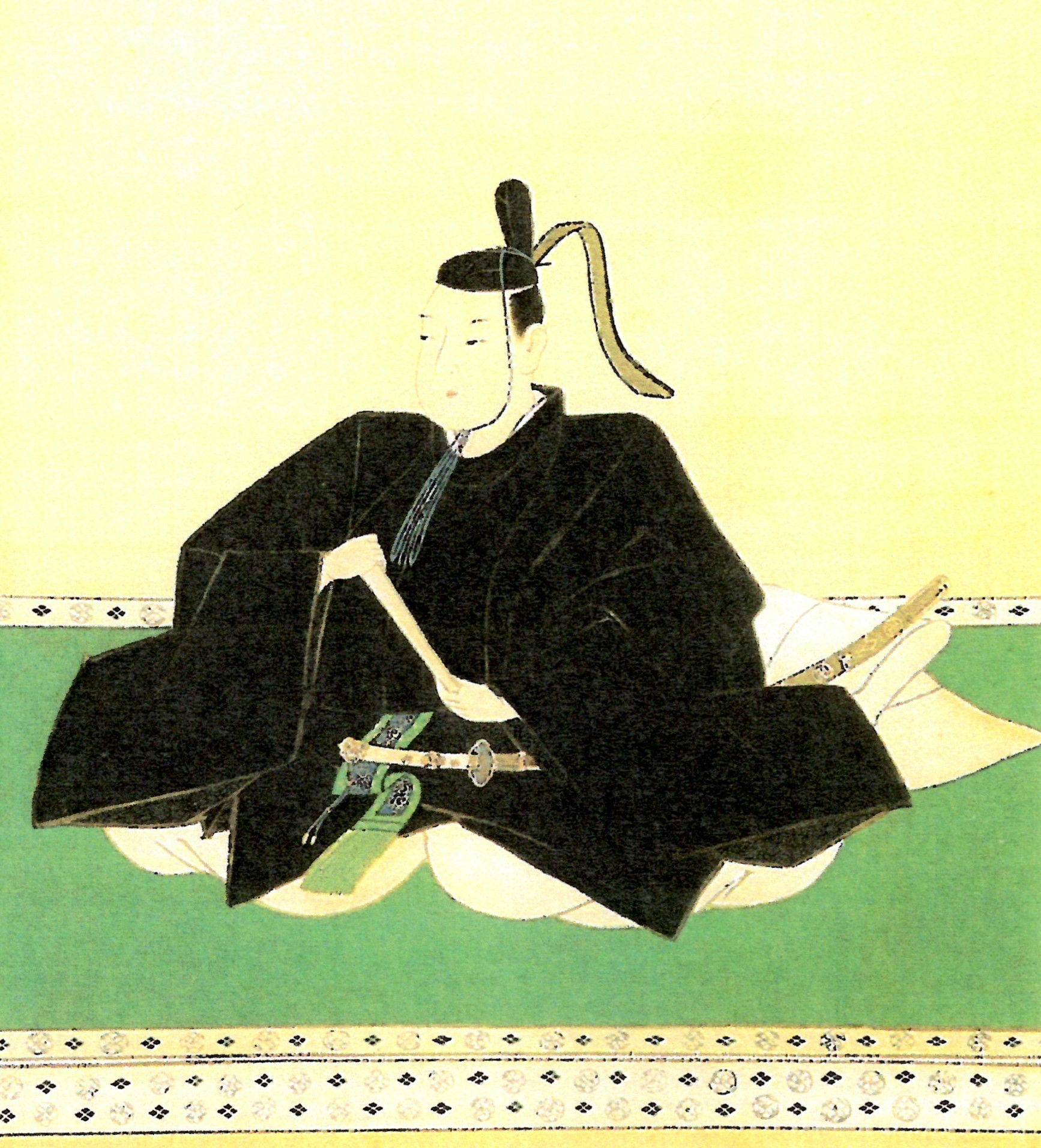

Hachisuka Munekazu (蜂須賀 宗員) (September 10, 1709 – July 26, 1735) was a Japanese daimyō of the Edo period, who ruled the Tokushima Domain. His court title was Awa no kami.

== Family ==
- Father: Hachisuka Tsunanori
- Mother: Kahime
- Concubines:
  - Okada-dono
  - Unknown
- Children:
  - Hachisuka Shigenori (1729-1751) by Okada-dono
  - Tsunechiyo by Unknown
  - daughter betrothed to Ii Naoyoshi by Unknown

Preceded by Hachisuka Takanaga	3rd (Hachisuka) Lord of Tomida; 1714–1725	Succeeded by none
Preceded by Hachisuka Tsunanori	6th (Hachisuka) Lord of Tokushima; 1728–1735	Succeeded by Hachisuka Muneteru
