= Hachisuka Haruaki =

Japanese daimyo

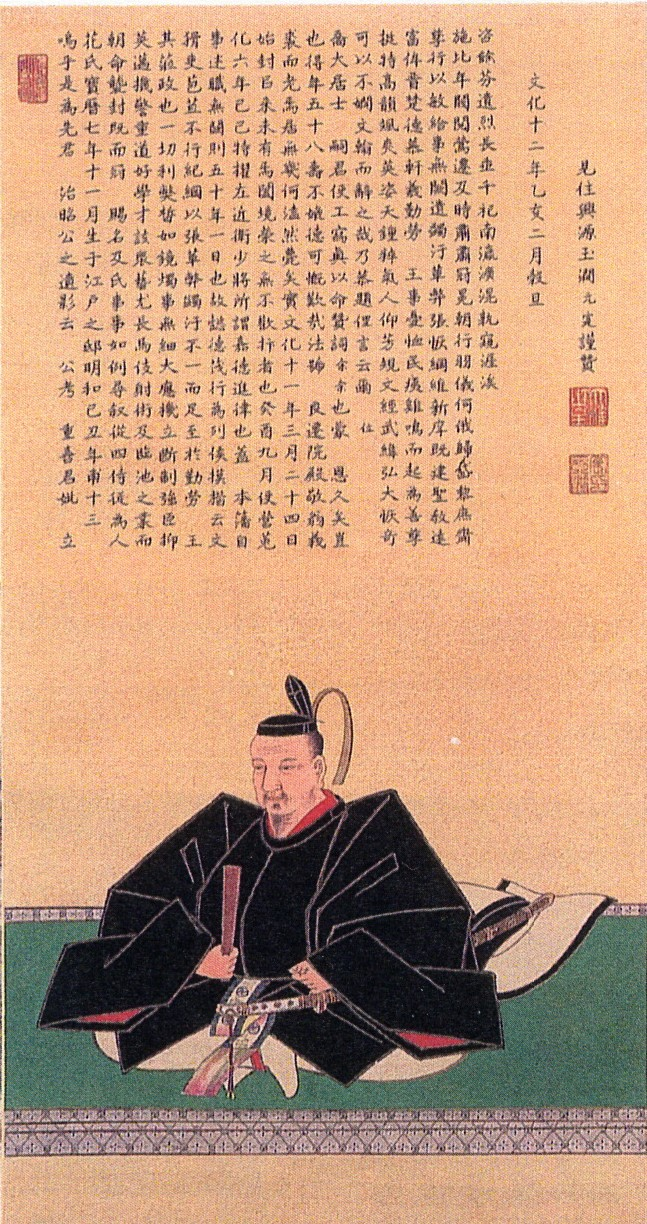

Hachisuka Haruaki (蜂須賀 治昭) (January 3, 1758 – May 13, 1814) was a Japanese daimyō of the Edo period, who ruled the Tokushima Domain.

== Family ==
- Father: Hachisuka Shigeyoshi
- Mother: Tsutehime
- Wife: Toshihime (1762-1786)
- Concubines:
  - Takano-dono
  - Tsuyo no Kata
- Children:
  - Hachisuka Akimaru
  - Norihime married Okubo Tadazane by Takano-dono
  - Norijiro by Takano-dono
  - Tsunahime married Matsudaira Sadanaga by Tsuyo no Kata
  - Hachisuka Narimasa by Tsuyo no Kata
  - Hachisuka Akiyuki by Tsuyo no Kata
  - Mitsuhime married Matsudaira Mitsuosa by Tsuyo no Kata
  - Yoshihime married Kuki Takanori by Tsuyo no Kata

== Ancestry ==
Ancestors of Hachisuka Haruaki

16. Satake Yoshihide (1645-1721)
8. Satake Yoshimoto (1675-1752)
17. Yoshikawa
4. Satake Yoshimichi, 2nd Lord of Kubota-Shinden (1701-1765)
18. Koga Michijo (1647-1723)
9. Hirohata
19. Saionji
2. Hachisuka Shigeyoshi, 10th Lord of Tokushima (1738-1801)
20. Naitō Masachika, 2nd Lord of Izumi (1645-1696)
10. Naitō Masamori, 1st Lord of Annaka (1683-1738)
21. Abe
5. Naitō
22. Soshi Sadaaki
11. Soshi
1. Hachisuka Haruaki, 11th Lord of Tokushima
24. Tachibana Shigetora (1644-1701)
12. Tachibana Shigetaka
25. Seikō-in
6. Tachibana Sadayoshi, 5th Lord of Yanagawa (1698-1744)
26. Tachibana Tanenaga, 2nd Lord of Miike (1625-1711)
13. Tachibana Yuzumiin
27. Koide Kōgakuin
3. Tachibana Tsutehime
7. Nagaya Mine

Preceded by Hachisuka Shigeyoshi	11th (Hachisuka) Lord of Tokushima; 1769–1813	Succeeded by Hachisuka Narimasa
