= Takatsukasa Masamichi =

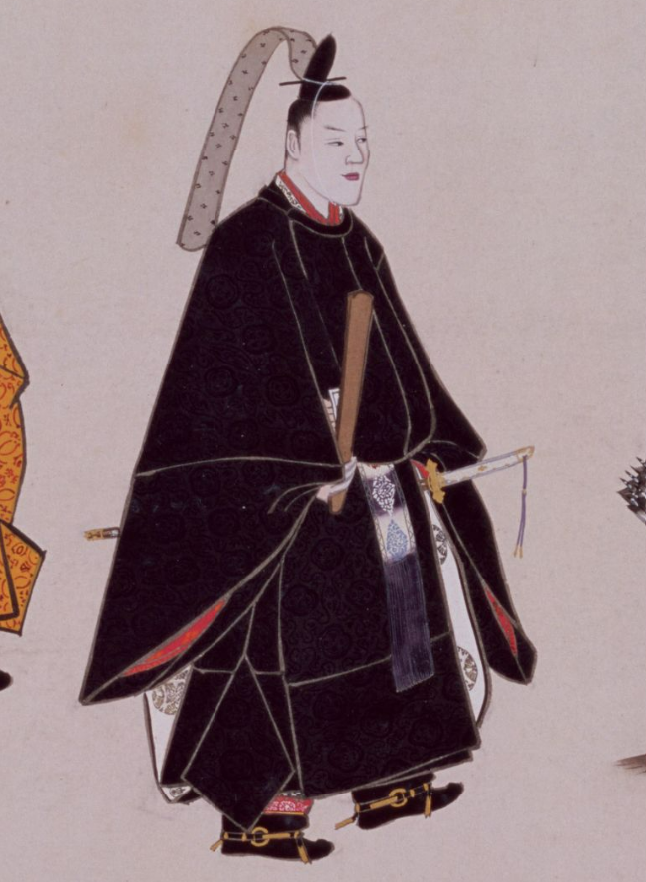

Takatsukasa Masamichi (鷹司 政通; 22 August 1789 – 29 November 1868) was a Japanese court noble of the late Edo period. He held the regent position of kampaku from 1823–1856.

== Biography ==
Masamichi was born the son of regent Takatsukasa Masahiro.

He served as kampaku from 1823–1856. In 1856, at the Ansei Purge, he was prosecuted and later became a priest.

== Family ==
He had a son, Sukehiro, with the daughter of the seventh head of Mito Domain Tokugawa Harutoshi. One of his daughters married the 13th head of Tokushima Domain Hachisuka Narihiro.
