= Hachisuka Tsunanori =

Japanese daimyō

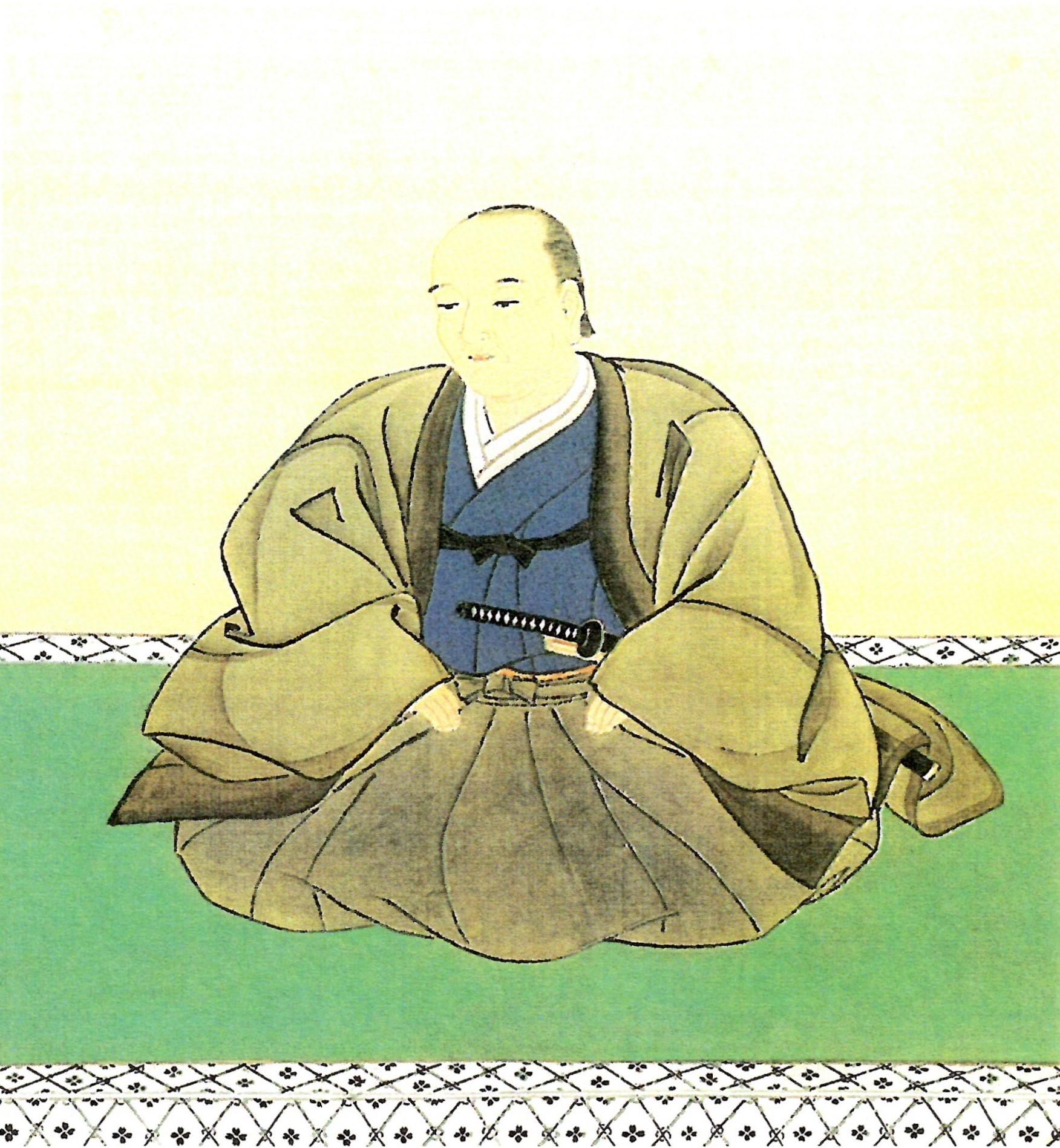

Hachisuka Tsunanori (蜂須賀 綱矩) (June 24, 1661 – December 16, 1730) was a Japanese daimyō of the Edo period, who ruled the Tokushima Domain. His court title was Awaji no kami.

== Family ==
- Father: Hachisuka Takanori (1642-1695)
- Mother: Oshichi no Kata
- Wives:
  - Enhime
  - Kahime
- Concubines:
  - Yokoyama-dono
  - Fukura-dono
  - Commoner
- Children:
  - Hachisuka Yoshitake (1692-1725) by Enhime
  - Hachisuka Munekazu by Kahime
  - Kotaro by Yokoyama-dono
  - Hachisuka Takahiro (1694-1756) by Yokoyama-dono
  - Ishimaru by Yokoyama-dono
  - daughter by Fukura-dono
  - Donosuke by Commoner
  - Renkoin married Ii Naonobu by Commoner
  - Hachigoro by Commoner
  - Gengo by Commoner
  - daughter married Ogasawara Tadasada by Commoner
  - daughter married Okubo Tadaoki by Commoner
  - daughter married Ando Nobutada by Commoner

Preceded by Hachisuka Tsunamichi	5th (Hachisuka) Lord of Tokushima; 1678–1728	Succeeded by Hachisuka Munekazu
