= Hachisuka Tsunamichi =

Japanese daimyō

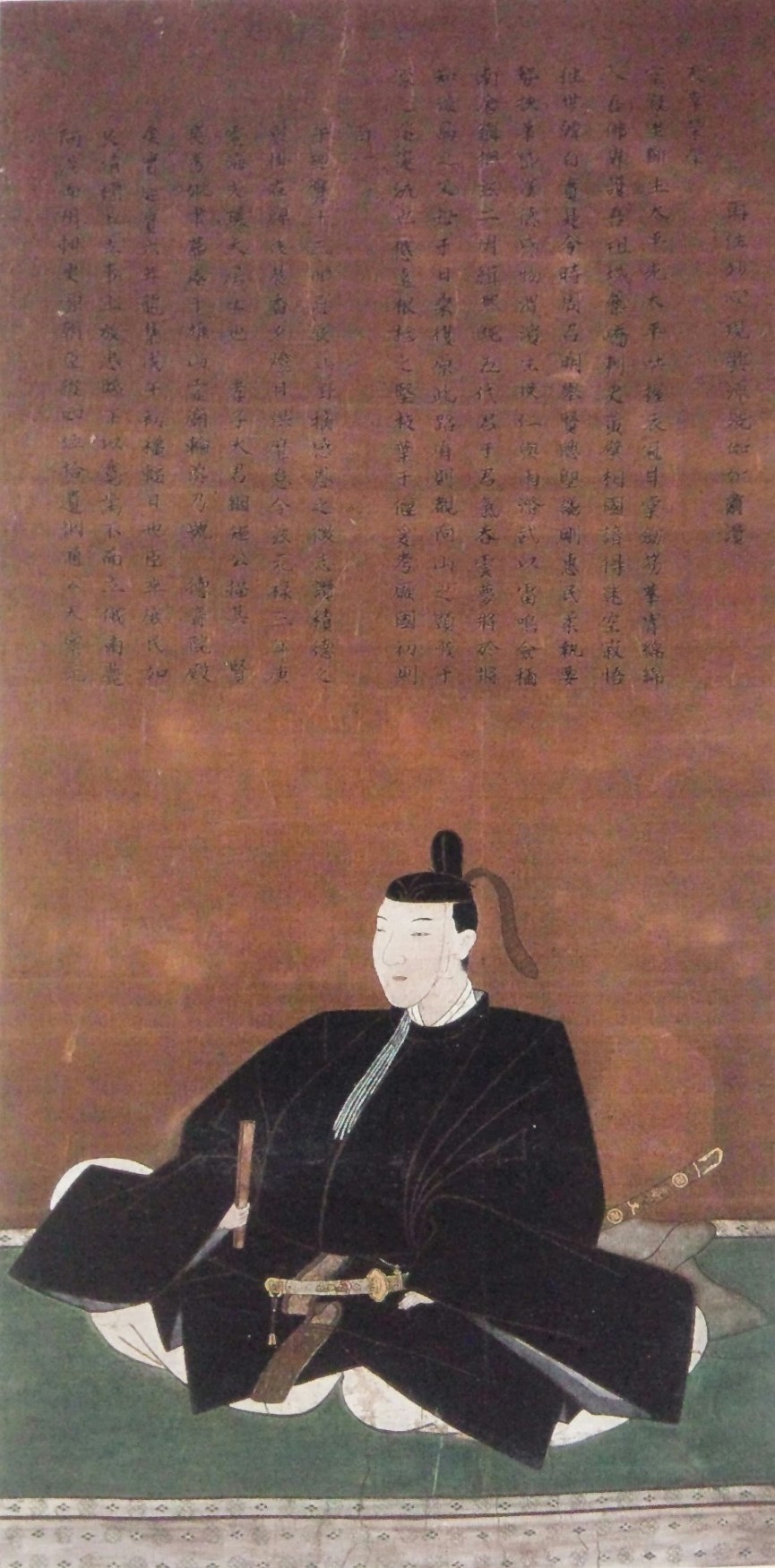

Hachisuka Tsunamichi (蜂須賀 綱通) (March 13, 1656 – September 15, 1678) was a Japanese daimyō of the Edo period, who ruled the Tokushima Domain. His court title was Awa no kami. He formally converted to Buddhism.

== Family ==
- Father: Hachisuka Mitsutaka
- Mother: Kinhime (d.1703)
- Wife: Reishoin

Preceded by Hachisuka Mitsutaka	4th (Hachisuka) Lord of Tokushima; 1666–1678	Succeeded by Hachisuka Tsunanori
