= Hachisuka Tadateru =

Japanese daimyō

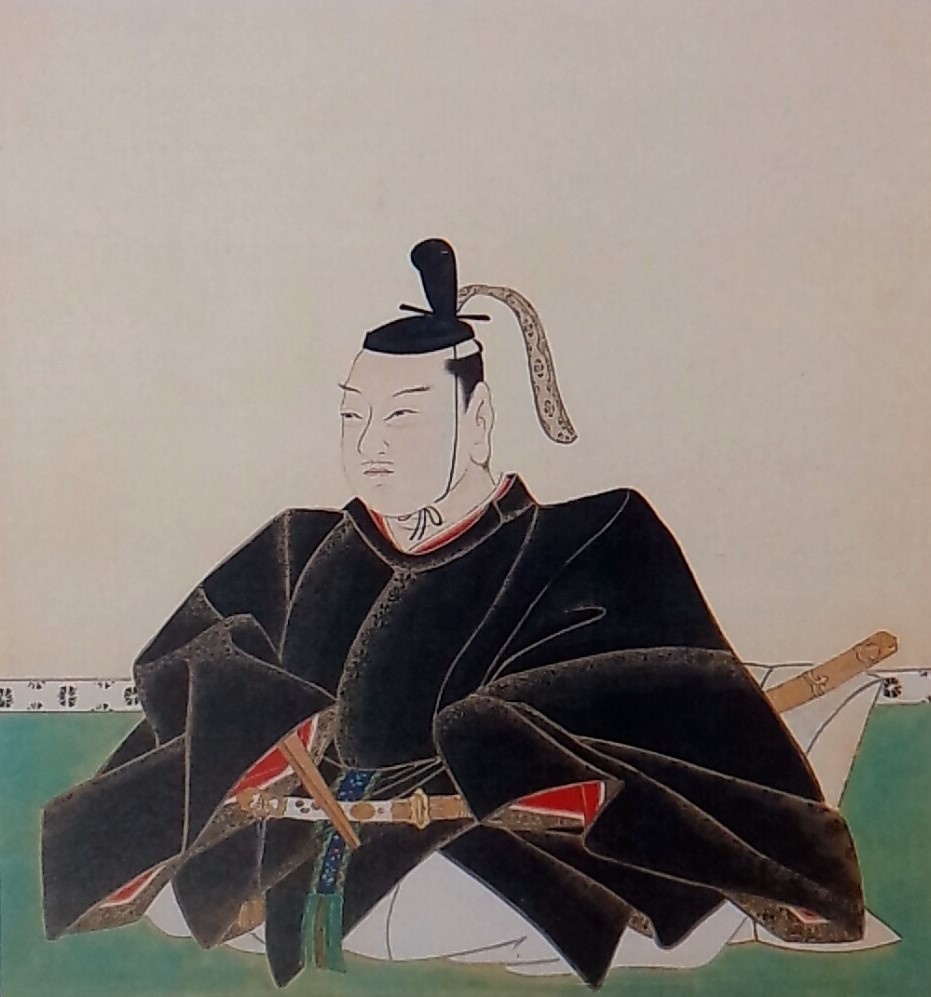

Hachisuka Tadateru (蜂須賀 忠英) (April 1611 – May 11, 1652) was a Japanese daimyō of the Edo period, who ruled the Tokushima Domain.

He was the eldest son of Hachisuka Yoshishige.

Tadateru's court title was Awa no kami.

== Family ==
- Father: Hachisuka Yoshishige
- Mother: Manhime (1592–1666)
- Wife: Reishoin (d.1655)
- Concubines:
  - unknown maybe Commoner
  - daughter of Takada Masaharu
- Children:
  - Hachisuka Mitsutaka by Reishoin
  - Hachisuka Takashige (1634-1707) by Reishoin
  - Hachisuka Takanori (1642-1695) by daughter of Takada Masaharu
  - Ishimatsu by unknown maybe Commoner
  - Kiyohime married Inada Tanehide by unknown maybe Commoner
  - Hachisuka Takayoshi (1643-1698) by unknown maybe Commoner

Preceded by Hachisuka Yoshishige	2nd (Hachisuka) Lord of Tokushima; 1620–1652	Succeeded by Hachisuka Mitsutaka
