= Hachisuka Muneshige =

Japanese daimyō

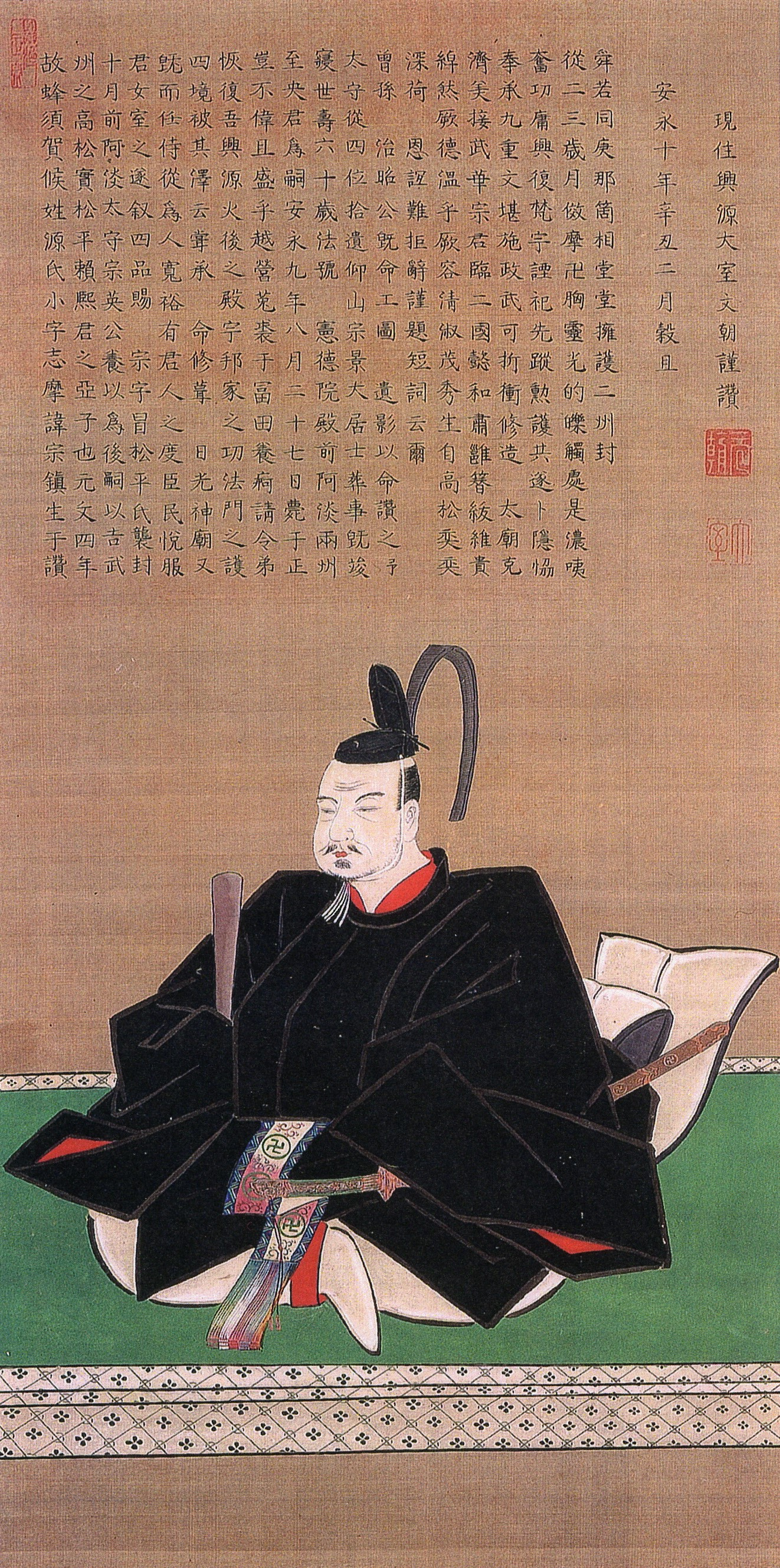

Hachisuka Muneshige (蜂須賀 宗鎮) (September 28, 1721 – September 25, 1780) was a Japanese daimyō of the Edo period, who ruled the Tokushima Domain. His court title was Awa no kami.

== Family ==
- Father: Matsudaira Yorihiro (1700-1737)
- Mother: Sano-dono
- Wife: Adopted daughter of Ogasawara Hidemasa, who was the granddaughter of Tokugawa Ieyasu
- Concubines:
  - Kume-dono
  - Kose-dono
  - Unknown
- Children:
  - Daughter by wife
  - Ishimatsu by Kume-dono
  - Yoshiko married Sanjo Saneoki by Kose-dono
  - Yonosuke by Kose-dono
  - daughter by Kose-dono
  - Hachisuka Yoshimitsu (1769-1812)
  - Daughter by Unknown
  - Daughter by Unknown
  - Daughter by Unknown
  - Kamechiyo by Unknown

Preceded by Hachisuka Muneteru	8th (Hachisuka) Lord of Tokushima; 1739–1754	Succeeded by Hachisuka Yoshihiro
