= Hachisuka Yoshishige =

Japanese daimyō

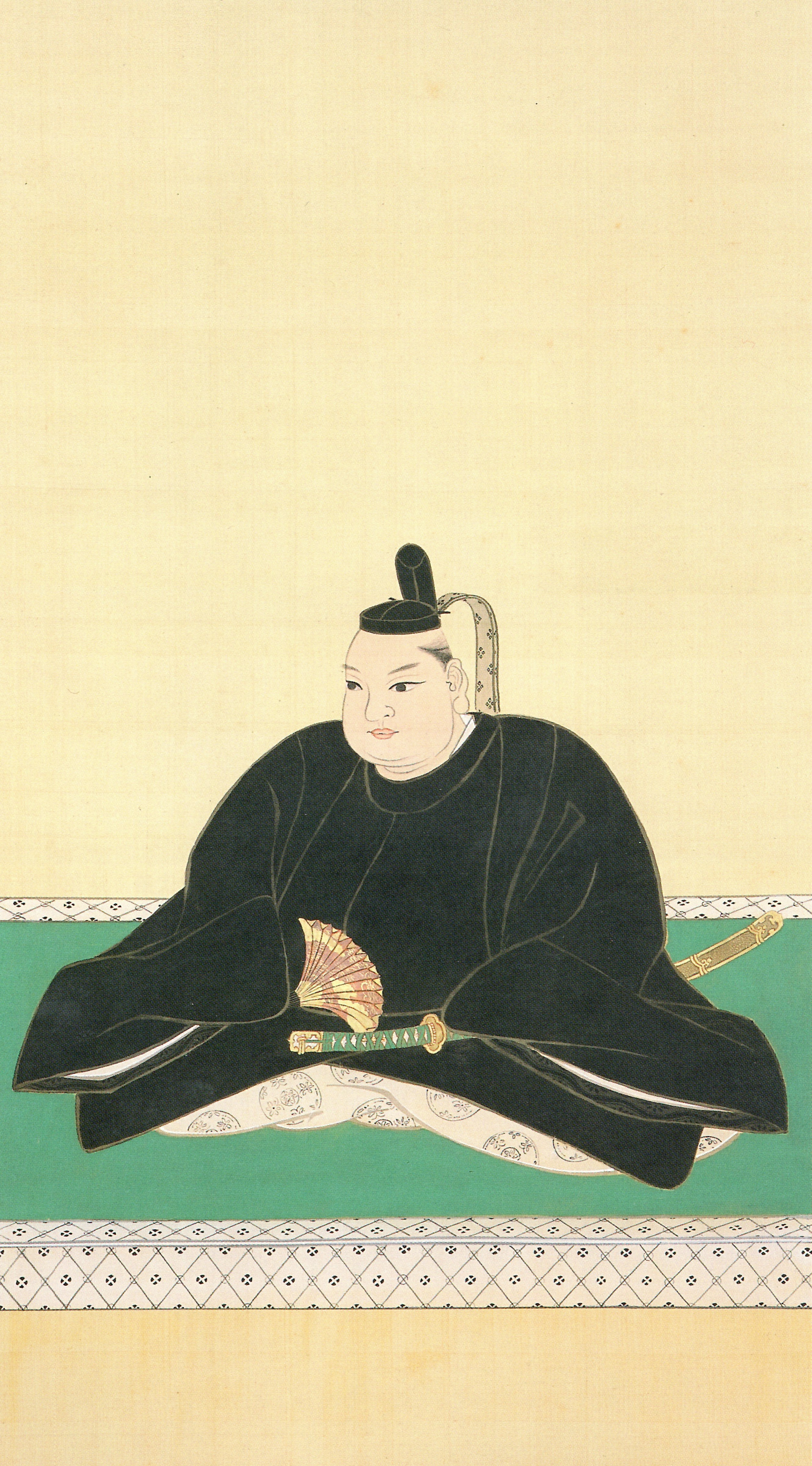

Hachisuka Yoshishige (蜂須賀 至鎮, February 20, 1586 – March 29, 1620) was a Japanese daimyō of the Edo period, who ruled the Tokushima Domain. His court title was Awa no kami. He married Manhime (1592–1666), daughter of Ogasawara Hidemasa and the great-granddaughter of Tokugawa Ieyasu.

Yoshishige fought during the Siege of Osaka at the Battle of Kizugawa.

== Family ==
- Father: Hachisuka Iemasa
- Mother: Jiko-in (1563-1606)
- Wife: Manhime (1592–1666)
- Children:
  - Hachisuka Tadateru by Manhime
  - Mihohime (1603-1632) married Ikeda Tadakatsu by Manhime
  - Shotokuin (1614-1683) married Mizuno Narisada by Manhime

Preceded by none	1st (Hachisuka) Lord of Tokushima; 1601–1620	Succeeded by Hachisuka Tadateru
