= Hachisuka Narihiro =

Japanese daimyo

- 蜂須賀 斉裕
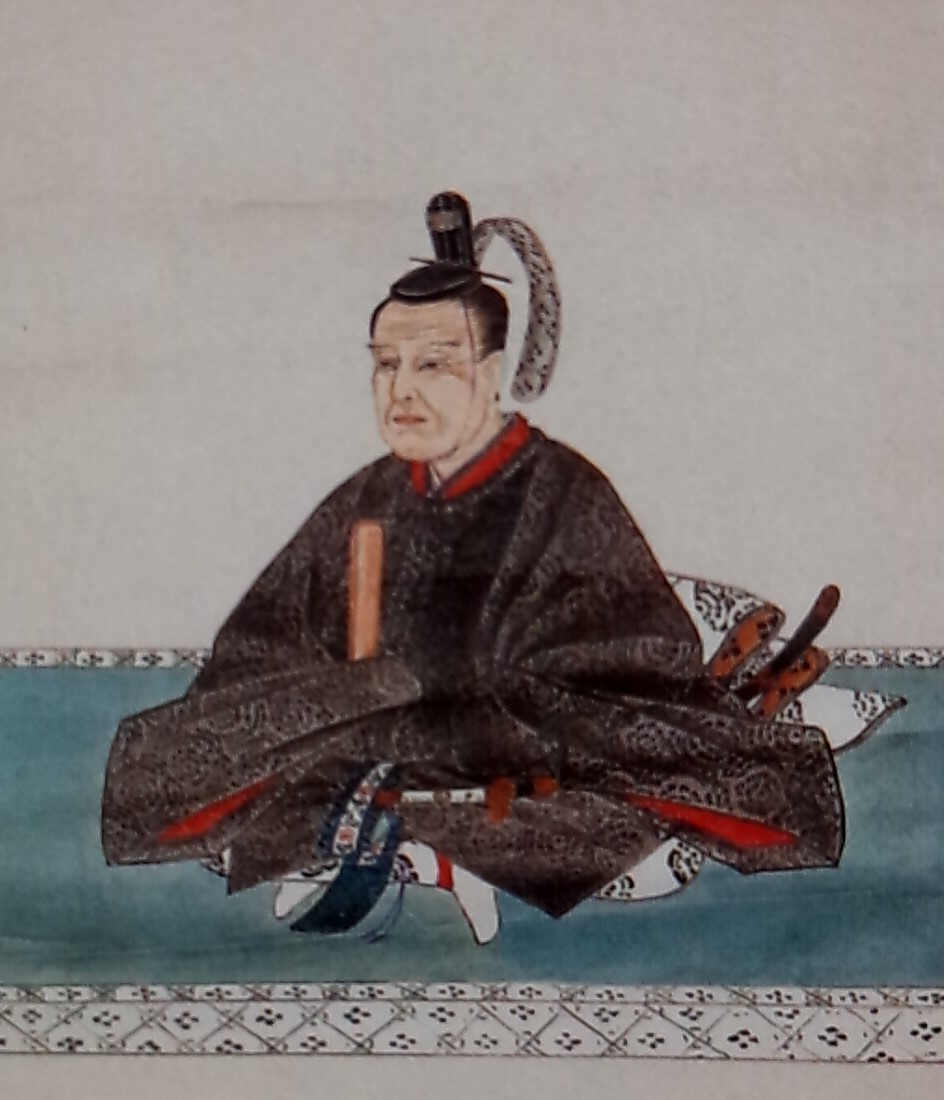

Lord of Tokushima
- In office 1843–1868
- Preceded by: Hachisuka Narimasa
- Succeeded by: Hachisuka Mochiaki

Personal details
- Born: October 14, 1821 Edo, Japan
- Died: January 30, 1868 (aged 46)

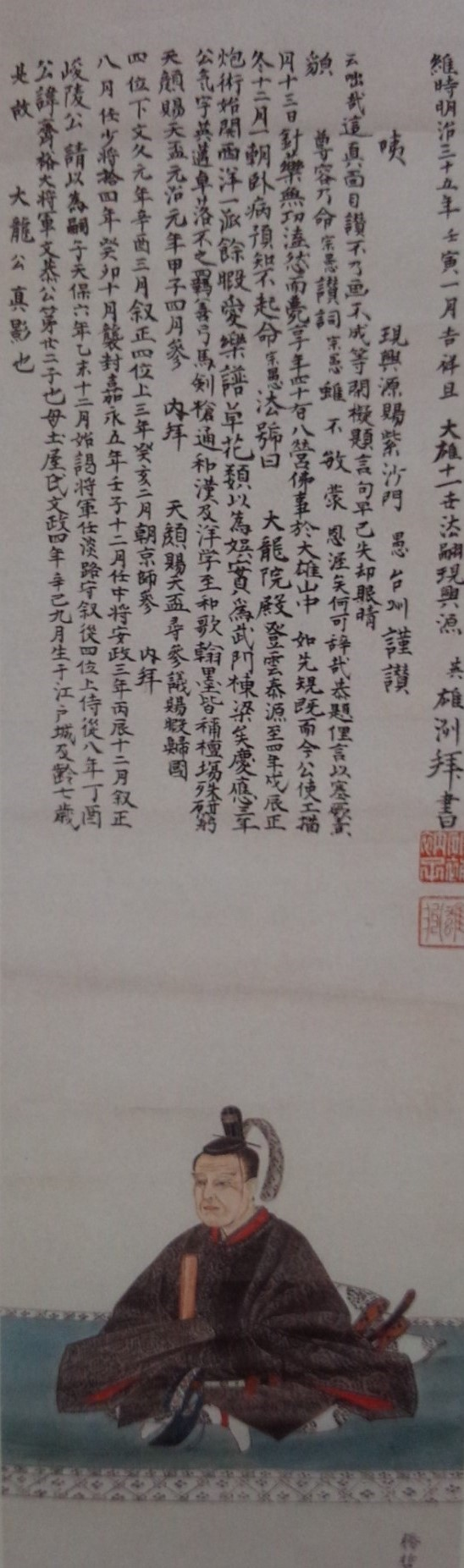
Hachisuka Narihiro

Hachisuka Narihiro (蜂須賀 斉裕; October 14, 1821 – January 30, 1868) was a Japanese daimyō of the late Edo period, who ruled the Tokushima Domain. He was a son of the eleventh shōgun, Tokugawa Ienari.

== Biography ==
As stated above, Narihiro was a son of the 11th shōgun, Ienari. Ienari had many children, who were given in adoption to various daimyō families throughout the country; Narihiro was given to the Tokushima lord, Hachisuka Narimasa, as an adopted heir. Narihiro succeeded to family headship in 1843, and engaged in a variety of reforms, intended to ease the issues of peasant revolt which Narimasa's mismanagement had caused. He continued his headship until 1868, when he was succeeded by Hachisuka Mochiaki.

== Family ==
- Father: Tokugawa Ienari
- Mother: Oyae no Kata (?-1843) later Kaishun'in
- Wife: Takatsukasa Shinako (1820-1858), daughter of Takatsukasa Masamichi
- Children:
  - Kayohime (1848-1865), died young and was a fiancée of Matsudaira Mochiaki
  - Hachisuka Mochiaki

== Ancestry ==
Ancestors of Hachisuka Narihiro

16. Tokugawa Yoshimune, 8th Tokugawa Shōgun (1684-1751)
8. Tokugawa Munetada, 1st Hitotsubashi-Tokugawa family head (1721-1765)
17. Shinshin'in (1700-1721)
4. Tokugawa Harusada, 2nd Hitotsubashi-Tokugawa family head (1751-1827)
9. Hosoda (O-Yukanokata)
2. Tokugawa Ienari, 11th Tokugawa Shōgun (1773-1841)
10. Iwamoto Masatoshi
5. O-Tominokata (d. 1817)
11. Umeda
1. Hachisuka Narihiro, 13th Lord of Tokushima
6. Makino Tadakatsu
3. Kaishun'in (d. 1843)

Preceded by Hachisuka Narimasa	13th (Hachisuka) lord of Tokushima; 1843–1868	Succeeded by Hachisuka Mochiaki
