= Hachisuka Shigeyoshi =

Japanese daimyo

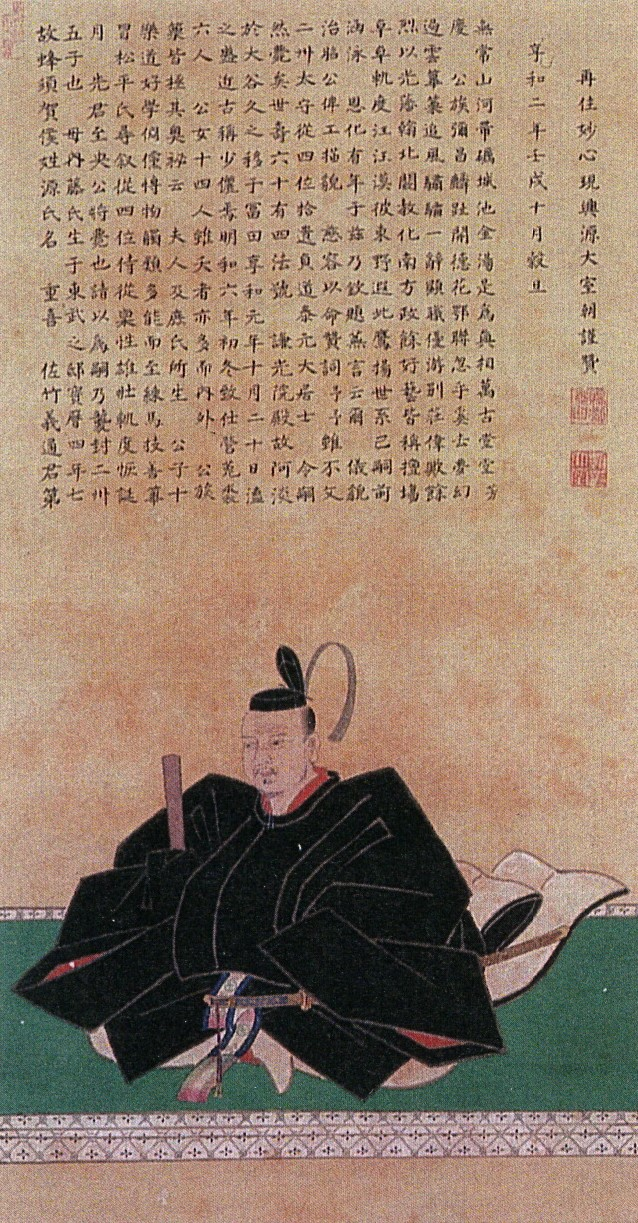

Hachisuka Shigeyoshi (蜂須賀 重喜, April 15, 1738 – November 25, 1801) was a Japanese daimyō of the Edo period, who ruled the Tokushima Domain. His court title was Awa no kami.

His daughter married the court noble Takatsukasa Masahiro.

== Family ==
- Father: Satake Yoshimichi (1701-1765)
- Mother: daughter of Naito Masamori
- Wife: Tsutehime
- Concubines:
  - Yanada-ji
  - Lady Kiso
  - Ochie no Kata
  - Osaki no Kata
  - commoner
- Children:
  - Hachisuka Haruaki by Tsutehime
  - Hachisuka Yoshikuni by Tsutehime
  - Hachisuka Yoshinori by Tsutehime
  - Hachisuka Yoshinobu by Tsutehime
  - Hachisuka Nobutoshi by Yanada-ji
  - Nariko (1771-1795) married Takatsukasa Masahiro by Yanada-ji
  - Yukiko (1771-1838) married Daigo Teruhisa by Yanada-ji
  - Hachisuka Nobumura by Lady Kiso
  - daughter married Nakanoin Michitomo by Lady Kiso
  - Sadahime married Matsudaira Tadashige by Ochie no Kata
  - Hachisuka Nobuyori by Ochie no Kata
  - Sumihime married Matsudaira Mitsutsura by Ochie no Kata
  - Iyohime (1791-1854) married Tozawa Masatsugu by Ochie no Kata
  - Hachisuka Nobuzumi by Osaki no Kata
  - Hachisuka Akiyoshi by Commoner
  - Hachisuka Akinori by Commoner
  - Hachisuka Akihide by Commoner
  - Morihime married Hori Chikashige by Commoner
  - Ryuhime married Kuki Takakuni by Commoner

== Ancestry ==
Ancestors of Hachisuka Shigeyoshi

16. Satake Yoshichika (1619-1702)
8. Satake Yoshihide (1645-1721)
17. Satake
4. Satake Yoshimoto (1675-1752)
18. Yoshikawa Yoshimasa
9. Yoshikawa
2. Satake Yoshimichi, 2nd Lord of Kubota-Shinden (1701-1765)
20. Koga Hiromichi (1626-1674)
10. Koga Michijo (1647-1723)
5. Hirohata
22. Saionji Kinmitsu (1622-1651)
11. Saionji
23. Matsudaira
1. Hachisuka Shigeyoshi, 10th Lord of Tokushima
24. Naitō Masaharu, 1st Lord of Izumi (1626-1645)
12. Naitō Masachika, 2nd Lord of Izumi (1645-1696)
25. Tsuchiya
6. Naitō Masamori, 1st Lord of Annaka (1683-1738)
13. Abe
3. Naitō
14. Soshi Sadaaki
7. Soshi

| Preceded by Hachisuka Yoshihiro | 10th (Hachisuka) Lord of Tokushima; 1754–1769 | Succeeded by Hachisuka Haruaki |
