= Tokushima Domain =

Feudal domain in Edo period Japan

Tokushima Domain 徳島藩
- under Tokugawa shogunate Japan
- 1601–1871
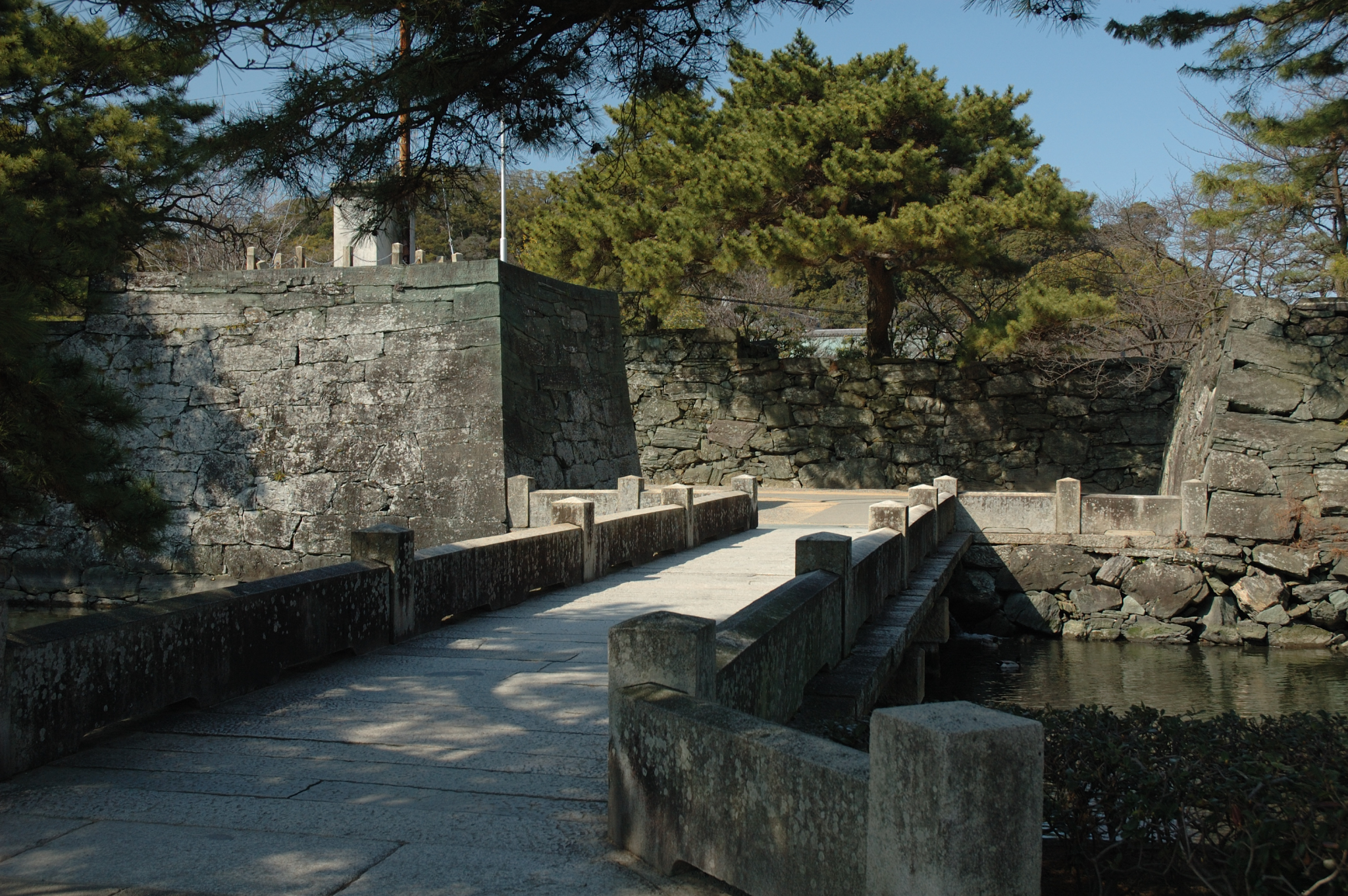
- Tokushima Castle

- Mon of the Hachisuka clan
- Capital: Tokushima Castle
- Area
  - Coordinates: 34°4′30.69″N 134°33′18.99″E
- Government
  - Type: Daimyō
- Historical era: Edo period
  - Established: 1601
  - Hachisuka clan: 1601
  - Disestablished: 1871
- Today part of: Tokushima Prefecture and Awaji Island

Location of Tokushima Castle
Tokushima Domain (Japan)

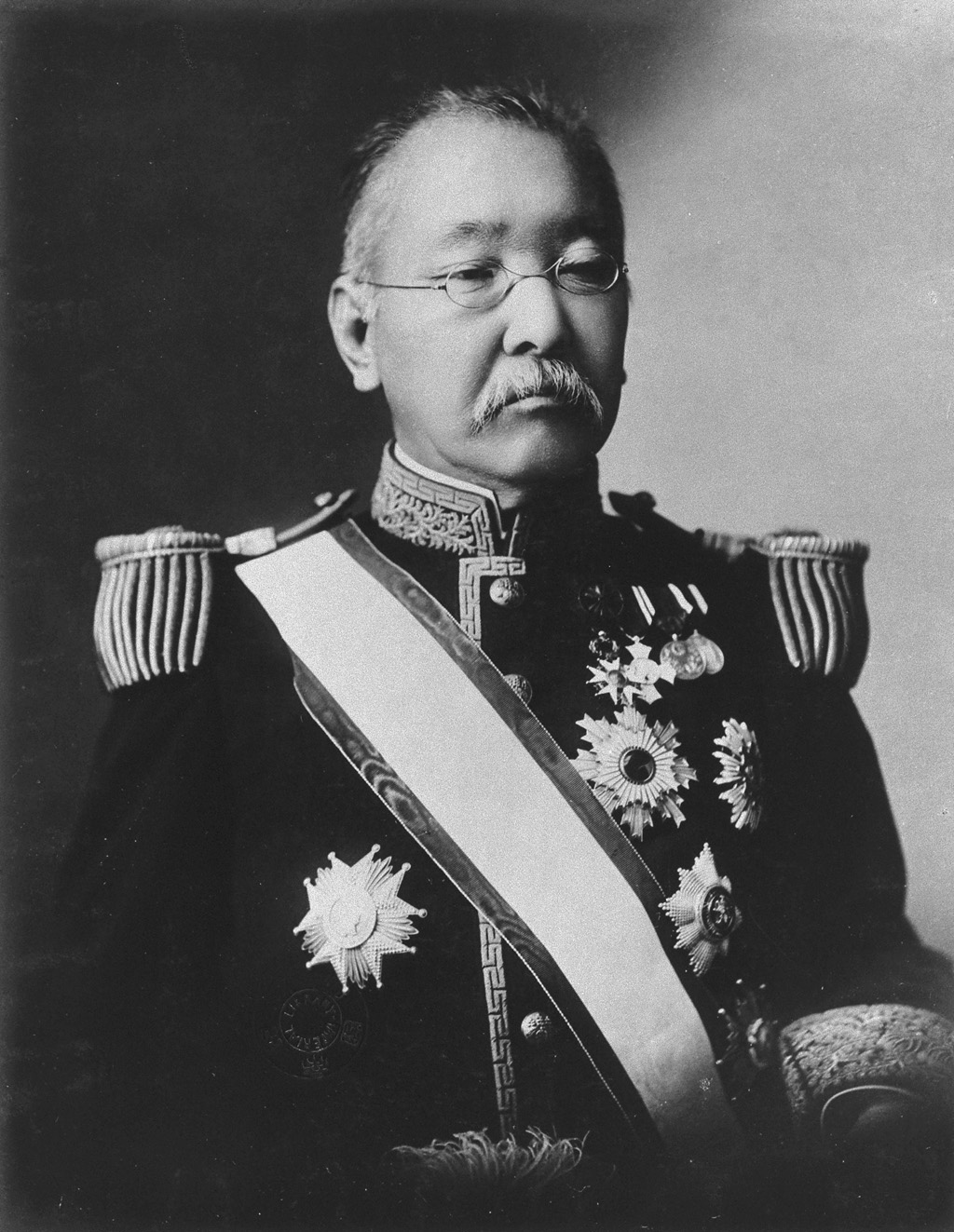
Marquess Hachisuka Mochiaki

Tokushima Domain (徳島藩, Tokushima-han) was a feudal domain under the Tokugawa shogunate of Edo period Japan, controlling all of Awa Province and Awaji Province in what is now Tokushima Prefecture and Awaji Island of modern-day Hyōgo Prefecture. It was centered around Tokushima Castle, and was ruled throughout its history by the tozama daimyō Hachisuka clan.

== History ==
Hachisuka Masakatsu was a vassal of Toyotomi Hideyoshi and dominated Tatsuno in Harima Province. He was awarded territories in Awa Province after Hideyoshi's conquest of Shikoku in 1585; however, due to his advanced age, he turned the clan chieftainship over to his son Hachisuka Iemasa. At the time, his territory was only a portion of Awa Province, with a kokudaka of 175,000 koku. He constructed Tokushima Castle, which would remain the clan's seat for the next 300 years. The clan had always been on bad terms with Ishida Mitsunari and at the time of the Battle of Sekigahara, Mitsunari forced Hachisuka Iemasa to take the tonsure and forcibly exiled him to Mount Koya. However, his son Hachisuka Yoshishige was married an adopted daughter of Tokugawa Ieyasu, and fought in the Eastern Army. As a result, the Tokugawa Shogunate restored the Hachisuka clan to their domains after the defeat of the Toyotomi clan and Hachisuka Yoshishige is regarded as the first daimyō of Tokushima Domain. Hachisuka Yoshishige went on to receive awards seven times from Shogun Tokugawa Hidetada for his actions at the 1614–1615 Battle of Osaka and his territories were expanded to cover all of Awa Province, as well as 70,000 koku in Awaji Province. In 1617, he was granted the remainder of Awaji Island, bringing his total kokudaka to 257,000 koku.

Tokushima Domain developed indigo production in the Yoshino River basin, with Indigo dye much in demand throughout the Edo Period. Indigo merchants in Tokushima almost monopolized the national market due to the quality and strong backing of the clan, and was a major source of the domain's "unofficial" revenue. Although the domain's nominal kokudaka was 257,000 koku, its actual kokudaka through clan monopolies on indigo, tobacco, salt and other products came to more than 400,000 koku.

The 13th daimyō, Hachisuka Narihiro, was the 22nd son of Shogun Tokugawa Ienari, and was therefore half-brother of the 12th Shogun Tokugawa Ieyoshi and nephew of the 13th Shogun Tokugawa Iesada. Despite these connections, during the Bakumatsu period, he maintained contacts with the Imperial Court in Kyoto and was a supporter of the kōbu gattai movement, which created frictions within the domain, especially with the hereditary karō, the Inada clan, who ruled Sumoto Castle on Awaji and who favored a more reactionary approach. He died suddenly during the Battle of Toba-Fushimi at the start of the Boshin War at the age of 48. His son Hachisuka Mochiaki switched the domain's allegiance to the Imperial side. He became imperial governor of Tokushima following the abolition of the han system and subsequently served as a cabinet minister and president of the House of Peers in the Meiji government. The Hachisuka clan was ennobled with the kazoku title of marquis in 1884.

In the early Meiji period, the hereditary karō and warden of Sumoto Castle, Inada Kurobei, demanded establishment as a daimyō. With his kokudaka exceeding 10,000 koku, this was technically possible; however, this demand met with violent opposition from Tokushima and was refused by the Meiji government. After the "revolt" was put down, the entire Inada clan and its retainers were exiled to the far northern tip of Hokkaido. Their experiences are fictionalized in the recent film Kita no Zeronen ("Year One in the North").

The Awa Province portion of Tokushima Domain became Tokushima prefecture; however, the Awaji Province portion became part of Hyōgo Prefecture.

== Holdings at the end of the Edo period ==
Unlike most domains in the han system, which consisted of several discontinuous territories calculated to provide the assigned kokudaka, based on periodic cadastral surveys and projected agricultural yields, Tokushima Domain was a single unified holding.

- Awa Province (entire province)
  - 55 villages in Myodo District
  - 38 villages in Myozai District
  - 129 villages in Itano District
  - 31 villages in Awa District
  - 28 villages in Oe District
  - 19 villages in Mima District
  - 29 villages in Miyoshi District
  - 64 villages in Kaifu District
  - 135 villages in Naka District
  - 45 villages in Katsuura District
- Awaji Province (entire province)
  - 124 villages in Tsuna District
  - 134 villages in Mihara District

== List of daimyō ==
#	Name	Tenure	Courtesy title	Court Rank	kokudaka
Hachisuka clan, 1600–1871 (Tozama)
1	Hachisuka Yoshishige (蜂須賀至鎮)	1601–1620	Awa-no-kami (阿波守)	Junior 4th Rank, Lower Grade (従四位下)	175,000 -> 257,000 koku
2	Hachisuka Tadateru (蜂須賀忠英)	1620–1652	Awa-no-kami (阿波守); Jijū (侍従)	Junior 4th Rank, Lower Grade (従四位下)	257,000 koku
3	Hachisuka Mitsutaka (蜂須賀光隆)	1652–1666	Awa-no-kami (阿波守); Jijū (侍従)	Junior 4th Rank, Lower Grade (従四位下)	257,000 koku
4	Hachisuka Tsunamichi (蜂須賀綱通)	1666–1678	Awa-no-kami (阿波守); Jijū (侍従)	Junior 4th Rank, Lower Grade (従四位下)	257,000 koku
5	Hachisuka Tsunanori (蜂須賀綱矩)	1678–1728	Awa-no-kami (阿波守); Jijū (侍従)	Junior 4th Rank, Lower Grade (従四位下)	257,000 koku
6	Hachisuka Munekazu (蜂須賀宗員)	1728–1735	Awa-no-kami (阿波守); Jijū (侍従)	Junior 4th Rank, Lower Grade (従四位下)	257,000 koku
7	Hachisuka Muneteru (蜂須賀宗英)	1735–1739	Awa-no-kami (阿波守); Jijū (侍従)	Junior 4th Rank, Lower Grade (従四位下)	257,000 koku
8	Hachisuka Muneshige (蜂須賀宗鎮)	1739–1754	Awa-no-kami (阿波守); Jijū (侍従); Mokuryō-no-kami (木工頭)	Junior 4th Rank, Lower Grade (従四位下)	257,000 koku
9	Hachisuka Yoshihiro (蜂須賀至央)	1754–1754	none -	none-	257,000 koku
10	Hachisuka Shigeyoshi (蜂須賀重喜)	1754–1769	Awa-no-kami (阿波守); Jijū (侍従); Oiryō-no-kami (大炊頭)	Junior 4th Rank, Lower Grade (従四位下)	257,000 koku
11	Hachisuka Haruaki (蜂須賀治昭)	1769–1813	Awa-no-kami (阿波守)	Junior 4th Rank, Lower Grade (従四位下)	257,000 koku
12	Hachisuka Narimasa (蜂須賀斉昌)	1813–1843	Awa-no-kami (阿波守); Jijū (侍従)	Junior 4th Rank, Lower Grade (従四位下)	257,000 koku
13	Hachisuka Narihiro (蜂須賀斉裕)	1843–1868	Awa-no-kami (阿波守); Sangi (参議)	Senrior 4th Rank, Upper Grade (正四位上)	257,000 koku
14	Hachisuka Mochiaki (蜂須賀茂韶)	1868–1871	Awa-no-kami (阿波守); Jijū (侍従)	Junior 4th Rank, Upper Grade (従四位上)	257,000 koku

=== Genealogy (simplified) ===
- TOKUGAWA IEYASU, 1st Tokugawa shōgun (1543–1616)
  - Matsudaira Nobuyasu (1559–1579), m. Tokuhime (1559–1636)
    - Toku (1576–1607), m. Ogasawara Hidemasa, 1st daimyō of Matsumoto (1569–1615)
      - Kyōdaiin (1592–1666), m. I. Hachisuka Yoshishige, 1st daimyō of Tokushima (cr. 1601) (1586–1620; r. 1601–1620)
        - II. Tadateru, 2nd daimyō of Tokushima (1611–1652; r. 1620–1652)
          - III. Mitsutaka, 3rd daimyō of Tokushima (1630–1666; r. 1652–1666)
            - IV. Tsunamichi, 4th daimyō of Tokushima (1656–1678; r. 1666–1678)
          - Takamori (1642–1695)
            - V. Tsunanori, 5th daimyō of Tokushima (1661–1730; r. 1678–1728)
              - VI. Munekazu, 6th daimyō of Tokushima (1709–1735; r. 1728–1735)
              - Yoshitake (1692–1725)
                - A daughter (d. 1742), m. VIII. Muneshige, 8th daimyō of Tokushima (see below)
          - Takayoshi (1643–1698)
            - VII. Muneteru, 7th daimyō of Tokushima (1684–1743; r. 1735–1739). The direct line of the Hachisuka family became extinct with the death of the 7th lord in 1743; he adopted a distant cousin from the Matsudaira-Tokugawa family to continue the line:
  - Tokugawa Yorinobu, 1st Lord of Kishu (1602–1671)
    - Tokugawa Mitsusada, 2nd Lord of Kishu (1627–1705)
      - Tokugawa Yoshimune, 8th Tokugawa shōgun (1684–1751)
        - Tokugawa Munetada, 1st Hitotsubashi-Tokugawa family head (1721–1765)
          - Tokugawa Harusada, 2nd Hitotsubashi-Tokugawa family head (1751–1827)
            - Tokugawa Ienari, 11th Tokugawa shōgun (1773–1841)
              - XIII. Hachisuka (Tokugawa) Narihiro, 13th daimyō of Tokushima (1821–1868; r. 1843–1868), m. Takatsukasa Shinako (1820–1858 – see below)
                - XIV. Mochiaki, 14th daimyō of Tokushima, 1st Marquess (1846–1918; Lord: 1868; Governor of Tokushima: 1869–1871; family head: 1869–1918; Marquess: 1884)
                  - Masaaki, 2nd Marquess (1871–1932; 2nd Marquess and family head: 1918–1932)
                    - Masauji, 3rd Marquess (1903–1953; 3rd Marquess and family head: 1932–1947; family head: 1932–1953)
                      - Masako (b. 1941; family head 1953–present)
  - Tokugawa Yorifusa, 1st daimyō of Mito (1603–1661)
    - Matsudaira Yorishige, 1st daimyō of Takamatsu (1622–1695)
      - Matsudaira Yoriyoshi (1667–1706)
        - Matsudaira Yorihiro, Head of the Matsudaira-Daizen line (1700–1737)
          - VIII. (Matsudaira) Hachisuka Muneshige, 8th daimyō of Tokushima (1721–1780; r. 1739–1754). Adopted by the 7th Lord.
          - IX. (Matsudaira) Hachisuka Yoshihiro, 9th daimyō of Tokushima (1737–1754; r. 1754). He adopted the 10th Lord:
          - X. (Satake) Hachisuka Shigeyoshi, 10th daimyō of Tokushima (1738–1801; r. 1754–1769). Son of Satake Yoshimichi, 2nd Lord of Iwasaki. He had issue:
            - XI. Haruaki, 11th daimyō of Tokushima (1758–1814; r. 1769–1813)
              - XII. Narimasa, 12th daimyō of Tokushima (1795–1859; r. 1813–1843)
            - Hachisuka Noriko (1771–1795), m. Takatsukasa Masahiro (1761–1841)
              - Takatsukasa Masamichi (1789–1868)
                - Takatsukasa Shinako (1820–1858), m. XIII. Hachisuka (Tokugawa) Narihiro, 13th daimyō of Tokushima - see above

== See also ==
- List of Han
- Abolition of the han system
