= 2020 Summer Olympics torch relay =

- Host city: Tokyo, Japan
- Countries visited: Greece, Japan
- Distance: 20,000 kilometres (12,000 mi)
- Theme: Hope Lights Our Way
- Start date: 12 March 2020 (Greece); 25 March 2021 (Japan relay)
- End date: 25 March 2020 (Japan); 23 July 2021 (Japan relay)

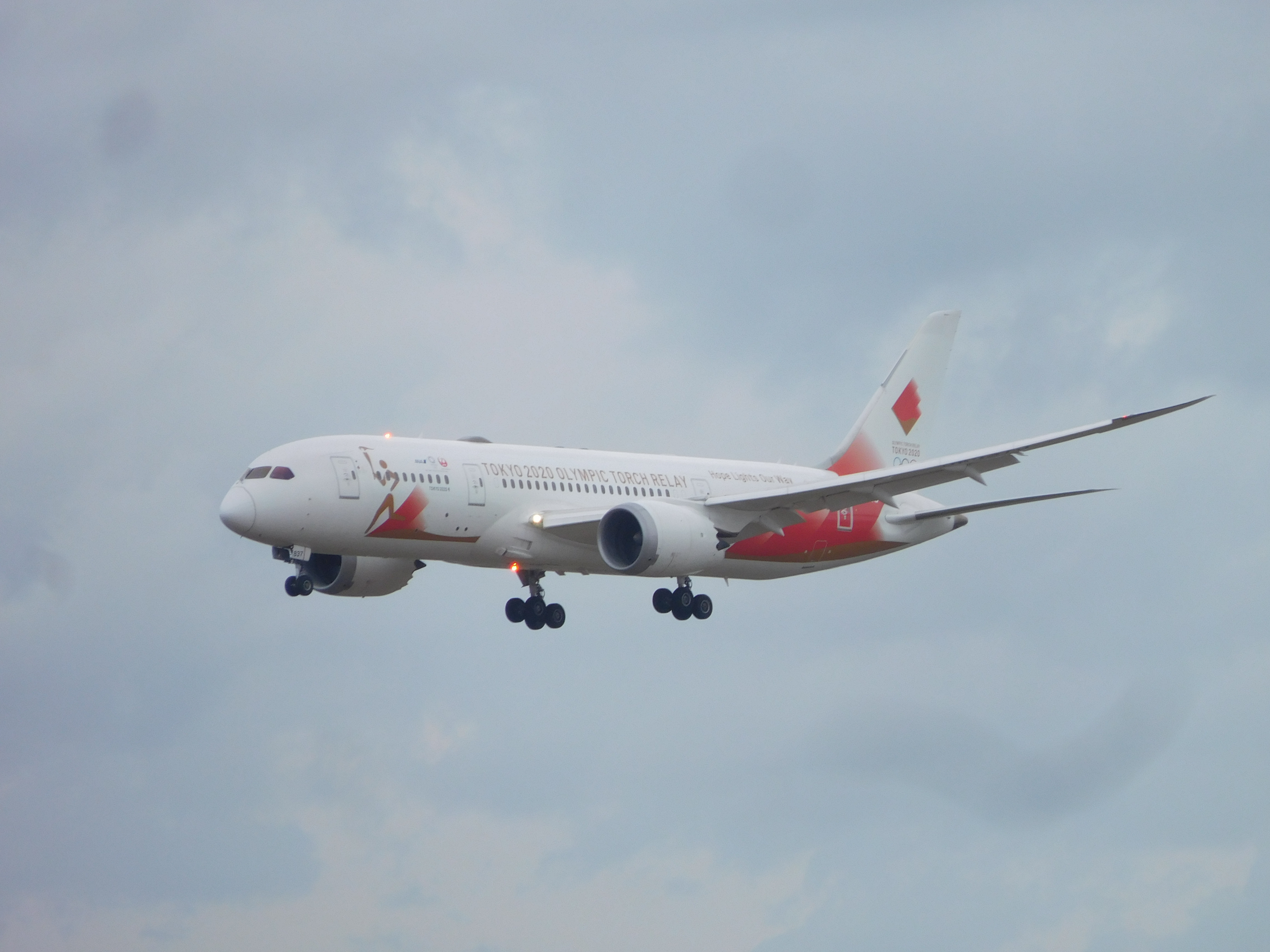
Olympic flame Transport aircraft. Japan Airlines Boeing 787-8 (JA837J)

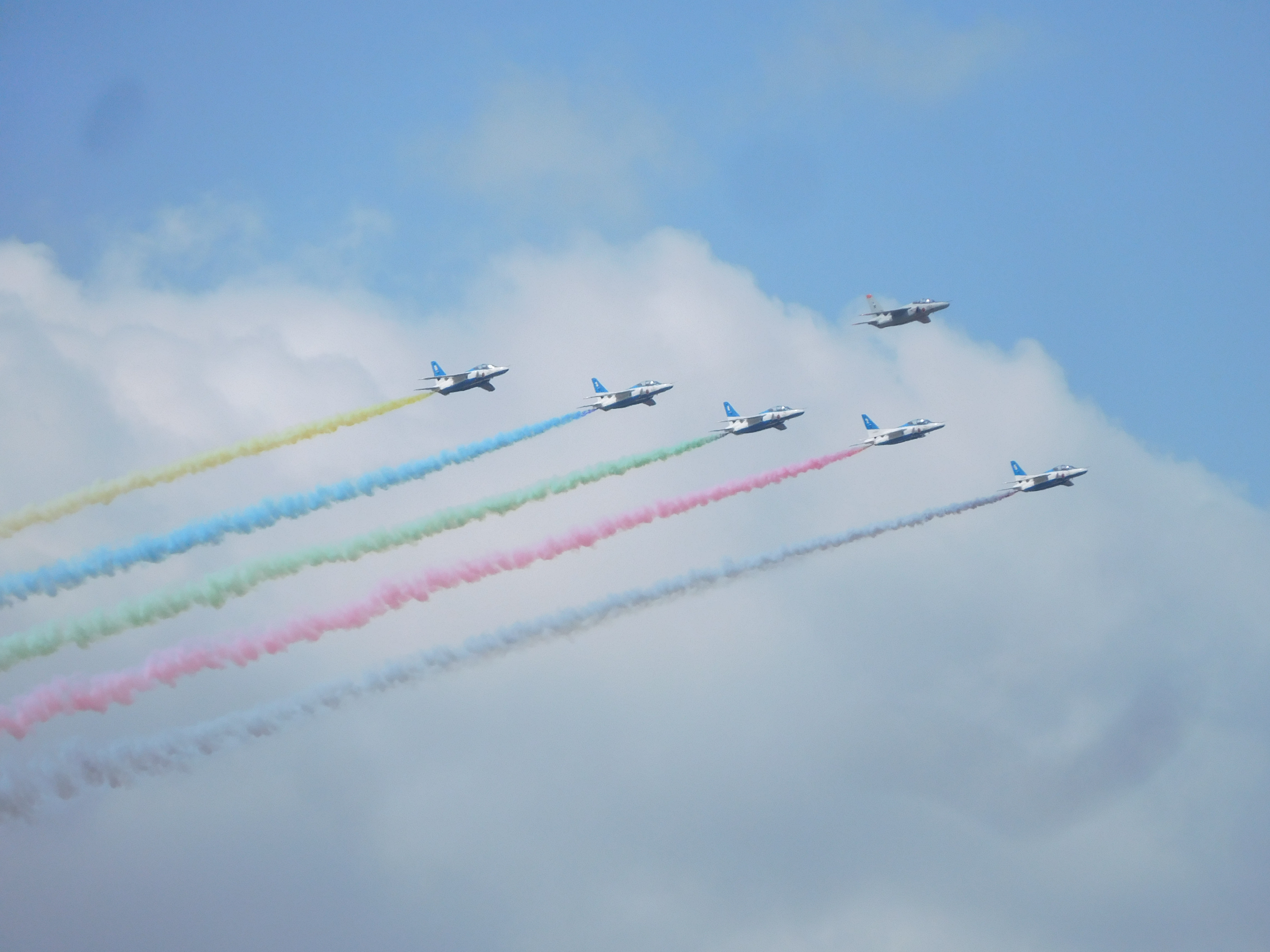
Blue Impulse at the Olympic flame arrival ceremony on March 20, 2020

The 2020 Summer Olympics torch relay was held from 12 March 2020 and ended on 23 July 2021. After being lit in Olympia, Greece, the torch was handed over to the Olympic shooting Gold medallist Anna Korakaki, who became the relay originating Olympian woman of the 2020 Summer Olympics torch relay. It was then transported to Athens on 19 March by official airliner Japan Airlines. The Japanese leg began in Fukushima, and ended in Tokyo's New National Stadium, the main venue of the 2020 Olympics. It makes a tour of Japanese cities, including all 47 prefecture capitals. The torch was scheduled to visit two remote island groups which are part of Tokyo. The end of the relay was the finale of the 2020 Summer Olympics opening ceremony on 23 July 2021. Toyota, NTT, ENEOS, Nippon Life, JAL, ANA and Japan Post Holdings are the presenting partners of the relay, with the slogan being "Hope Lights Our Way".

The torch relay was changed due to the COVID-19 pandemic. The planned relay leg through Greece was cancelled, and both the lighting ceremony in Olympia and the handover ceremony in Athens had no public attendance. The relay was suspended on 25 March 2020, a day before the Japanese relay was due to start, and the torch was moved to Tokyo for exhibition until the relay resumed as planned on 25 March 2021.

== Torches ==
The Olympic torch was designed by Tokujin Yoshioka and unveiled 19 March 2019; the design is inspired by cherry blossoms, with 5 petal-shaped columns around the tip of the torch, and a rose-gold "sakura gold" color finish. Their construction will incorporate aluminum recycled from unused shelters deployed in the aftermath of the 2011 Tōhoku earthquake and tsunami.

== Route in Greece ==
The traditional lighting ceremony was held on 12 March 2020 at Olympia, Greece, and the torch was handed over to the first torchbearer, Anna Korakaki. Due to the COVID-19 pandemic, it was the first lighting ceremony since 1984 to be held without spectators. The handover ceremony was held at Panathenaic Stadium in Athens on 19 March. The torch was to visit 31 cities and 15 landmarks across Greece, but due to the coronavirus pandemic, it was cancelled. On 13 March, a small ceremony was held in Sparta, the notable torchbearer was Scottish actor Gerard Butler, known for playing Leonidas in the movie 300 in commemorating with the 2,500th anniversary of the Battle of Thermopylae.

- 12 March 2020: Olympia, Amaliada, Pyrgos, Kyparissia, Kalamata
- 13 March 2020 (rest of the day cancelled): Sparta, Tripoli, Nafplio, Megara, Piraeus
- 14 March 2020 (cancelled): Kastellorizo, Agios Nikolaos, Rethymno, Chania
- 15 March 2020 (cancelled): Thermopylae, Volos, Thessaloniki, Chania
- 16 March 2020 (cancelled): Kavala, Alexandroupoli
- 17 March 2020 (cancelled): Amphipolis, Vergina, Meteora
- 18 March 2020 (cancelled): Marathon, Sounion, Athens
- 19 March 2020: Panathenaic Stadium

== Special display ==
As the damage from the 2011 Tōhoku earthquake and tsunami mostly affected three prefectures, Miyagi, Iwate and Fukushima, a special torch display known as "Flame of Recovery" will be held in these three prefectures. The flame first arrived at Matsushima Air Field before being displayed at the locations below.

- 20 March 2020: Ishinomaki Minamihama Tsunami Recovery Memorial Park, Ishinomaki
- 21 March 2020: Sendai Station, Sendai
- 22 March 2020: Sanriku Railway and the SL Ginga Steam Locomotive Express (between Miyako, Kamaishi and Hanamaki Stations)
- 23 March 2020: Kyassen Ofunato, Ōfunato
- 24 March 2020: Fukushima Station, Fukushima
- 25 March 2020: Aquamarine Fukushima, Iwaki

After the postponement of the Summer Olympics to 2021, the torch display remained in Fukushima for at least a month before subsequently moved to Tokyo. The Olympic Flame would be later placed on display at Japan Olympic Museum from 1 September 2020 until 30 November 2020. The restart of the relay took place on 25 March 2021 for the rescheduled Olympics.

== Route in Japan ==
Simplified map of the 2020 Summer Olympics torch relay route.

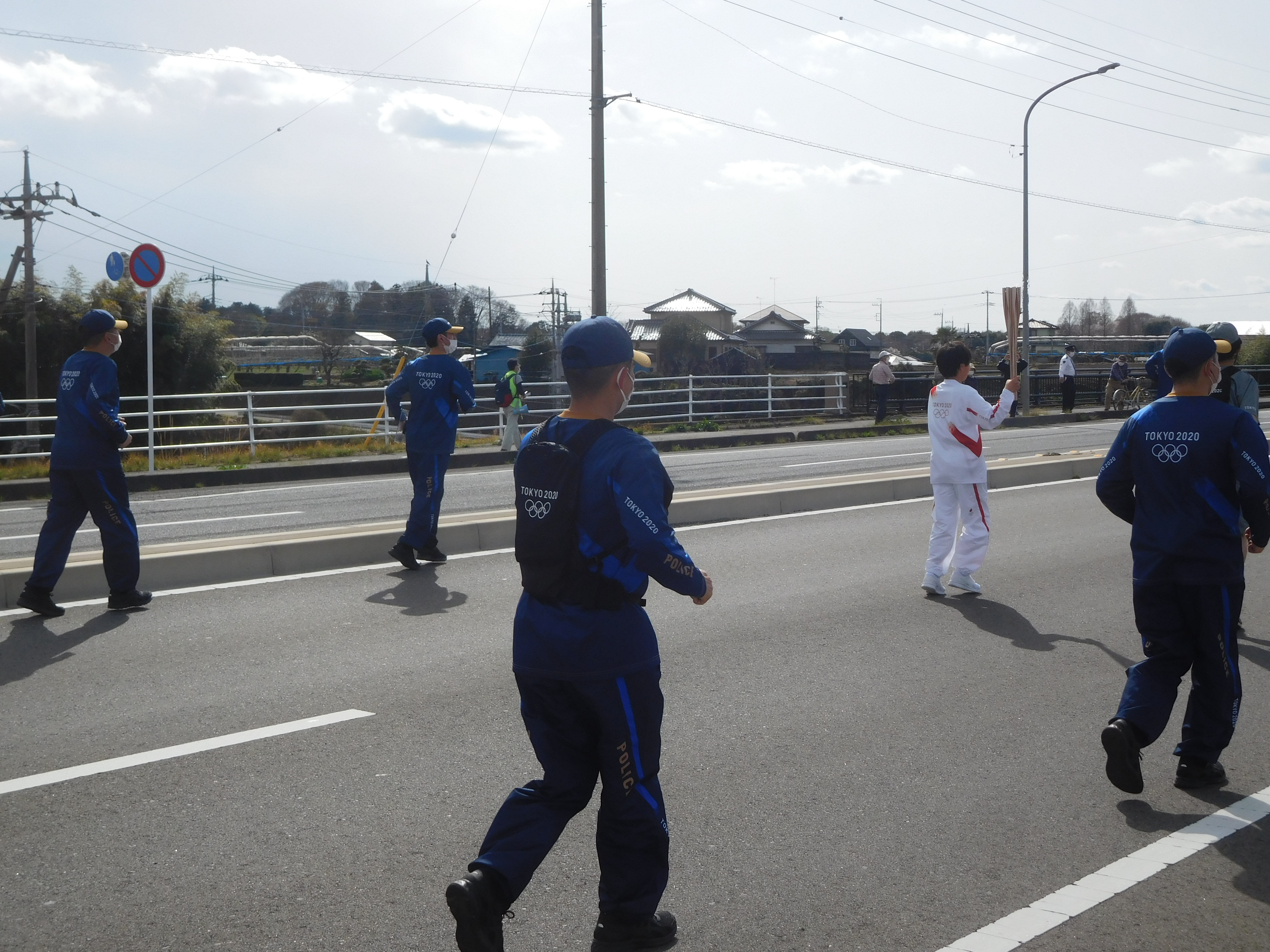
Day 5: The torch in Mibu, Tochigi with social distancing measures are in place.

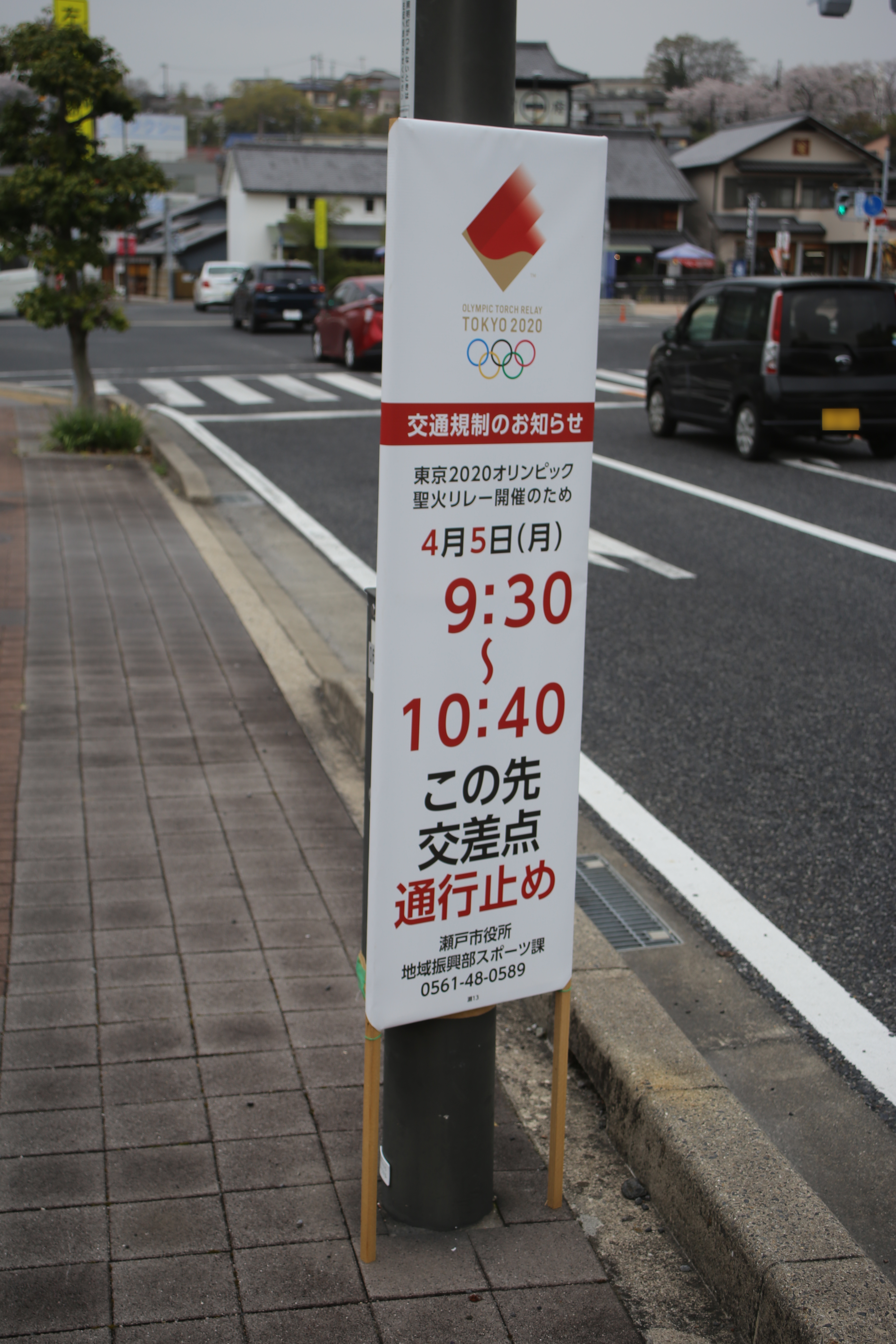
Day 12: A sign in Seto, Aichi put on the electrical post reminding citizens the flame is passing through the town

The original schedule of the torch relay in Japan was from 26 March to 24 July 2020. After the postponement of the Summer Olympics to 2021, all relays were delayed by 364 days (one day less than a full year to preserve the same days of the week). This change was not announced until 28 September 2020. The following table is taken from the original 2020 schedule:

Prefecture	Route	Map
Fukushima	25 March 2021 (day 1): Naraha to Minamisoma: Naraha; Hirono; Iwaki; Hirono; Kawauchi; Ōkuma; Futaba; Tomioka; Katsurao; Namie; Minamisōma; 26 March 2021 (day 2): Sōma to Aizuwakamatsu: Sōma; Iitate; Shinchi; Kawamata; Fukushima; Inawashiro; Mishima; Kitakata; Aizuwakamatsu; 27 March 2021 (day 3): Minamiaizu to Koriyama: Minamiaizu; Shimogō; Shirakawa; Sukagawa; Tamura; Motomiya; Kōriyama	2020 Summer Olympics torch relay is located in Fukushima Prefecture
Tochigi	28 March 2021 (day 4): Ashikaga to Nasukarasuyama: Ashikaga; Sano; Oyama; Motegi; Tochigi; Kaminokawa; Mooka; Kaminokawa; Nasukarasuyama; 29 March 2021 (day 5): Nasu to Utsunomiya: Nasu; Sakura; Nasushiobara; Mashiko; Mibu; Nikkō; Kanuma; Utsunomiya	2020 Summer Olympics torch relay is located in Tochigi Prefecture
Gunma	30 March 2021 (day 6): Tatebayashi to Maebashi: Tatebayashi; Ōizumi; Ōta; Ueno; Kiryū; Isesaki; Maebashi; 31 March 2021 (day 7): Shibukawa to Takasaki: Shibukawa; Kusatsu; Numata; Kawaba; Naganohara; Fujioka; Tomioka; Takasaki	2020 Summer Olympics torch relay is located in Gunma Prefecture
Nagano	1 April 2021 (day 8): Karuizawa to Nagano: Karuizawa; Saku; Yamanouchi; Ueda; Nozawaonsen; Hakuba; Nagano; 2 April 2021 (day 9): Iida to Matsumoto: Iida; Nagiso; Ina; Suwa; Ōmachi; Azumino; Matsumoto	2020 Summer Olympics torch relay is located in Nagano Prefecture
Gifu	3 April 2021 (day 10): Nakatsugawa to Takayama: Nakatsugawa; Tajimi; Yaotsu; Gujō; Takayama; 4 April 2021 (day 11): Gero to Gifu: Gero; Kakamigahara; Sekigahara; Ōgaki; Hashima; Gifu	2020 Summer Olympics torch relay is located in Gifu Prefecture
Aichi	5 April 2021 (day 12): Seto to Nagoya: Seto; Nagoya; Kasugai; Nagoya; Ichinomiya; Inuyama; Nagoya; Inazawa; Kiyosu; Nagoya; 6 April 2021 (day 13): Toyohashi to Toyota: Toyohashi; Handa; Toyokawa; Anjō; Kariya; Okazaki; Ōbu; Toyota	2020 Summer Olympics torch relay is located in Aichi Prefecture
Mie	7 April 2021 (day 14): Yokkaichi to Ise: Yokkaichi; Suzuka; Kameyama; Tsu; Toba; Ise; 8 April 2021 (day 15): Iga to Kumano: Iga; Nabari; Matsusaka; Taiki; Kihoku; Kumano	2020 Summer Olympics torch relay is located in Mie Prefecture
Wakayama	9 April 2021 (day 16): Shingū to Wakayama: Shingū; Nachikatsuura; Kushimoto; Shirahama; Tanabe; Gobō; Arida; Kainan; Wakayama; 10 April 2021 (day 17): Wakayama to Hashimoto: Wakayama; Iwade; Kinokawa; Katsuragi; Kōyasan; Hashimoto	2020 Summer Olympics torch relay is located in Wakayama Prefecture
Nara	11 April 2021 (day 18): Gojō to Kashihara: Gojō; Gose; Katsuragi; Totsukawa; Sakurai; Tawaramoto; Tenri; Asuka; Kashihara; 12 April 2021 (day 19): Kawai to Nara: Kawai; Kōryō; Kashiba; Yamatotakada; Yoshino; Ikaruga; Yamatokōriyama; Nara; Uda; Ikoma; Nara	2020 Summer Olympics torch relay is located in Nara Prefecture
Osaka	13 April 2021 (day 20): Sakai to Suita: Sakai; Higashiōsaka; Kadoma; Hirakata; Toyonaka; Ikeda; Minoh; Ibaraki; Suita; 14 April 2021 (day 21): Izumiōtsu to Osaka: Izumiōtsu; Kaizuka; Izumi; Kishiwada; Osaka; Taishi; Kashiwara; Habikino; Fujiidera; Osaka	2020 Summer Olympics torch relay is located in Osaka Prefecture
Tokushima	15 April 2021 (day 22): Miyoshi to Naruto: Miyoshi; Higashimiyoshi; Tsurugi; Mima; Kamiyama; Awa; Yoshinogawa; Ishii; Kamiita; Itano; Kamiita; Itano; Aizumi; Kitajima; Matsushige; Naruto; 16 April 2021 (day 23): Kaiyō to Tokushima: Kaiyō; Mugi; Kamikatsu; Minami; Naka; Katsuura; Anan; Komatsushima; Sanagōchi; Tokushima	2020 Summer Olympics torch relay is located in Tokushima Prefecture
Kagawa	17 April 2021 (day 24): Utazu to Kan'onji: Utazu; Marugame; Mannō; Naoshima; Kotohira; Zentsūji; Tadotsu; Mitoyo; Kan'onji; 18 April 2021 (day 25): Sakaide to Takamatsu: Sakaide; Ayagawa; Tonoshō; Shōdoshima; Higashikagawa; Sanuki; Miki; Takamatsu	2020 Summer Olympics torch relay is located in Kagawa Prefecture
Kōchi	19 April 2021 (day 26): Kōchi to Sukumo: Kōchi; Ino; Tosa; Susaki; Yusuhara; Shimanto; Shimanto; Tosashimizu; Sukumo; 20 April 2021 (day 27): Nankoku to Kōchi: Nankoku; Kitagawa; Kami; Tano; Kōnan; Yasuda; Aki; Nahari; Muroto; Tōyō; Kōchi	2020 Summer Olympics torch relay is located in Kochi Prefecture
Ehime	21 April 2021 (day 28): Shikokuchūō to Matsuyama: Shikokuchūō; Kamijima; Niihama; Saijō; Imabari; Tōon; Masaki; Kumakōgen; Matsuyama; 22 April 2021 (day 29): Tobe to Yawatahama: Tobe; Ainan; Iyo; Uchiko; Ōzu; Matsuno; Kihoku; Seiyo; Uwajima; Ikata; Yawatahama	2020 Summer Olympics torch relay is located in Ehime Prefecture
Ōita	23 April 2021 (day 30): Beppu to Hita: Beppu; Hiji; Kitsuki; Kunisaki; Himeshima; Bungotakada; Usa; Nakatsu; Hita; 24 April 2021 (day 31): Kusu to Ōita: Kusu; Kokonoe; Yufu; Taketa; Saiki; Tsukumi; Usuki; Bungo-ōno; Ōita	2020 Summer Olympics torch relay is located in Oita Prefecture
Miyazaki	25 April 2021 (day 32): Takachiho to Miyazaki: Takachiho; Nobeoka; Hyūga; Takanabe; Saito; Miyazaki; 26 April 2021 (day 33): Miyazaki to Ebino: Miyazaki; Nichinan; Kushima; Mimata; Miyakonojō; Kobayashi; Ebino	2020 Summer Olympics torch relay is located in Miyazaki Prefecture
Kagoshima	27 April 2021 (day 34): Shibushi to Kagoshima: Shibushi; Kanoya; Amami; Minamiōsumi; Kirishima; Aira; Kagoshima; 28 April 2021 (day 35): Izumi to Ibusuki: Izumi; Nishinoomote; Satsumasendai; Hioki; Isa; Minamikyūshū; Ibusuki	2020 Summer Olympics torch relay is located in Kagoshima Prefecture
29–30 April 2021: Transport via ferry from Kyushu to Okinawa, Ryukyu Islands
Okinawa	1 May 2021 (day 36): Naha to Nago: Naha; Ginowan; Ishigaki; Okinawa; Uruma; Nago; Motobu; Nago; 2 May 2021 (day 37): Tomigusuku to Itoman: Tomigusuku; Urasoe; Zamami; Chatan; Miyakojima; Nanjō; Itoman	2020 Summer Olympics torch relay is located in Okinawa Prefecture
3–4 May 2021: Transport via ferry from Okinawa Island to Kyushu
Kumamoto	5 May 2021 (day 38): Hitoyoshi to Yatsushiro: Hitoyoshi; Minamata; Amakusa; Uto; Yatsushiro; 6 May 2021 (day 39): Mashiki to Kumamoto: Mashiki; Minamiaso; Aso; Kikuchi; Yamaga; Nagomi; Tamana; Kumamoto	2020 Summer Olympics torch relay is located in Kumamoto Prefecture
Nagasaki	7 May 2021 (day 40): Minamishimabara to Nagasaki: Minamishimabara; Shimabara; Unzen; Iki; Shin-Kamigotō; Isahaya; Ōmura; Nagasaki; 8 May 2021 (day 41): Nagayo to Sasebo: Nagayo; Togitsu; Saikai; Gotō; Tsushima; Matsuura; Hirado; Saza; Sasebo	2020 Summer Olympics torch relay is located in Nagasaki Prefecture
Saga	9 May 2021 (day 42): Tara to Karatsu: Tara; Kasima; Ureshino; Shiroishi; Takeo; Arita; Imari; Genkai; Karatsu; 10 May 2021 (day 43): Kiyama to Saga: Kiyama; Tosu; Miyaki; Yoshinogari; Kanzaki; Kamimine; Ogi; Taku; Ōmachi; Kōhoku; Saga	2020 Summer Olympics torch relay is located in Saga Prefecture
Fukuoka	11 May 2021 (day 44): Ōmuta to Fukuoka: Ōmuta; Chikugo; Itoshima; Kurume; Kasuga; Asakura; Tōhō; Dazaifu; Fukuoka; Shime; Fukuoka; 12 May 2021 (day 45): Chikujō to Kitakyushu: Chikujō; Tagawa; Soeda; Iizuka; Keisen; Miyawaka; Munakata; Nakama; Fukutsu; Kitakyushu	2020 Summer Olympics torch relay is located in Fukuoka Prefecture
Yamaguchi	13 May 2021 (day 46): Iwakuni to Yamaguchi: Iwakuni; Yanai; Hikari; Kudamatsu; Shūnan; Hōfu; Yamaguchi; 14 May 2021 (day 47): Ube to Hagi: Ube; San'yō-Onoda; Shimonoseki; Mine; Nagato; Hagi	2020 Summer Olympics torch relay is located in Yamaguchi Prefecture
Shimane	15 May 2021 (day 48): Tsuwano to Ōnan: Tsuwano; Chibu; Masuda; Hamada; Gōtsu; Kawamoto; Ōnan; 16 May 2021 (day 49): Ōda to Matsue: Ōda; Izumo; Unnan; Okuizumo; Okinoshima; Yasugi; Matsue	2020 Summer Olympics torch relay is located in Shimane Prefecture
Hiroshima	17 May 2021 (day 50): Miyoshi to Hiroshima: Miyoshi; Shōbara; Higashihiroshima; Kure; Saka; Hiroshima; 18 May 2021 (day 51): Hatsukaichi to Matsue: Hatsukaichi; Kaita; Mihara; Onomichi; Fuchū; Fukuyama	2020 Summer Olympics torch relay is located in Hiroshima Prefecture
Okayama	19 May 2021 (day 52): Ibara to Okayama: Ibara; Takahashi; Kibichūō; Sōja; Kurashiki; Okayama; 20 May 2021 (day 53): Tamano to Tsuyama: Tamano; Maniwa; Akaiwa; Mimasaka; Nagi; Tsuyama	2020 Summer Olympics torch relay is located in Okayama Prefecture
Tottori	21 May 2021 (day 54): Sakaiminato to Kurayoshi: Sakaiminato; Yonago; Hiezu; Nanbu; Nichinan; Hino; Kōfu; Hōki; Daisen; Kurayoshi; 22 May 2021 (day 55): Kotoura to Tottori: Kotoura; Hokuei; Misasa; Yurihama; Tottori; Iwami; Yazu; Chizu; Wakasa; Tottori	2020 Summer Olympics torch relay is located in Tottori Prefecture
Hyōgo	23 May 2021 (day 56): Toyooka to Himeji: Toyooka; Asago; Shisō; Katō; Ono; Kakogawa; Himeji; 24 May 2021 (day 57): Kobe to Tamba-Sasayama: Kobe; Akashi; Minamiawaji; Nishinomiya; Amagasaki; Sanda; Tamba-Sasayama	2020 Summer Olympics torch relay is located in Hyōgo Prefecture
Kyoto	25 May 2021 (day 58): Kyōtango to Kameoka: Kyōtango; Miyazu; Maizuru; Ayabe; Fukuchiyama; Nagaokakyō; Kameoka; 26 May 2021 (day 59): Uji to Kyoto: Uji; Ujitawara; Jōyō; Kizugawa; Seika; Kyōtanabe; Yawata; Kumiyama; Kyoto	2020 Summer Olympics torch relay is located in Kyoto Prefecture
Shiga	27 May 2021 (day 60): Takashima to Ōtsu: Takashima; Moriyama; Yasu; Ōmihachiman; Ryūō; Konan; Rittō; Kusatsu; Ōtsu; 28 May 2021 (day 61): Kōka to Nagahama: Kōka; Hino; Higashiōmi; Aishō; Toyosato; Kōra; Taga; Hikone; Maibara; Nagahama	2020 Summer Olympics torch relay is located in Shiga Prefecture
Fukui	29 May 2021 (day 62): Takashima to Minamiechizen: Takahama; Ōi; Obama; Wakasa; Mihama; Tsuruga; Minamiechizen; 30 May 2021 (day 63): Echizen to Fukui: Echizen; Sabae; Echizen; Ikeda; Ōno; Katsuyama; Eiheiji; Awara; Sakai; Fukui	2020 Summer Olympics torch relay is located in Fukui Prefecture
Ishikawa	31 May 2021 (day 64): Kaga to Kanazawa: Kaga; Komatsu; Nomi; Kawakita; Hakusan; Nonoichi; Uchinada; Kanazawa; Kahoku; Tsubata; Kanazawa; 1 June 2021 (day 65): Wajima to Nanao: Wajima; Noto; Anamizu; Suzu; Shika; Hakui; Hōdatsushimizu; Nakanoto; Nanao	2020 Summer Olympics torch relay is located in Ishikawa Prefecture
Toyama	2 June 2021 (day 66): Oyabe to Takaoka: Oyabe; Nanto; Tonami; Imizu; Takaoka; Himi; Takaoka; 3 June 2021 (day 67): Asahi to Toyama: Asahi; Nyūzen; Kurobe; Uozu; Namerikawa; Kamiichi; Funahashi; Tateyama; Toyama	2020 Summer Olympics torch relay is located in Toyama Prefecture
Niigata	4 June 2021 (day 68): Itoigawa to Minamiuonuma: Itoigawa; Jōetsu; Kashiwazaki; Sado; Tōkamachi; Minamiuonuma; 5 June 2021 (day 69): Nagaoka to Murakami: Nagaoka; Sanjō; Tsubame; Yahiko; Niigata; Shibata; Aga; Murakami	2020 Summer Olympics torch relay is located in Niigata Prefecture
Yamagata	6 June 2021 (day 70): Nishikawa to Yamagata: Nishikawa; Sagae; Kahoku; Shirataka; Nagai; Takahata; Yonezawa; Nan'yō; Kaminoyama; Yamagata; 7 June 2021 (day 71): Tendō to Sakata: Tendō; Higashine; Murayama; Obanazawa; Shinjō; Tsuruoka; Yuza; Sakata	2020 Summer Olympics torch relay is located in Yamagata Prefecture
Akita	8 June 2021 (day 72): Yuzawa to Yamagata: Yuzawa; Yokote; Yurihonjō; Misato; Daisen; Semboku; Akita; 9 June 2021 (day 73): Katagami to Kazuno: Katagami; Hachirōgata; Ōgata; Noshiro; Ōdate; Oga; Kazuno	2020 Summer Olympics torch relay is located in Akita Prefecture
Aomori	10 June 2021 (day 74): Hirosaki to Aomori: Hirosaki; Nishimeya; Hirakawa; Kuroishi; Tsugaru; Goshogawara; Imabetsu; Aomori; 11 June 2021 (day 75): Mutsu to Hachinohe: Mutsu; Towada; Misawa; Oirase; Hashikami; Towada; Hachinohe	2020 Summer Olympics torch relay is located in Aomori Prefecture
12 June 2021: Transport via ferry from Honshu to Hokkaido
Hokkaido	13 June 2021 (day 76): Hakodate to Shiraoi: Hakodate; Nemuro; Hokuto; Nanae; Kushiro; Tōyako; Obihiro; Muroran; Shiraoi; 14 June 2021 (day 77): Tomakomai to Sapporo: Tomakomai; Furano; Mukawa; Asahikawa; Atsuma; Abira; Tomakomai; Chitose; Sapporo; Wakkanai; Sapporo	2020 Summer Olympics torch relay is located in Hokkaido
15 June 2021: Transport via ferry from Hokkaido to Honshu
Iwate	16 June 2021 (day 78): Shizukuishi to Kuji: Shizukuishi; Takizawa; Hachimantai; Iwate; Ichinohe; Ninohe; Hirono; Fudai; Noda; Kuji; 17 June 2021 (day 79): Iwaizumi to Rikuzentakata: Iwaizumi; Tanohata; Miyako; Yamada; Ōtsuchi; Kamaishi; Ōfunato; Rikuzentakata; 18 June 2021 (day 80): Ichinoseki to Morioka: Ichinoseki; Hiraizumi; Ōshū; Kanegasaki; Kitakami; Hanamaki; Tōno; Shiwa; Yahaba; Morioka	2020 Summer Olympics torch relay is located in Iwate Prefecture
Miyagi	19 June 2021 (day 81): Kesennuma to Onagawa: Kesennuma; Minamisanriku; Ishinomaki; Onagawa; 20 June 2021 (day 82): Higashimatsushima to Rifu: Higashimatsushima; Ōhira; Matsushima; Shiogama; Shichigahama; Tagajō; Rifu; 21 June 2021 (day 83): Yamamoto to Sendai: Yamamoto; Watari; Iwanuma; Sendai; Natori; Sendai	2020 Summer Olympics torch relay is located in Miyagi Prefecture
22 June 2021: Transport via land route from Tōhoku to southeastern part of Japan
Shizuoka	23 June 2021 (day 84): Kosai to Shizuoka: Kosai; Hamamatsu; Iwata; Fukuroi; Kakegawa; Shimada; Shizuoka; 24 June 2021 (day 85): Makinohara to Numazu: Makinohara; Fujieda; Yaizu; Shizuoka; Fuji; Nagaizumi; Mishima; Numazu; 25 June 2021 (day 86): Itō to Fujinomiya: Itō; Shimoda; Izunokuni; Susono; Oyama; Gotemba; Izu; Fujinomiya	2020 Summer Olympics torch relay is located in Shizuoka Prefecture
Yamanashi	26 June 2021 (day 87): Nanbu to Kōfu: Nanbu; Minobu; Hayakawa; Fujikawa; Ichikawamisato; Chūō; Shōwa; Kai; Minami-Alps; Hokuto; Nirasaki; Kōfu; 27 June 2021 (day 88): Fuefuki to Fujiyoshida: Fuefuki; Yamanashi; Kōshū; Mount Fuji; Uenohara; Ōtsuki; Tsuru; Nishikatsura; Oshino; Fujikawaguchiko; Narusawa; Fujiyoshida	2020 Summer Olympics torch relay is located in Yamanashi Prefecture
Kanagawa	28 June 2021 (day 89): Hakone to Fujisawa: Hakone; Isehara; Odawara; Ōiso; Hiratsuka; Chigasaki; Fujisawa; 29 June 2021 (day 90): Miura to Sagamihara: Miura; Yokosuka; Kamakura; Ebina; Atsugi; Sagamihara; 30 June 2021 (day 91): Kawasaki to Yokohama: Kawasaki; Yokohama	2020 Summer Olympics torch relay is located in Kanagawa Prefecture
Chiba	1 July 2021 (day 92): Kisarazu to Sanmu: Kisarazu; Kimitsu; Futtsu; Minamibōsō; Isumi; Ichinomiya; Sōsa; Sanmu; 2 July 2021 (day 93): Chōshi to Chiba: Chōshi; Asahi; Katori; Shibayama; Narita; Narashino; Chiba; 3 July 2021 (day 94): Urayasu to Matsudo: Urayasu; Funabashi; Kamagaya; Kashiwa; Abiko; Kashiwa; Matsudo	2020 Summer Olympics torch relay is located in Chiba Prefecture
Ibaraki	4 July 2021 (day 95): Kashima to Mito: Kashima; Hitachinaka; Ōarai; Daigo; Hitachi; Hitachiōta; Kasama; Mito; 5 July 2021 (day 96): Koga to Tsukuba: Koga; Bandō; Jōsō; Ushiku; Ryūgasaki; Namegata; Tsuchiura; Tsukuba	2020 Summer Olympics torch relay is located in Ibaraki Prefecture
Saitama	6 July 2021 (day 97): Koga to Tokorozawa: Kawaguchi; Warabi; Toda; Wakō; Asaka; Niiza; Hidaka; Sayama; Fujimi; Fujimino; Miyoshi; Tokorozawa; 7 July 2021 (day 98): Sōka to Kumagaya: Sōka; Yashio; Misato; Yoshikawa; Koshigaya; Chichibu; Minano; Nagatoro; Kasukabe; Sugito; Miyashiro; Kuki; Kazo; Gyōda; Kumagaya; 8 July 2021 (day 99): Kawagoe to Saitama: Kawagoe; Tsurugashima; Sakado; Honjō; Fukaya; Ranzan; Higashimatsuyama; Namegawa; Kōnosu; Kitamoto; Okegawa; Ageo; Saitama	2020 Summer Olympics torch relay is located in Saitama Prefecture

=== Tokyo metropolitan leg ===

9 July 2021 (day 100)
1. Setagaya
2. Komae
3. Inagi
4. Machida
10 July 2021 (day 101)
5. Tama
6. Hino
7. Akishima
8. Hachiōji
11 July 2021 (day 102)
9. Hinohara
10. Okutama
11. Hinode
12. Ōme
13. Mizuho
12 July 2021 (day 103)
14. Hamura
15. Akiruno
16. Fussa
17. Musashimurayama
18. Tachikawa
13 July 2021 (day 104)
19. Kunitachi
20. Kokubunji
21. Kodaira
22. Higashiyamato
23. Higashimurayama
14 July 2021 (day 105)
24. Kiyose
25. Higashikurume
26. Nishitōkyō
27. Koganei
28. Fuchū

15 July 2021 (day 106)
29. Chōfu

16 July 2021 (day 107, continued)
39. Mitaka
40. Musashino

17 July 2021 (day 108)
41. Suginami
42. Nakano
43. Nerima

18 July 2021 (day 109)
44. Toshima
45. Itabashi
46. Kita
47. Adachi

19 July 2021 (day 110)
48. Katsushika
49. Edogawa
50. Sumida
51. Arakawa

20 July 2021 (day 111)
52. Taitō
53. Bunkyō
54. Chiyoda
55. Chūō

21 July 2021 (day 112)
56. Kōtō
57. Ōta
58. Shinagawa

22 July 2021 (day 113)
59. Meguro
60. Shibuya
61. Minato

23 July 2021 (day 114)
62. Shinjuku
63. New National Stadium

15 July 2021 (day 106, continued)
30. Miyake
31. Kōzushima
32. Niijima (Nii-jima and Shikine-jima)
33. To-shima
34. Ōshima
16 July 2021 (day 107)
35. Mikurajima
36. Hachijō
37. Aogashima
38. Ogasawara (Chichijima and Hahajima)

== Ceremony changes ==
Due to the ongoing COVID-19 pandemic and several prefectures declared state of emergency amid COVID-19 surge, many of the public stages of the relay were truncated to be more ceremonial rather than functional such as alternative events. Participants of the relay would carry the torch for about 30 meters before passing the flame to another participant rather than carrying it for long stretches.

For instance, the relay in Osaka prefecture was changed into a private relay without passing spectators at Expo Commemoration Park in Suita. The relay in Matsuyama, Ehime was cancelled and changed onto a private relay, while the rest of Ehime Prefecture still had their relays on public roads as planned. Later relays in prefectures affected by COVID-19 as the virus cases increased but changed into a ceremonial lighting ceremony onto the designated final destination.

== End of torch relay ==
In December 2018, organizers announced that, similar to what happened at the 2016 Summer Olympics, two cauldrons were built: one inside the Olympic Stadium and another on the waterfront, near the Dream Bridge. The function of the stadium cauldron was merely scenographic, to go according to what is established in the Olympic Charter. The Dream Bridge cauldron was placed where the flame will burn during the 16 days of the Games. It was lit right after the end of opening ceremony and will be extinguished a few moments before the closing ceremony starts, when the flame will return to the scenographic cauldron inside the stadium and will be burned for its last few moments. The decision to use a public cauldron came from the fact that it would not be possible to maintain the flame burning inside the stadium during the games.

At the 2020 Summer Olympics opening ceremony, the flame was transported to Japan National Stadium by judoka Tadahiro Nomura and wrestler Saori Yoshida, then the torch followed by the trio of baseball greats (Sadaharu Oh, Shigeo Nagashima and Hideki Matsui), until they passed to Hiroki Ohashi (大橋博樹 Ōhashi Hiroki) and Junko Kitagawa (北川順子 Kitagawa Junko), a doctor and a nurse helped to save lives during the pandemic as they carried the flame to Paralympian and wheelchair marathoner Wakako Tsuchida as passed to a group of students from Iwate, Miyagi and Fukushima Prefectures who were born before the Tōhoku earthquake and tsunami until they handed the torch to tennis player Naomi Osaka, who would go on to light the Olympic cauldron; during the Olympics, Osaka would compete for Japan in the women's tennis competition before being eliminated in the third round.
