= Aioi Shinrin Museum of Art =

- 相生森林美術館
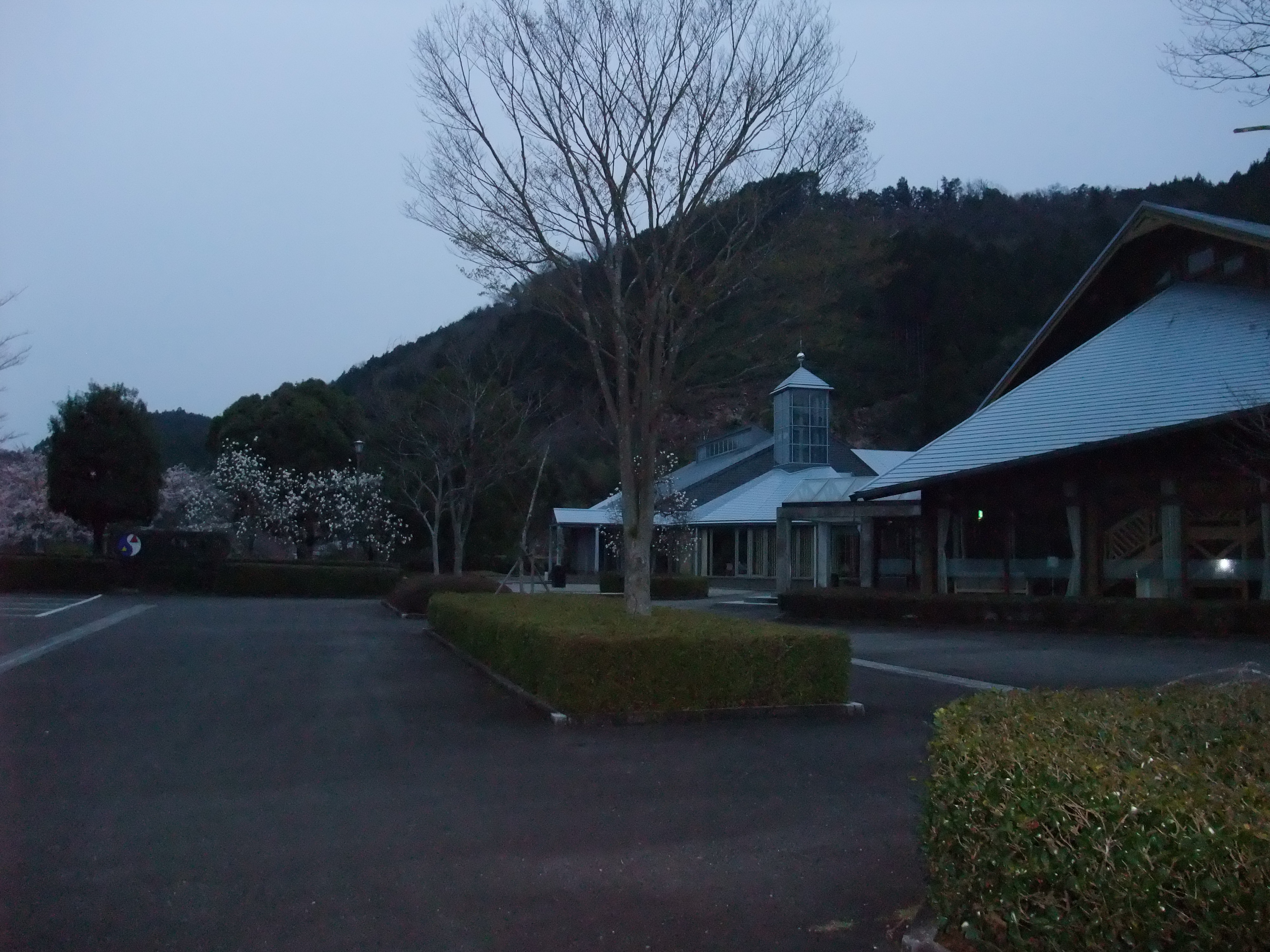
- Interactive map of the Aioi Shinrin Museum of Art area

General information
- Location: 34 Yokoishi Ōita, Naka, Tokushima Prefecture, Japan
- Coordinates: 33°47′53″N 134°27′07″E
- Opened: November 1993

Website
- Official website (ja)

Aioi Shinrin Museum of Art (相生森林美術館, Aioi Shinrin Bijutsukan) opened in Naka, Tokushima Prefecture, Japan, in 1993. The only town-operated art museum in the prefecture, the collection and displays relate to wood, in particular wood carvings and woodblock prints.

== See also ==
- Chūbu Sankei Prefectural Natural Park
- Higashi Sankei Prefectural Natural Park
