= Awa Province (Tokushima) =

Former province of Japan

Map of Japanese provinces (1868) with Awa Province (Tokushima) highlighted

Awa Province (阿波国, Awa no Kuni; Japanese pronunciation: [ä́.β̞ä̀ (nò̞ kɯ̈̀.ɲ̟ì)]) was a province of Japan in the area that is today Tokushima Prefecture on the island of Shikoku. Awa was bordered by Tosa, Sanuki, and Iyo Provinces. Its abbreviated form name was Ashū (阿州). In terms of the Gokishichidō system, Awa was one of the provinces of the Nankaidō circuit. Under the Engishiki classification system, Awa was ranked as one of the 35 "superior countries" (上国) in terms of importance, and one of the "middle countries" (中国) in terms of distance from the capital. The provincial capital was located in what is now the city of Tokushima.

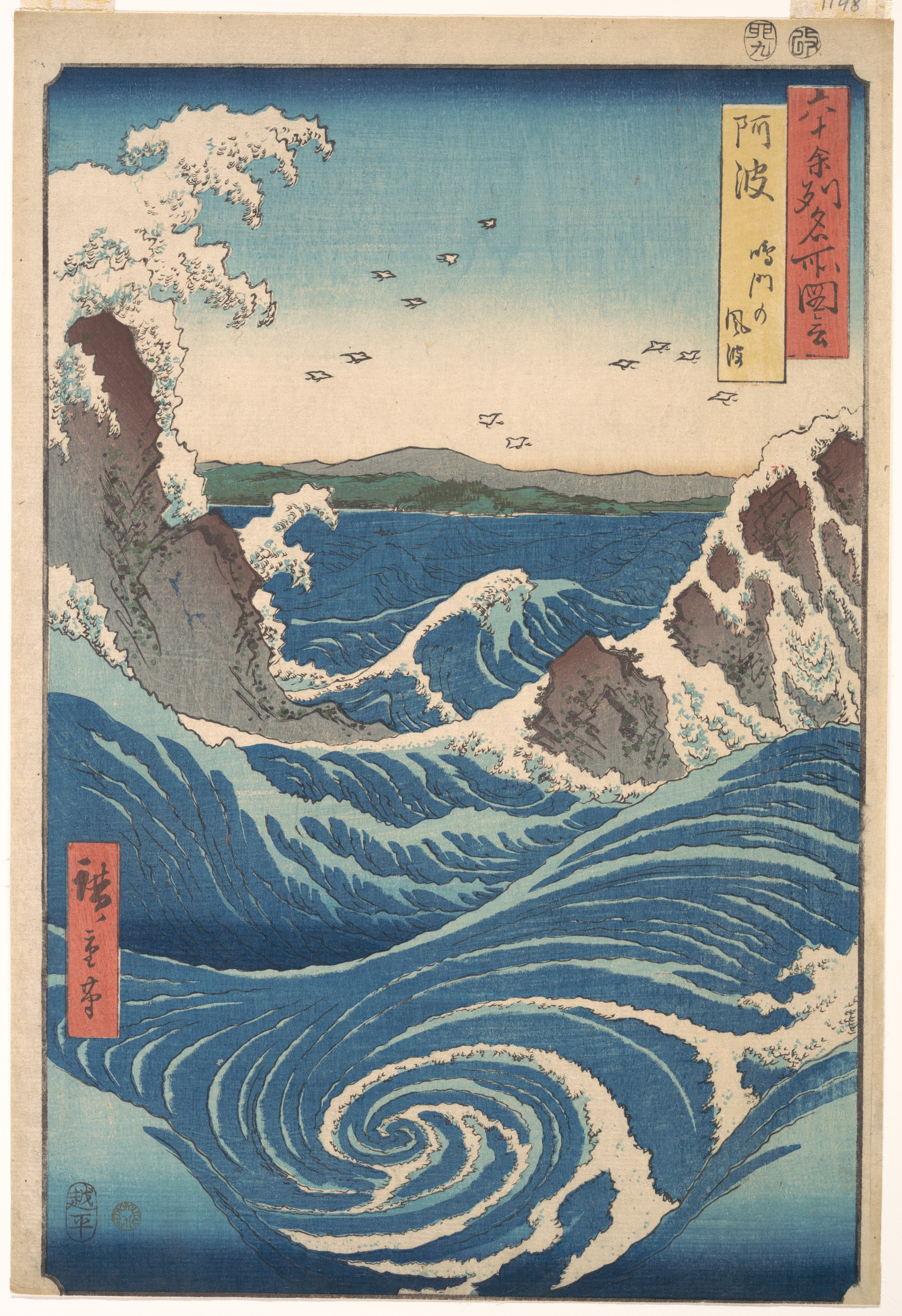
Hiroshige ukiyo-e "Awa" in "The Famous Scenes of the Sixty States" (六十余州名所図会), depicting the Naruto whirlpools

== History ==
Awa has been settled since the Japanese Paleolithic and the remains of Yayoi and Kofun period settlements and burial mounds have been found especially in the fertile Yoshino River valley. Per the Kogo Shūi, the name of the province was originally written "粟国" and was associated with the production of millet. Per the Kujiki, the kuni no miyatsuko of Awa was a ninth generation descendant of Takamimusubi who had been appointed by Emperor Ōjin. The name of the province was changed to "阿波" in 713 by Empress Genmei as rules for provincial names had been standardized under the Ritsuryō codes to consist of two kanji. During the Kamakura period, the Sasaki clan and the Ogasawara clan were shugo of the province. They were replaced by the Hosokawa clan during the Muromachi period; however, by the Sengoku period, the Hosokawa had been supplanted by the Miyoshi clan, who under Miyoshi Nagayoshi grew in power to rule over large portions of the Kinai region. When the Miyoshi clan became weakened by internal conflicts, the forces of Chōsokabe Motochika of Tosa Province invaded, and by 1585 was able to unify Shikoku under his rule. However, almost immediately, Hashiba Hideyoshi ordered his armies to invade. The Chōsokabe were defeated after two months and forced back to Tōsa. Awa Province was awarded to one of Hideyoshi's generals, Hachisuka Masakatsu, but he turned the province over to his son Hachisuka Iemasa due to his advanced age. Under the Tokugawa shogunate, the Hachisuka clan continued to rule Awa (and neighboring Awaji Province) from their stronghold at Tokushima Castle to the end of the Edo Period. Tokushima Domain had a nominal kokudaka of 257,000 koku, making it the 17th largest domain. Following the Meiji restoration and the abolition of the han system in 1871, Awa became "Myōdō Prefecture" (名東県), which was merged into Kagawa Prefecture. In 1875, the former Sanuki Province was separated out, and in 1876, former Awaji Province was assigned to Hyōgo Prefecture. The former Awa Province was merged with Kōchi Prefecture. In 1880, the former Awa Province was separated from Kōchi to become Tokushima Prefecture. Per the early Meiji period Kyudaka kyuryo Torishirabe-chō (旧高旧領取調帳), an official government assessment of the nation’s resources, the province had 584 villages with a total kokudaka of 306,632 koku.

Bakumatsu period domains
Name	Clan	Type	kokudaka
Tokushima	Hachisuka clan	Tozama	257,000 koku

Districts of Awa Province
District	kokudaka	Controlled by	at present	Currently
Awa District (阿波郡)	12,667 koku	31 villages	dissolved	Awa, small part of Yoshinogawa
Itano District (板野郡)	61,892 koku	133 villages		Naruto, Kitajima, Aizumi, Itano, most of Kamiita, parts of Tokushima, Yoshinogawa, Awa
Kaifu District (海部郡)	18,450 koku	64 villages		Mugi, Tokushima, Minami, Tokushima, Kaiyō.
Katsuura District (勝浦郡)	34,237 koku	46 villages		Katsuura, Kamikatsu, most of Komatsushima, part of Tokushima
Mima District (美馬郡)	10,735 koku	19 villages		Tsurugi, most of Mima, part of Miyoshi
Miyoshi District (三好郡)	22,985 koku	32 villages		Higashimiyoshi, part of Miyoshi
Myōdō District (名東郡)	38,491 koku	55 villages		Sanagōchi, part of Tokushima
Myōzai District (名西郡)	28,718 koku	38 villages		Ishii, Kamiyama, parts of Tokushima, Kamiita
Naka District (那賀郡)	60,736 koku	137 villages		Naka, Anan, parts of Komatsushima
Ōe District (麻植郡)	17,715 koku	29 villages	dissolved	Most of Yoshinogawa, part of Mima

== Gallery ==
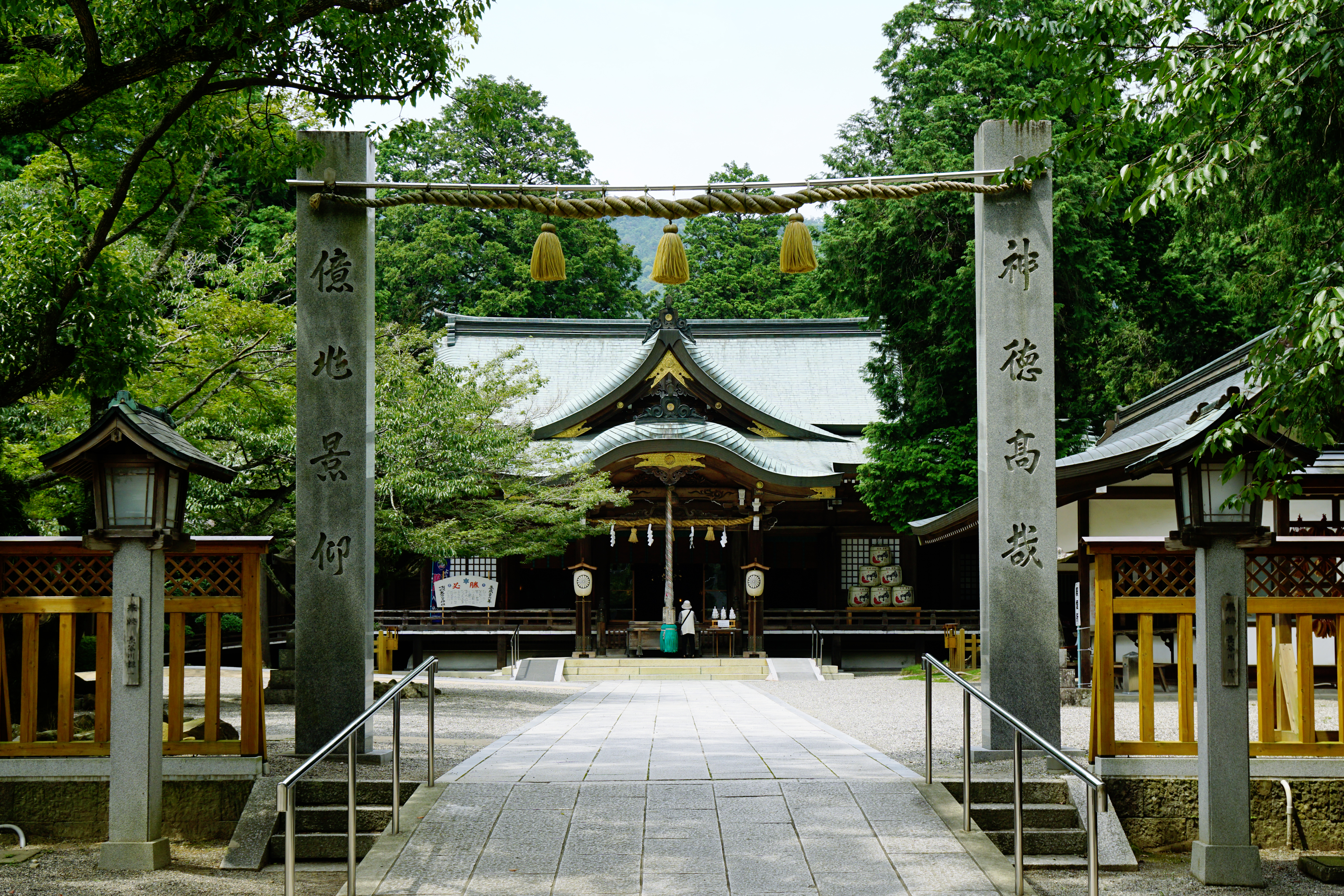
Oasahiko Jinja, one of the ichinomiya of the province

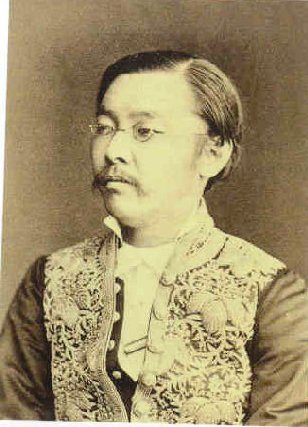
Hachisuka Mochiake, last daimyō of Tokushima

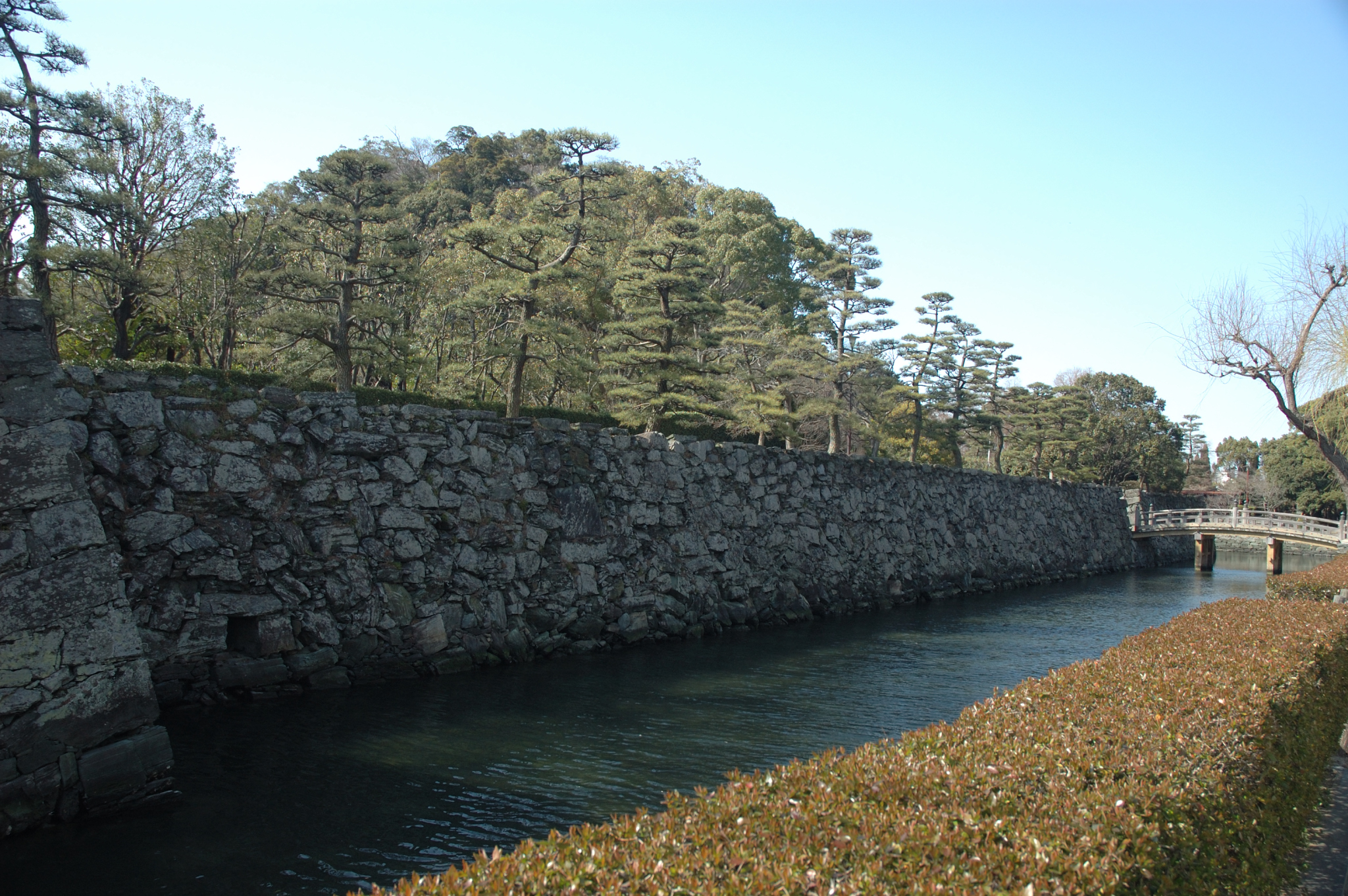
Walls of Tokushima Castle

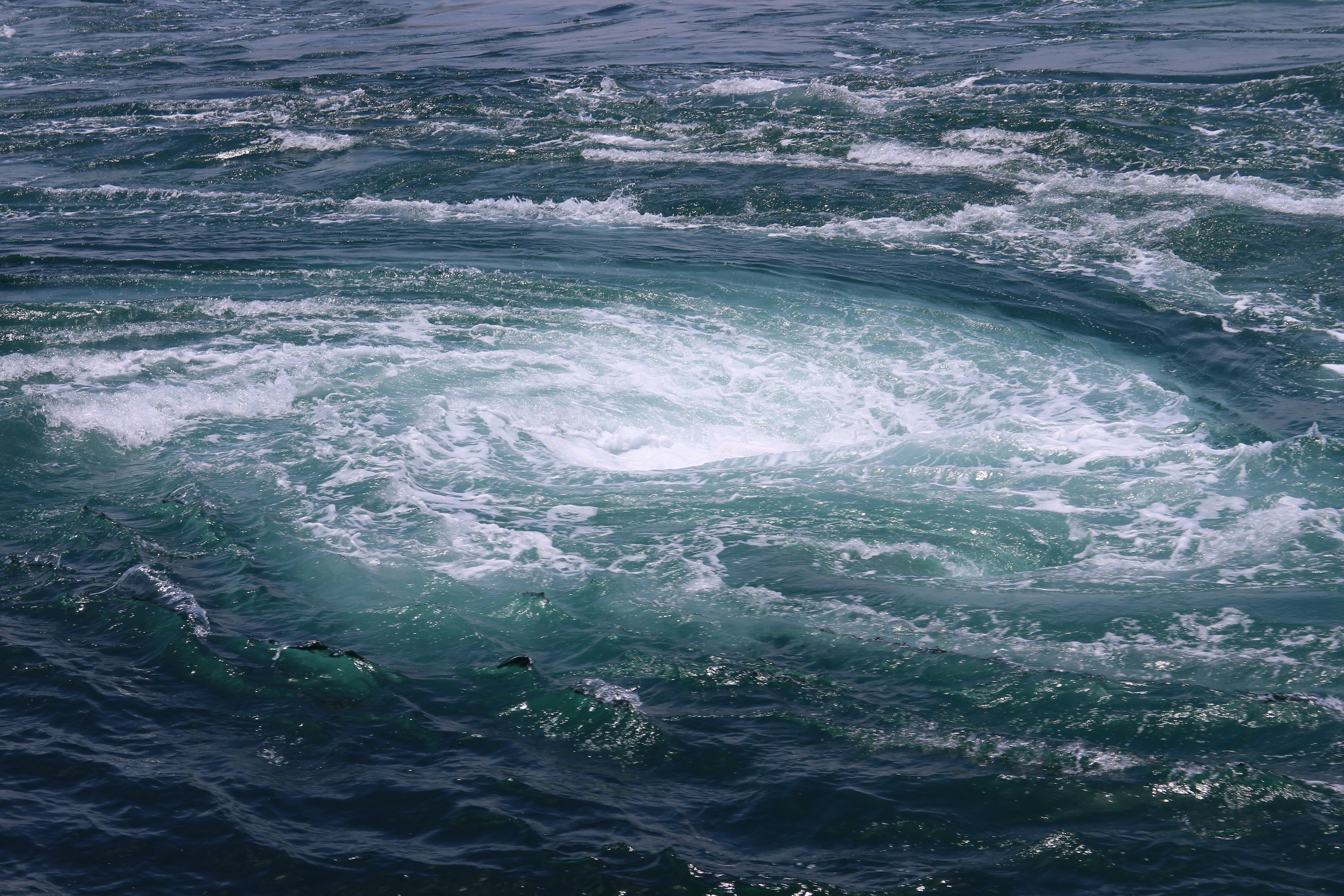
Naruto whirlpools
