= Katsuura =

Katsuura may refer to:

- Katsuura, Chiba, a city in Chiba Prefecture
- Katsuura, Tokushima, a town in Tokushima Prefecture
