= Kamikatsu, Tokushima =

Kamikatsu 上勝町
- Town
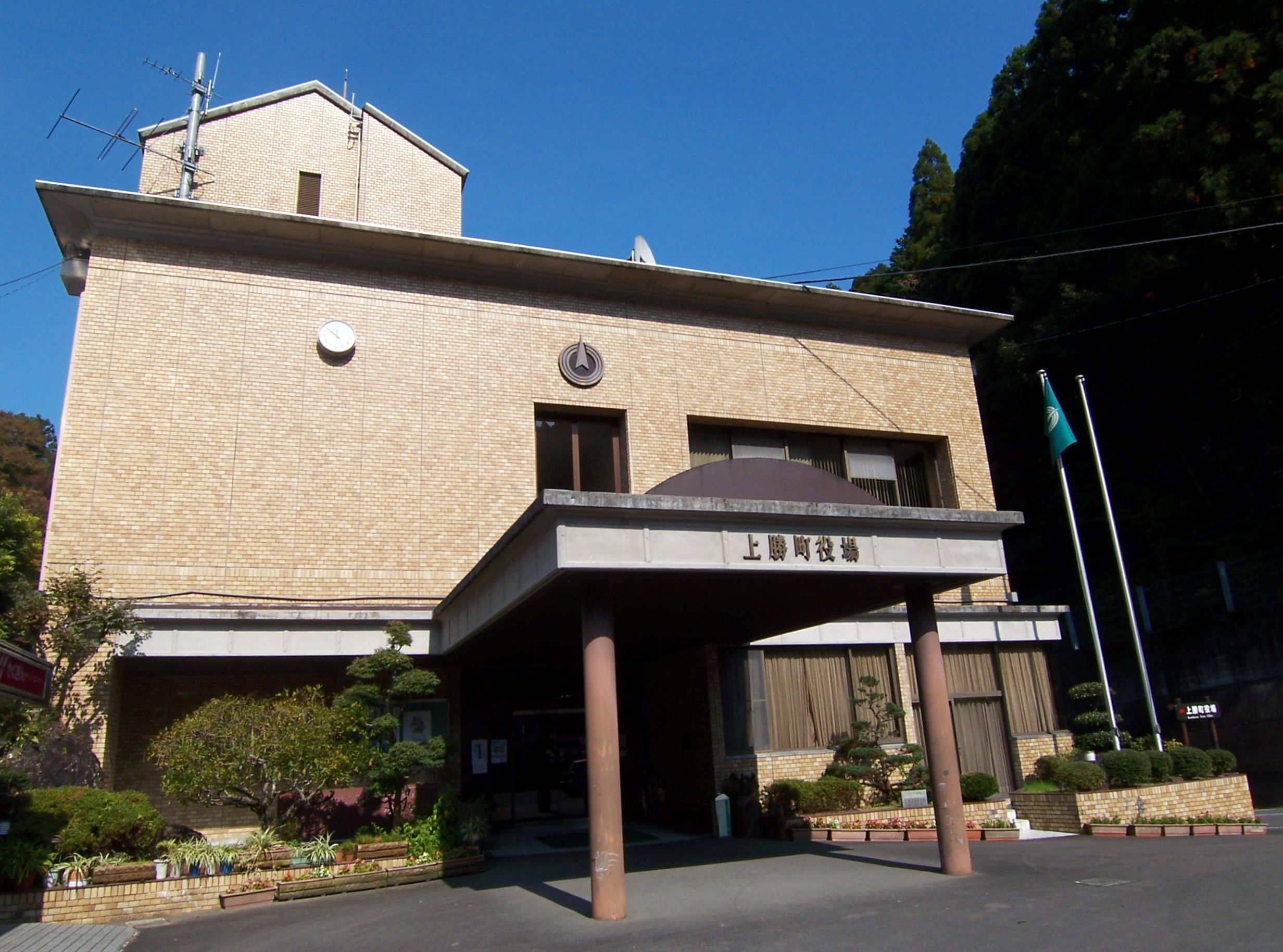
- Kamikatsu town office

- Flag Emblem
- Interactive map of Kamikatsu
- Location in Japan
- Coordinates: 33°53′N 134°24′E
- Country: Japan
- Region: Shikoku
- Prefecture: Tokushima
- District: Katsuura

Area
  - Total: 109.63 km^{2} (42.33 sq mi)

Population (June 1, 2022)
  - Total: 1,431
  - Density: 13.05/km^{2} (33.81/sq mi)
- Time zone: UTC+09:00 (JST)
- City hall address: 3-1 Shimoyokomine, Fukuhara, Kamikatsu-cho, Katsuura-gun, Tokushima-ken 771-4501
- Website: Official website
- Symbols
- Bird: Grey wagtail
- Flower: Gentiana scabra
- Tree: Taxus cuspidata

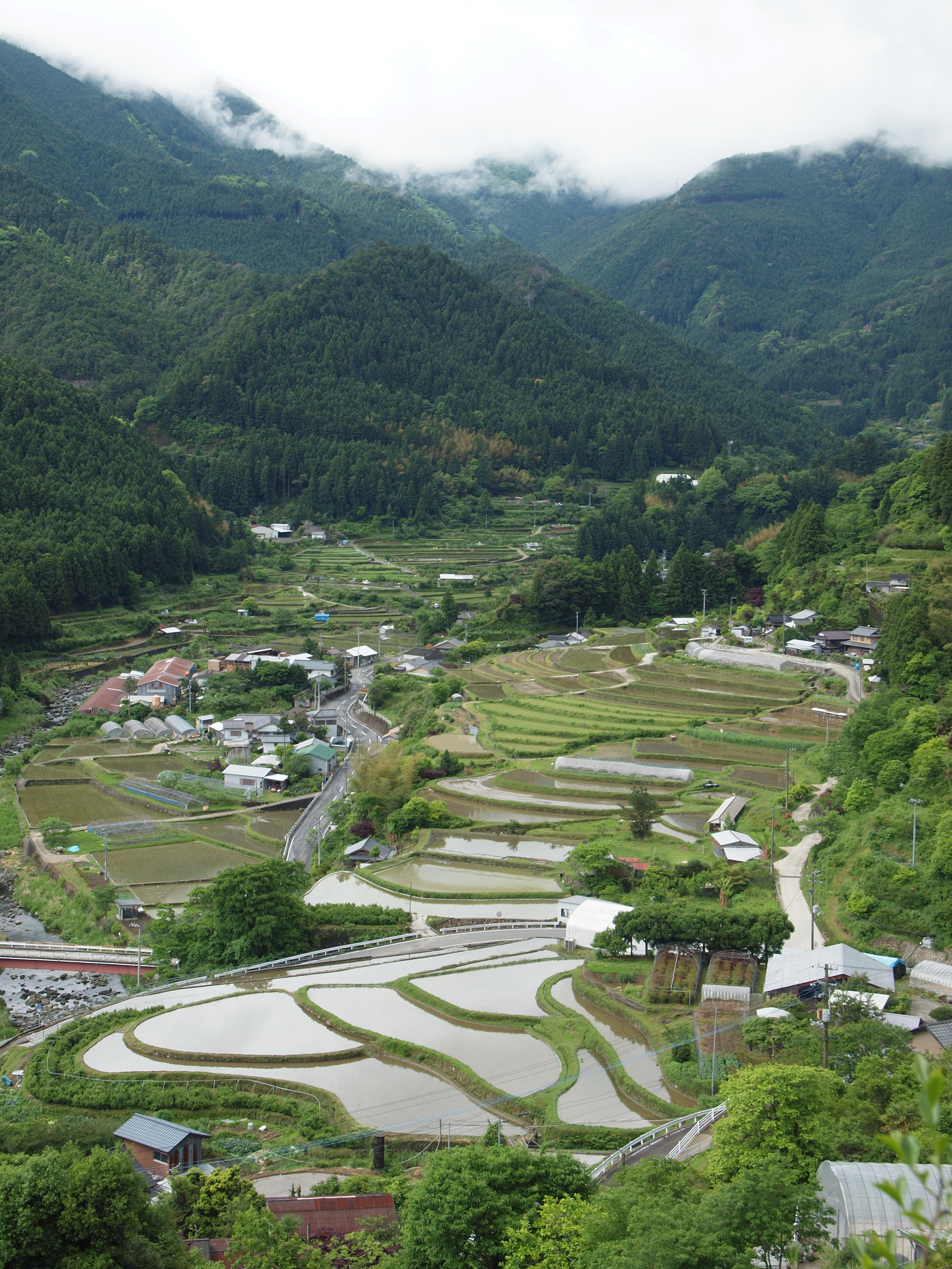
Rice Terraces in Kamikatsu

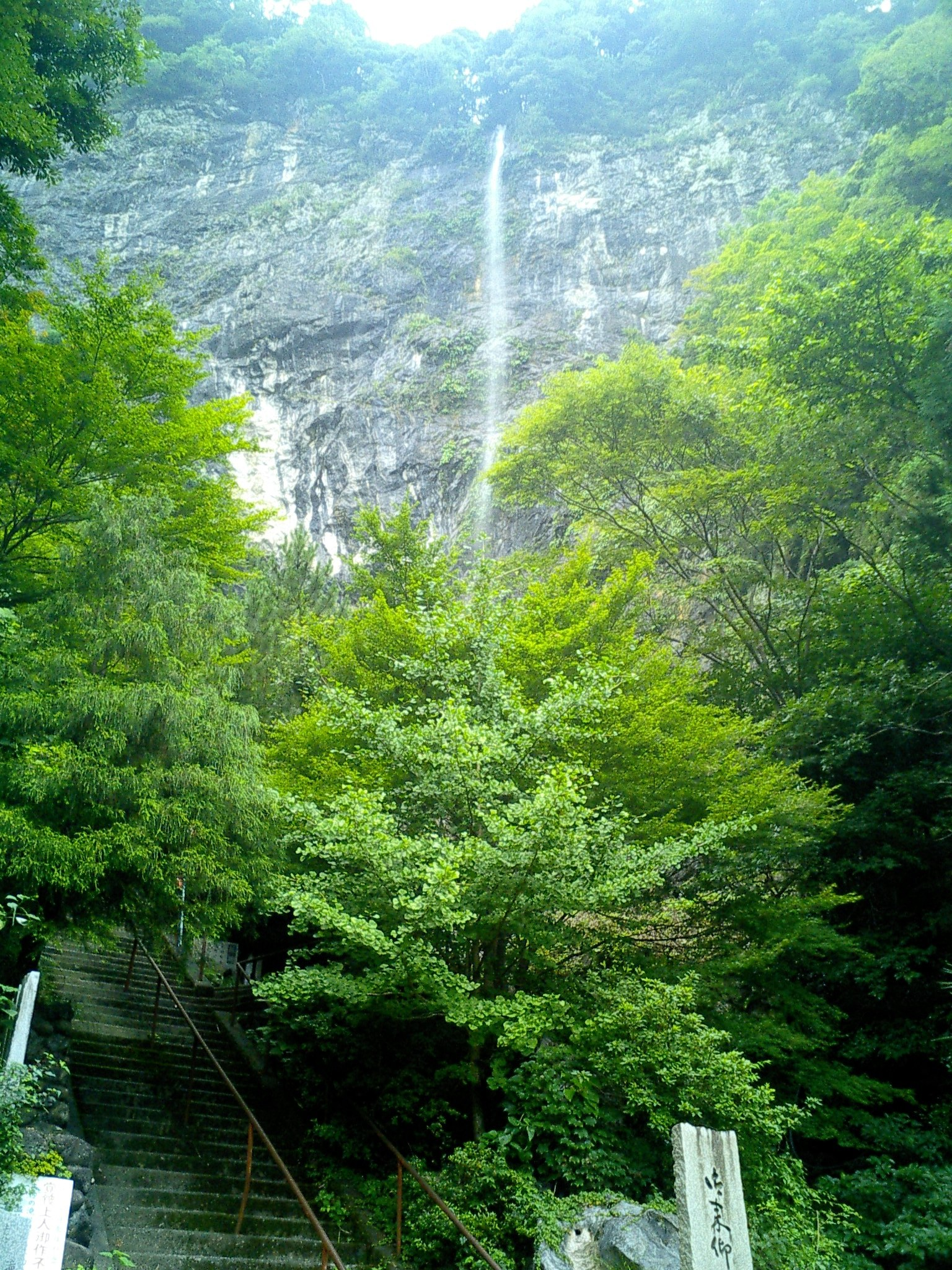
Kanjo Waterfall at Jigen-ji temple

Kamikatsu (上勝町, Kamikatsu-chō) is a town located in Katsuura District, Tokushima Prefecture, Japan. As of 1 June 2022, the town had an estimated population of 1,431 in 750 households and a population density of 13 persons per km^{2}. The total area of the town is 69.85 square kilometres (26.97 sq mi). It is the least populated of the towns of Shikoku.

== Geography ==
Kamikatsu is located in central Tokushima prefecture on the island of Shikoku. It is located in a mountainous area the upper reaches of the Katsuura River. Parts of the town are within the borders of the Chūbu Sankei Prefectural Natural Park.

=== Neighbouring municipalities ===
Tokushima Prefecture

- Kamiyama
- Katsuura
- Naka
- Sanagōchi

=== Climate ===
Kamikatsu has a humid subtropical climate (Köppen Cfa) characterized by warm summers and cool winters with light snowfall. The average annual temperature in Kamikatsu is 13.6 °C. The average annual rainfall is 2128 mm with September as the wettest month. The temperatures are highest on average in August, at around 24.2 °C, and lowest in January, at around 3.0 °C.

== Demographics ==
Per Japanese census data, the population of Kamikatsu has been declining for the past 70 years.

Historical population
Year	Pop.	±%
1920	5,172	—
1930	5,139	−0.6%
1940	5,276	+2.7%
1950	6,356	+20.5%
1960	5,915	−6.9%
1970	4,057	−31.4%
1980	2,918	−28.1%
1990	2,450	−16.0%
2000	2,124	−13.3%
2010	1,783	−16.1%
2020	1,380	−22.6%

== History ==
As with all of Tokushima Prefecture, the area of Kamikatsu was part of ancient Awa Province. During the Edo period, the area was part of the holdings of Tokushima Domain ruled by the Hachisuka clan from their seat at Tokushima Castle. The villages of Takahoko (高鉾村) and Fukuhara (福原村) established within Katsuura District, Tokushima with the creation of the modern municipalities system on October 1, 1889. The two villages merged on July 20, 1955, to form the town of Kamikatsu.

== Government ==
Kamikatsu has a mayor-council form of government with a directly elected mayor and a unicameral town council of eight members. Kamikatsu, together the city of Komatsushima and town of Katsuura, contributes three members to the Tokushima Prefectural Assembly. In terms of national politics, the town is part of Tokushima 1st district of the lower house of the Diet of Japan.

== Economy ==
The economy of Kamikatsu is agricultural, and the town is noted for its rice terraces.

Kamikatsu is a "zero waste" town; all household waste is separated into 45 different categories and sent to be recycled at the Kamikatsu Zero Waste Center. In 2008, a poll showed that 40% of residents were still unhappy about the aspect of the policy that required items to be washed. But the town continues the policy as it is cheaper and more environmentally friendly than purchasing an incinerator. The Town recycles about 80% of its waste, compared to 20% in the rest of Japan, which is still relatively high compared to the USA at 9% and the Philippines at less than 5%, according to a Rappler article.. The town has set a goal to become fully zero waste by 2020.

== Education ==
Kamikatsu has one public elementary school and one public middle school operated by the town government. The town does not have a high school.

== Transportation ==
=== Railway ===
Kamikatsu does not have any passenger rail service. The closest station is Minami-Komatsushima Station on the JR Shikoku Mugi Line.

=== Highways ===
Kamikatsu is not on any national highway or expressway.

== Local attractions ==
- Chūbu Sankei Prefectural Natural Park
