= Higashi Sankei Prefectural Natural Park =

Natural park of Tokushima prefecture, Japan

- 東山渓県立自然公園
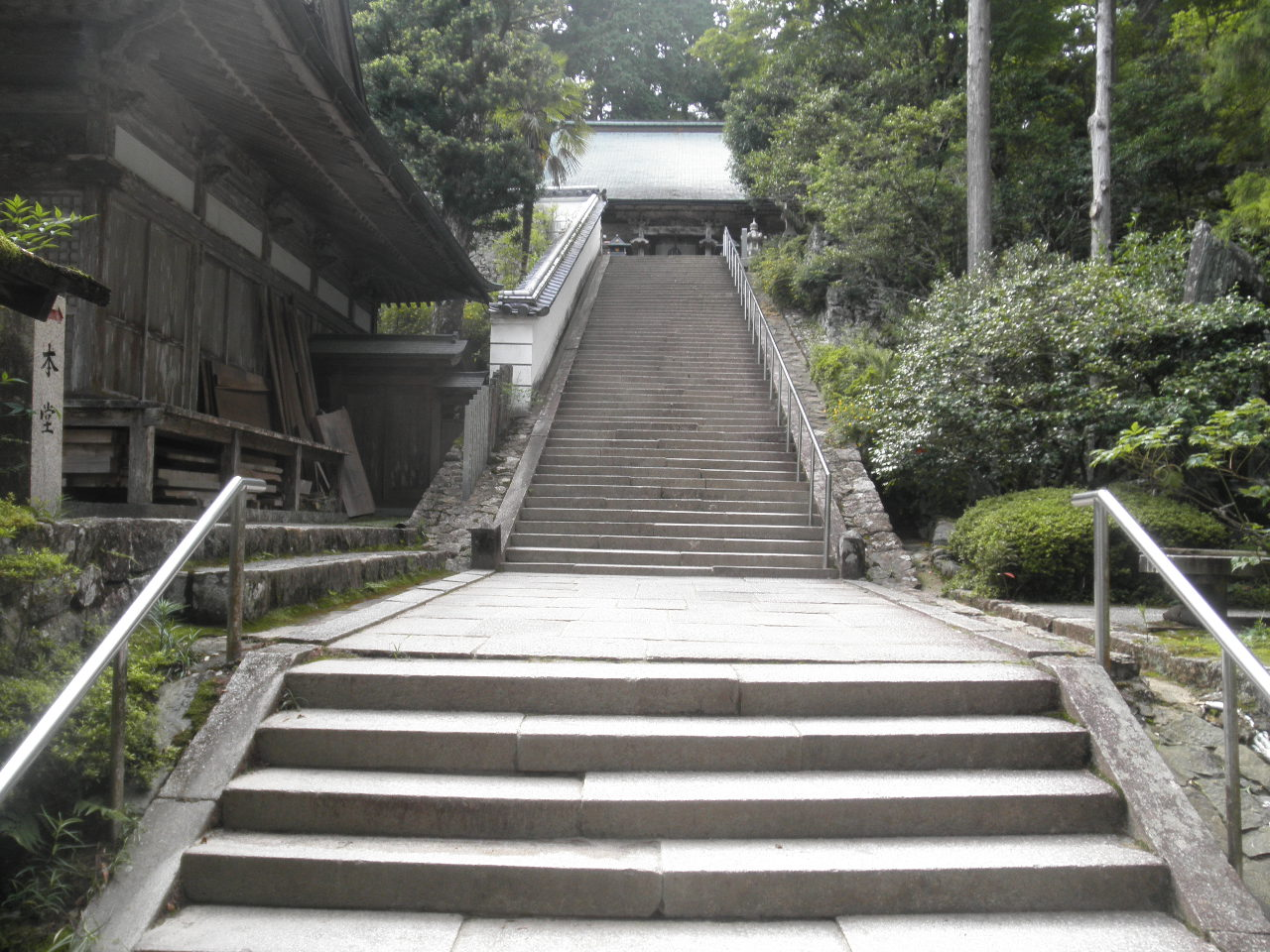
- Approach to Kakurin-ji

- Location within Tokushima Prefecture Location within Japan
- Location: Tokushima Prefecture, Japan
- Coordinates: 33.97°N 134.5°E
- Area: 44.32 km^{2} (17.11 sq mi)
- Established: 1 April 2005

Higashi Sankei Prefectural Natural Park (東山渓県立自然公園, Higashi Sankei kenritsu shizen kōen) is a Prefectural Natural Park in Tokushima Prefecture, Japan. Established in 2005, the park spans the borders of the municipalities of Kamiyama, Katsuura, Naka, Sanagōchi, and Tokushima. The park encompasses Mount Nakatsumine (中津峰山) and the Hata Five Falls (八多五滝) as well as the temples of Kakurin-ji (鶴林寺) and Tairyū-ji (太龍寺), temples 20 and 21 on the Shikoku pilgrimage.

== See also ==
- National Parks of Japan
