= Kamiyama, Tokushima =

Kamiyama 神山町
- Town
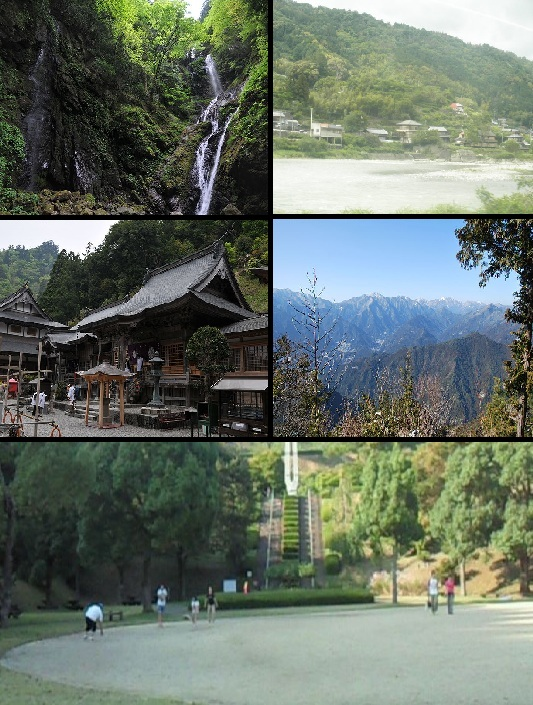
- Clockwise from upper left: Amagoi Fall, Akui River, view of Mount Tsurugi from Shōsan Temple, square in Kamiyama Forest Park, Shōsan Temple

- Flag Emblem
- Interactive map of Kamiyama
- Location in Japan
- Coordinates: 33°58′2″N 134°21′1.8″E
- Country: Japan
- Region: Shikoku
- Prefecture: Tokushima
- District: Myōzai

Government
  - Mayor: Masakazu Goto (since June 2005)

Area
  - Total: 173.30 km^{2} (66.91 sq mi)

Population (June 30, 2022)
  - Total: 4,930
  - Density: 28.4/km^{2} (73.7/sq mi)
- Time zone: UTC+09:00 (JST)
- City hall address: 100 Jinjyō-ji Honnoma, Kamiyama-chō, Myōzai-gun, Tokushima-ken 771-3395
- Website: Official website
- Symbols
- Bird: Copper pheasant
- Flower: Prunus mume
- Tree: Cryptomeria

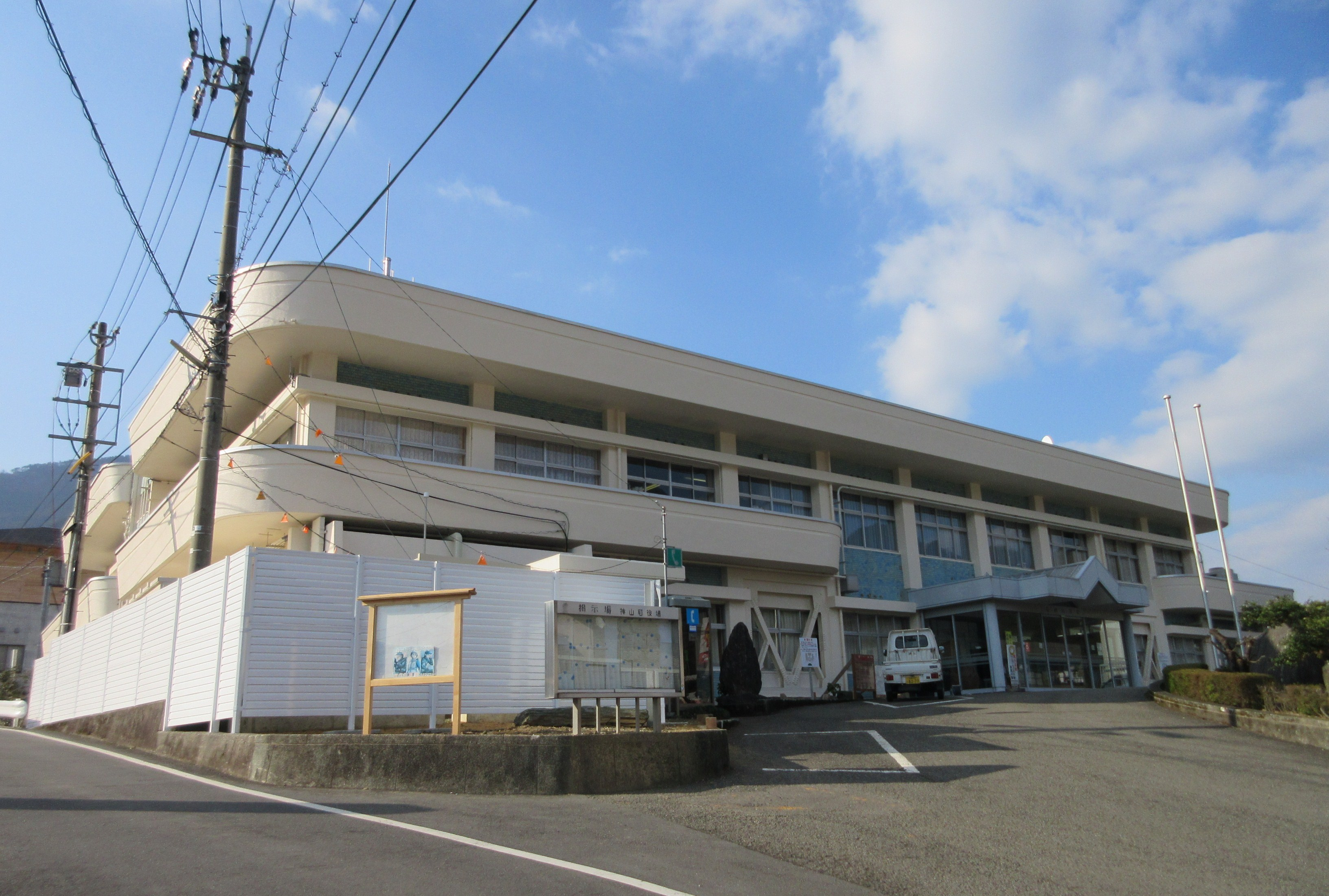
Kamiyama Town Hall

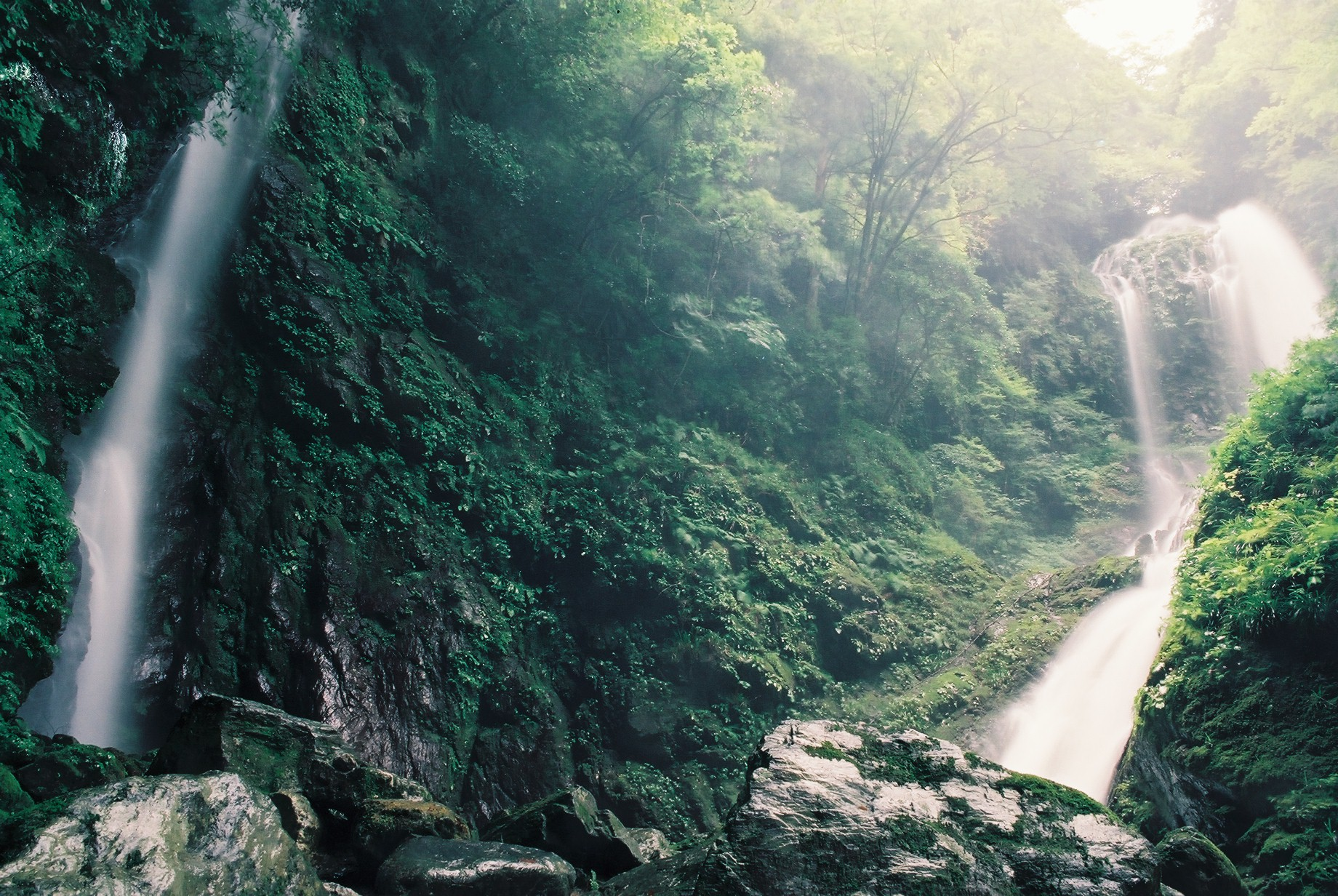
Amagoi Falls

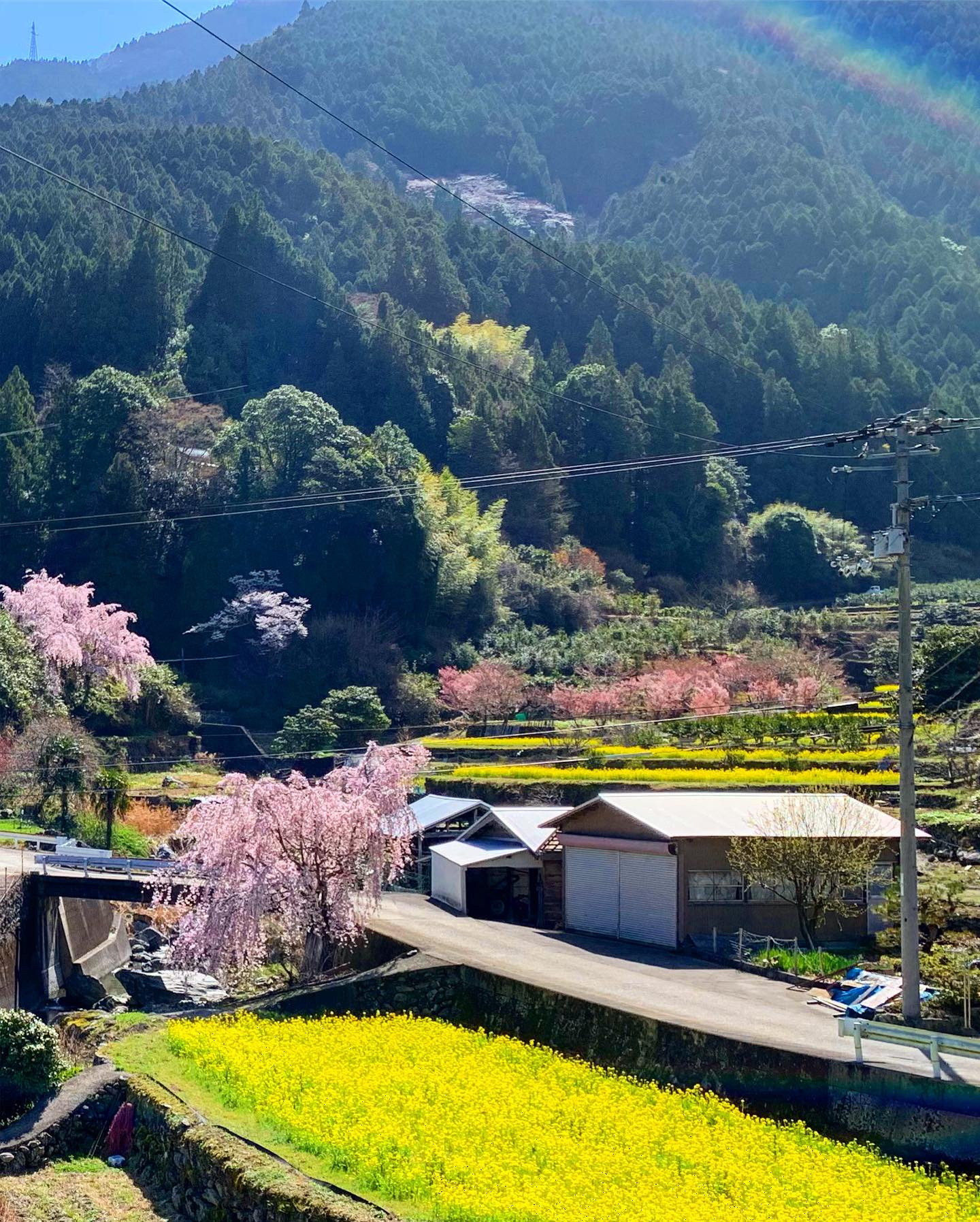
Spring in Kamiyama

Kamiyama (神山町, Kamiyama-chō) is a town in Myōzai District, Tokushima Prefecture, Japan. As of 30 June 2022, the town had an estimated population of 4,930 in 2024 households and a population density of 28 persons per km^{2}. The total area of the town is 173.305 square kilometres (66.913 sq mi).

== Geography ==
Kamiyama is located in the upper reaches of the Akui River, which runs parallel to the south side of the Yoshino River in central Tokushima Prefecture on the island of Shikoku. Located in the eastern part of the Shikoku Mountains, about 83% of the total area is mountainous, with agricultural land and settlements scattered in the Akui River basin that crosses the center of the town from east to west. Parts of the town are within the borders of the Chūbu Sankei Prefectural Natural Park or the Higashi Sankei Prefectural Natural Park.

=== Neighbouring municipalities ===
Tokushima Prefecture

- Ishii
- Kamikatsu
- Mima
- Naka
- Sanagōchi
- Tokushima
- Yoshinogawa

=== Climate ===
Kamiyama has a humid subtropical climate (Köppen Cfa) characterized by warm summers and cool winters with light snowfall. The average annual temperature in Kamiyama is 14.5 °C. The average annual rainfall is 2137 mm with September as the wettest month. The temperatures are highest on average in August, at around 25.4 °C, and lowest in January, at around 3.9 °C.

== Demographics ==
Per Japanese census data, the population of Kamiyama has been rapidly declining over the past 70 years.

Historical population
Year	Pop.	±%
1920	17,713	—
1930	18,135	+2.4%
1940	17,979	−0.9%
1950	21,241	+18.1%
1960	18,503	−12.9%
1970	13,588	−26.6%
1980	11,156	−17.9%
1990	9,468	−15.1%
2000	7,798	−17.6%
2010	6,038	−22.6%
2020	4,647	−23.0%

== History ==
As with all of Tokushima Prefecture, the area of Kamiyama was part of ancient Awa Province. The area has been settled since ancient times and is mentioned in the Nihon Shoki. During the Edo period, the area was part of the holdings of Tokushima Domain ruled by the Hachisuka clan from their seat at Tokushima Castle. The villages of Ano (阿野村), Jinryō (神領村), Orono (鬼籠野村), Shimobun-Kamiyama (下分上山村), and Kamibun-Kamiyama (上分上山村) were established within Myōzai District, Tokushima with the creation of the modern municipalities system on October 1, 1889. These five villages merged to form the town of Kamiyama on November 20, 1965.

== Government ==
Kamiyama has a mayor-council form of government with a directly elected mayor and a unicameral town council of eight members. Kamiyama, together with the other municipalities of Myōzai District, contributes two members to the Tokushima Prefectural Assembly. In terms of national politics, the town is part of Tokushima 1st district of the lower house of the Diet of Japan.

== Economy ==
The economy of Kamiyama is agricultural, and the town is the largest producer of sudachi in Japan, accounting for 24% of the production in Tokushima Prefecture. Kamiyama is notable for its successes in minimizing its population decline through digital transformation efforts and promotion as a rural startup ecosystem.

== Education ==
Kamiyama has two public elementary schools and one public middle school operated by the town government and one public high school operated by the Tokushima Prefectural Department of Education.

== Transportation ==
=== Railway ===
Kamiyama does not have any passenger rail service. The closest station is the JR Shikoku Tokushima Station, which is approximately 50 minutes away by car.

=== Highways ===
- National Route 193
- National Route 438
- National Route 439

== Local attractions ==
- Amagoi Waterfalls, one of "Japan’s Top 100 Waterfalls",
- Chūbu Sankei Prefectural Natural Park
- Higashi Sankei Prefectural Natural Park
- Kamiichinomiya Ōawa Jinja, one of the shrines claiming to be the ichinomiya of Awa Province.
- Okubo Chichi-Icho Ginkgo tree
- Shōsan-ji, 12th temple on the Shikoku Pilgrimage
