= Chūbu Sankei Prefectural Natural Park =

Park in Tokushima Prefecture, Japan

- 中部山渓県立自然公園
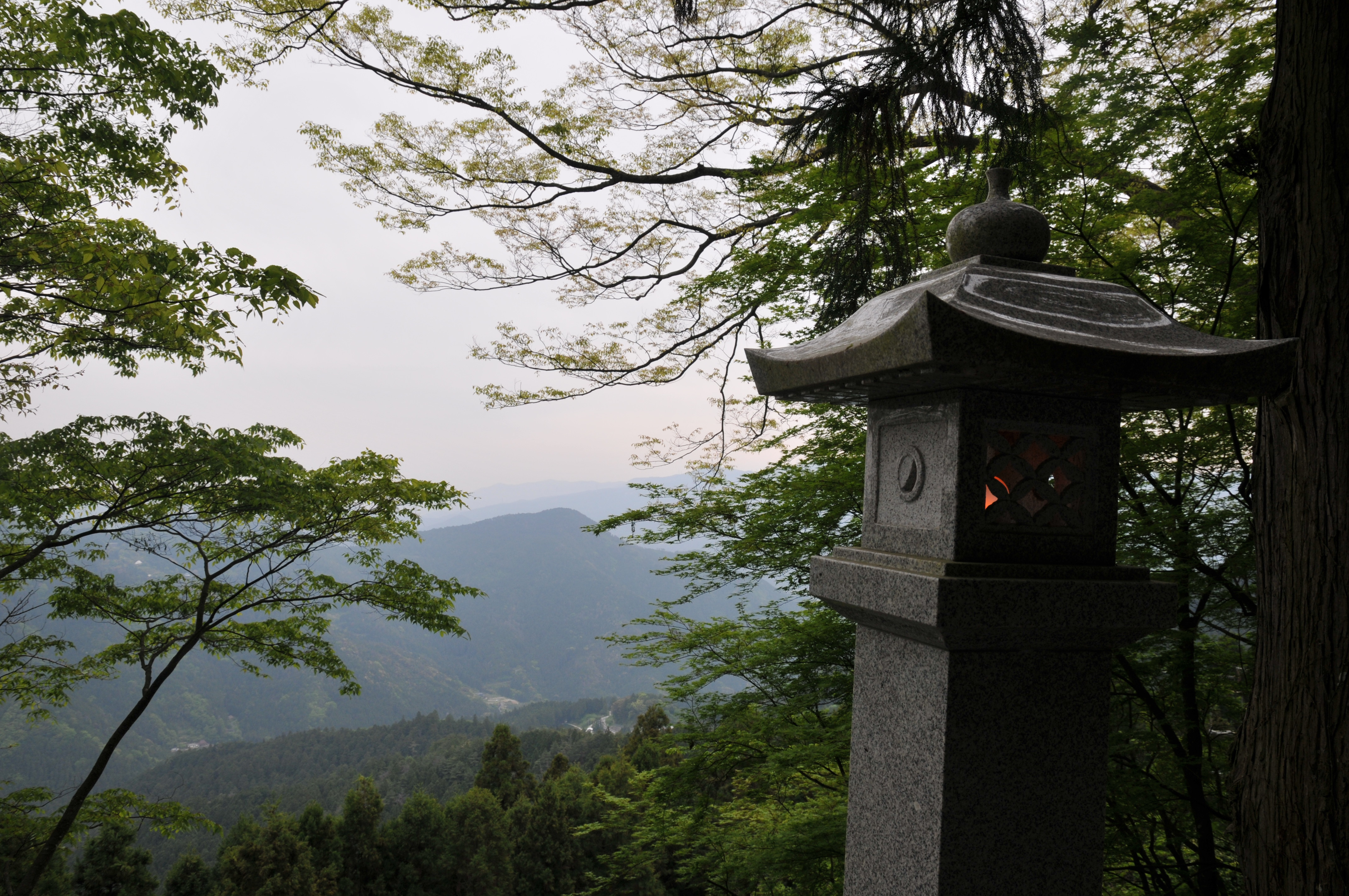
- View from Shōsan-ji
- Interactive map of Chūbu Sankei Prefectural Natural Park
- Location: Tokushima Prefecture, Japan
- Area: 55.80 km^{2} (21.54 sq mi)
- Established: 3 March 2006

Chūbu Sankei Prefectural Natural Park (中部山渓県立自然公園, Chūbu Sankei kenritsu shizen kōen) is a Prefectural Natural Park in central Tokushima Prefecture, Japan. Established in 2006, the park spans the borders of the municipalities of Kaiyō, Kamikatsu, Kamiyama, and Naka. Within the park is the temple of Shōsan-ji (焼山寺), temple 12 on the Shikoku pilgrimage.

== See also ==
- National Parks of Japan
