= Myōdō District, Tokushima =

District in Tokushima Prefecture, Japan

Coordinates: 33.9895°N 134.455°E

Location in Tokushima Prefecture See SVG File with names

Myōdō (名東郡, Myōdō-gun) is a district located in Tokushima Prefecture, Japan.

As of June 1, 2019, the district has an estimated population of 2,144 and a density of 49.8 inhabitants per square kilometer (129/sq mi). The total area is 42.28 km^{2} (16.32 sq mi).

== Towns and villages ==
- Sanagōchi
