= Katsuura, Tokushima =

Katsuura 勝浦町
- Town
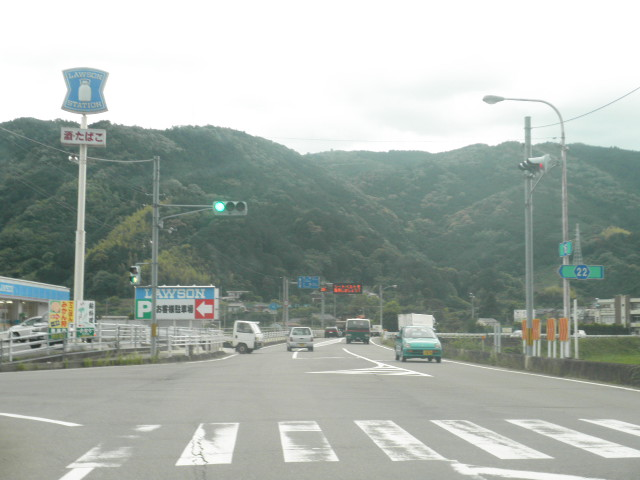
- Katsuura town

- Flag Emblem
- Interactive map of Katsuura
- Location in Japan
- Coordinates: 33°56′N 134°31′E
- Country: Japan
- Region: Shikoku
- Prefecture: Tokushima
- District: Katsuura

Government
  - Mayor: Takenori Nogami

Area
  - Total: 69.85 km^{2} (26.97 sq mi)

Population (June 30, 2022)
  - Total: 4,884
  - Density: 69.92/km^{2} (181.1/sq mi)
- Time zone: UTC+09:00 (JST)
- City hall address: 3 Kubota, Katsuura-cho, Katsuura-gun, Tokushima-ken 771-4305
- Website: Official website
- Symbols
- Flower: Cosmos
- Tree: Citrus unshiu

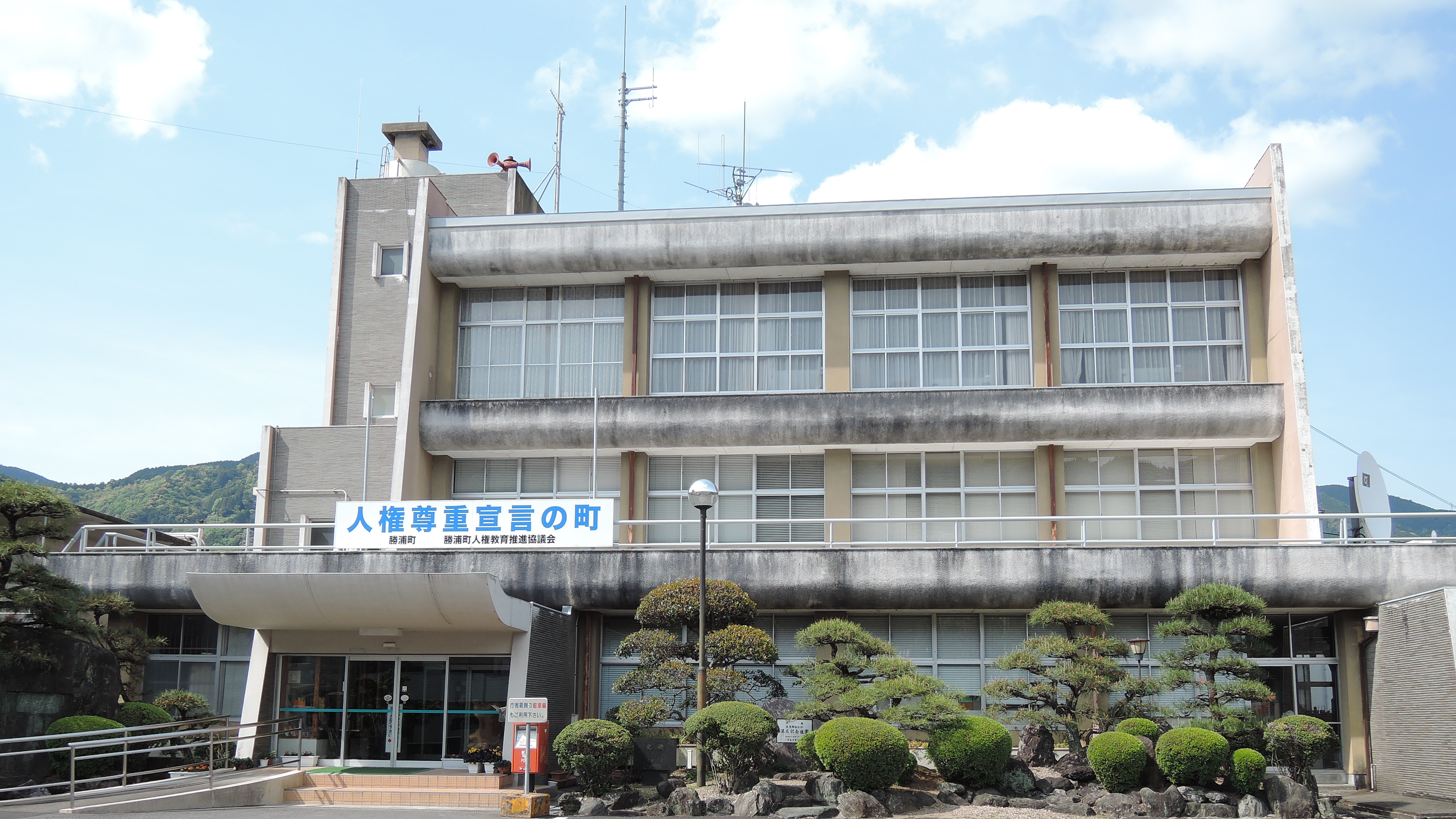
Katsuura Town Hall

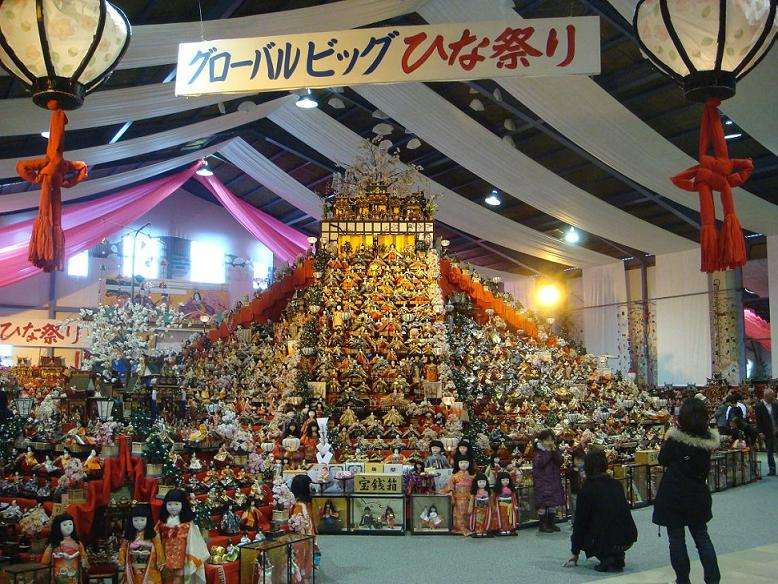
Hinamatsuri Festival

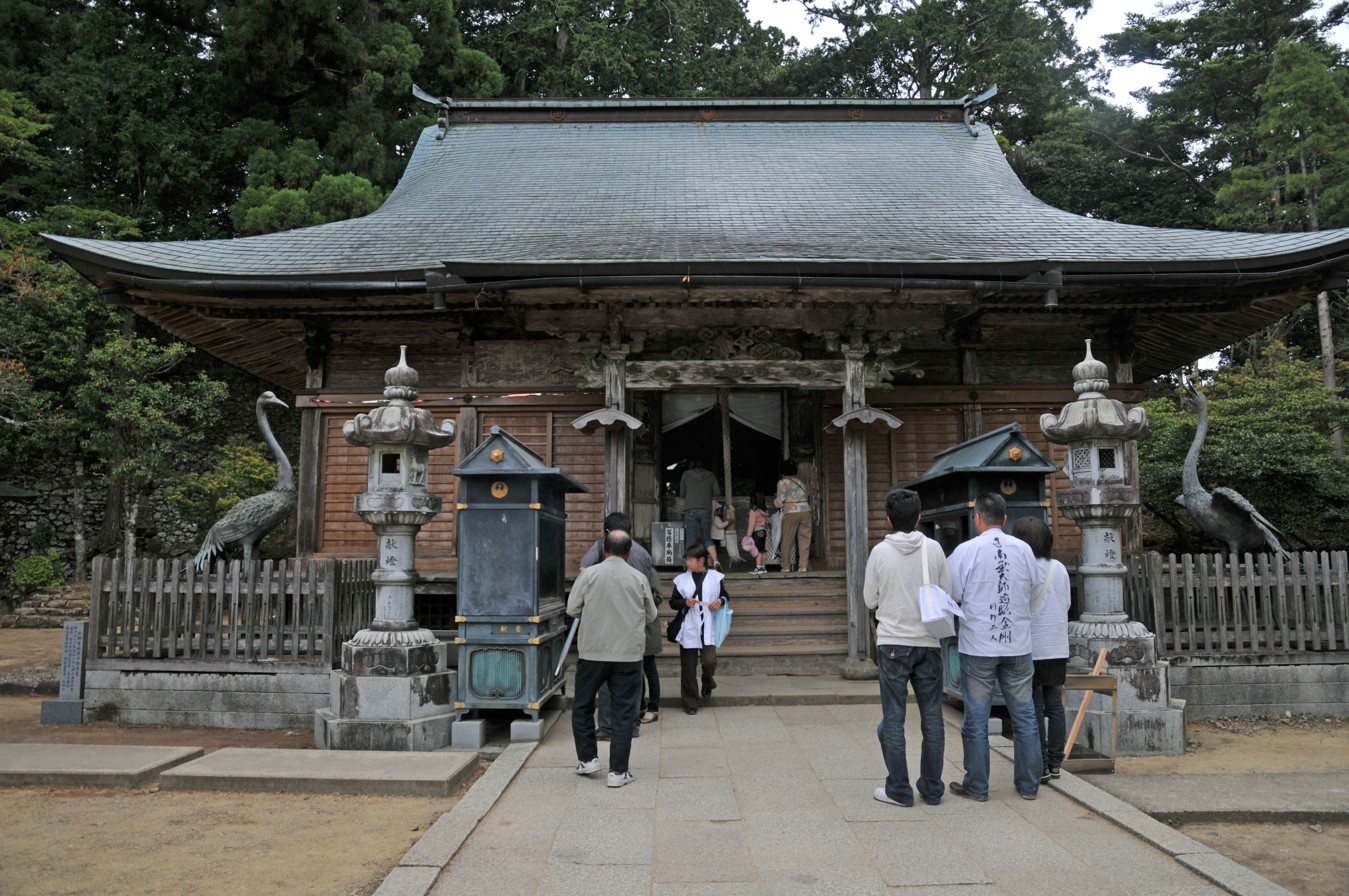
Kakurin-ji

Katsuura (勝浦町, Katsuura-chō) is a town located in Katsuura District, Tokushima Prefecture, Japan. As of 30 June 2022, the town had an estimated population of 4,884 in 2159 households and a population density of 70 persons per km². The total area of the town is 69.85 square kilometres (26.97 sq mi).

== Geography ==
Katsuura is located in the eastern part of Tokushima Prefecture on the island of Shikoku. Most of the town is in the basin of the Katsuura River, which runs from west to north in the center of the town. It is surrounded by mountains, such as Mt. Nakatsumine on the border with Tokushima City in the north. The highest altitude is 972.1 meters at the summit of Mt. Rokuro, and the lowest altitude is 20 meters above sea level. Parts of the town are within the borders of the Higashi Sankei Prefectural Natural Park.

=== Neighbouring municipalities ===
Tokushima Prefecture

- Anan
- Kamikatsu
- Komatsushima
- Naka
- Sanagōchi
- Tokushima

== Climate ==
Katsuura has a humid subtropical climate (Köppen Cfa) characterized by warm summers and cool winters with light snowfall. The average annual temperature in Katsuura is 14.9 °C. The average annual rainfall is 2128 mm with September as the wettest month. The temperatures are highest on average in August, at around 25.2 °C, and lowest in January, at around 4.8 °C.

== Demographics ==
Per Japanese census data, the population of Katsuura has been declining for the past 70 years.

Historical population
Year	Pop.	±%
1920	7,399	—
1930	8,058	+8.9%
1940	8,306	+3.1%
1950	10,197	+22.8%
1960	9,646	−5.4%
1970	8,323	−13.7%
1980	7,811	−6.2%
1990	7,267	−7.0%
2000	6,736	−7.3%
2010	5,766	−14.4%

== History ==
As with all of Tokushima Prefecture, the area of Katsuura was part of ancient Awa Province. During the Edo period, the area was part of the holdings of Tokushima Domain ruled by the Hachisuka clan from their seat at Tokushima Castle. The village of Tanano (棚野村) was established within Katsuura District, Tokushima with the creation of the modern municipalities system on October 1, 1889. It was raised to town status on February 11, 1926 and changed its name to Yokose (横瀬町).On March 1, 1955 Yokose merged with the village of Ikuhina to form the town of Katsuura.

== Government ==
Katsuura has a mayor-council form of government with a directly elected mayor and a unicameral town council of 10 members. Katsuura, together the city of Komatsushima and town of Kamikatsu, contributes three members to the Tokushima Prefectural Assembly. In terms of national politics, the town is part of Tokushima 1st district of the lower house of the Diet of Japan.

== Economy ==
The economy of Katsuura is agricultural, and the town is one of the prefecture's leading mandarin orange producing areas,

== Education ==
Katsuura has two public elementary schools and one public middle school operated by the town government and one public high school operated by the Tokushima Prefectural Department of Education.

== Transportation ==
=== Railway ===
Katsuura does not have any passenger rail service. The closest station is Minami-Komatsushima Station on the JR Shikoku Mugi Line.

=== Highways ===
Katsuura is not on any national highway or expressway.

== Local attractions ==
- Higashi Sankei Prefectural Natural Park
- Kakurin-ji, 20th temple on the Shikoku Pilgrimage
