= Sanagōchi, Tokushima =

Sanagōchi 佐那河内村
- Village
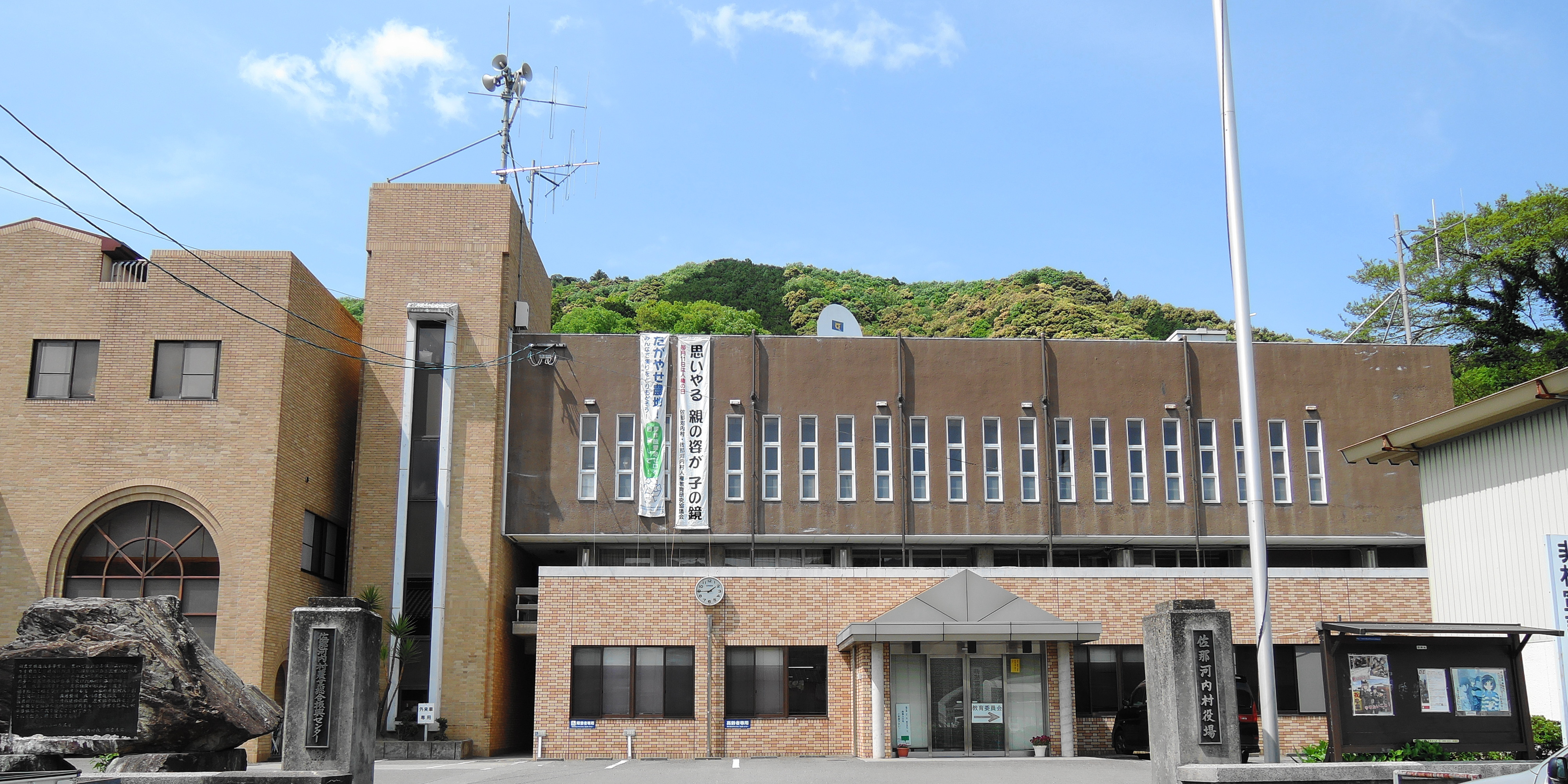
- Sanagochi village hall

- Flag Seal
- Location of Sanagōchi in Tokushima Prefecture

- Location in Japan
- Coordinates: 34°0′N 134°27′E
- Country: Japan
- Region: Shikoku
- Prefecture: Tokushima
- District: Myōdō

Area
  - Total: 42.28 km^{2} (16.32 sq mi)

Population (June 30, 2022)
  - Total: 1,983
  - Density: 46.90/km^{2} (121.5/sq mi)
- Time zone: UTC+09:00 (JST)
- City hall address: 71-1, Nakahen, Sanagochi-son, Myōdō-gun, Tokushima-ken 771-4195
- Website: Official website
- Symbols
- Bird: Japanese bush warbler
- Flower: Rhododendron
- Tree: Sudachi

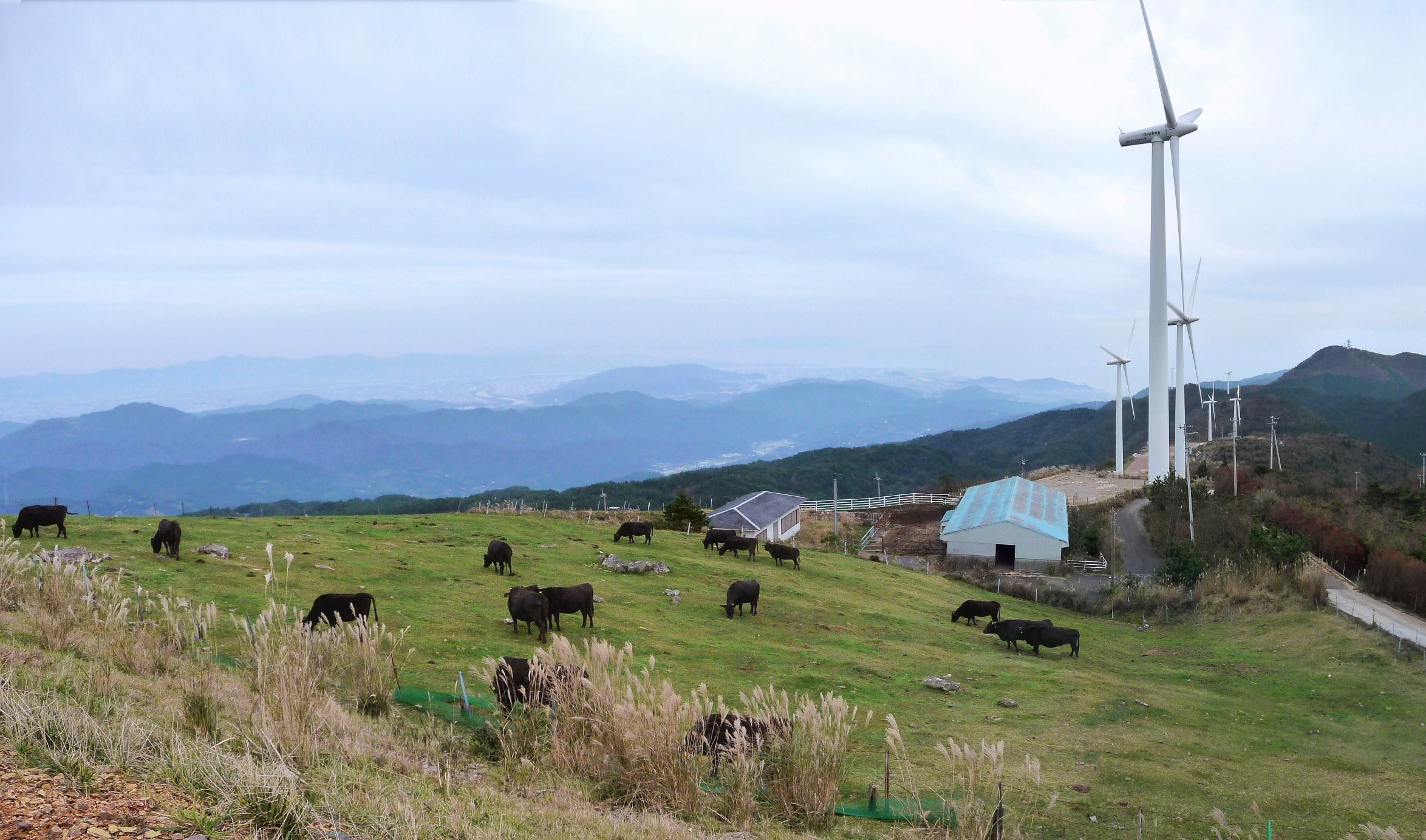
Okawahara Plateau

Sanagōchi (佐那河内村, Sanagōchi-son) is a village located in Myōdō District, Tokushima Prefecture, Japan. As of 30 June 2022, the village had an estimated population of 1983 and a population density of 47 persons per km^{2}. The total area of the village is 42.28 square kilometres (16.32 sq mi). Sanagōchi is the only village remaining in Tokushima Prefecture.

== Geography ==
Sanagōchi is located in northern part of Tokushima Prefecture on the island of Shikoku. It is 9.5 kilometers from east-to-west and 4.5 kilometers from north-to-south. The area is known for its spelunking caves.

=== Neighbouring municipalities ===
Tokushima Prefecture

- Ishii
- Itano
- Kamiita
- Kitajima
- Naruto
- Tokushima

=== Climate ===
Sanagōchi has a humid subtropical climate (Köppen Cfa) characterized by warm summers and cool winters with light snowfall. The average annual temperature in Sanagōchi is 14.5 °C. The average annual rainfall is 2128 mm with September as the wettest month. The temperatures are highest on average in August, at around 25.4 °C, and lowest in January, at around 3.9 °C.

== Demographics ==
Per Japanese census data, the population of Sanagōchi has been declining over the past 70 years.

Historical population
Year	Pop.	±%
1920	4,316	—
1930	4,055	−6.0%
1940	4,228	+4.3%
1950	5,225	+23.6%
1960	4,744	−9.2%
1970	3,955	−16.6%
1980	3,828	−3.2%
1990	3,467	−9.4%
2000	3,016	−13.0%
2010	2,588	−14.2%
2020	2,058	−20.5%

== History ==
As with all of Tokushima Prefecture, the area of Sanagōchi was part of ancient Awa Province. During the Edo period, the area was part of the holdings of Tokushima Domain ruled by the Hachisuka clan from their seat at Tokushima Castle. The village of Sanagōchi was established within Myōdō District, Tokushima with the creation of the modern municipalities system on October 1, 1889.

== Government ==
Sanagōchi has a mayor-council form of government with a directly elected mayor and a unicameral village council of eight members. Sanagōchi, together with the city of Tokushima, contributes ten members to the Tokushima Prefectural Assembly. In terms of national politics, the village is part of Tokushima 1st district of the lower house of the Diet of Japan.

== Economy ==
The economy of Sanagōchi is agricultural. The village is famous for producing momo ichigo (桃苺 (ももいちご); lit. 'peach strawberry'), a type of strawberry which is renowned for its juiciness and hence retails for very high prices – a large strawberry can sell for upwards of 500 yen (over $6 at 2011 exchange rates). Various sweets are made using it, such as chocolate and mochi-covered strawberries, and Häagen-Dazs Japan sells Momo Ichigo ice cream.

== Education ==
Sanagōchi has one public elementary school and one public middle school operated by the village government. The village does not have a high school.

== Transportation ==
=== Railway ===
Sanagōchi is not served by any passenger railway station. The nearest station is Tokushima Station on the JR Shikoku Kōtoku Line and Mugi Line.

=== Highways ===
- National Route 438
- National Route 439
