= Munetoki =

- Gender: Male

Origin
- Origin: Japanese
- Meaning: Different meanings depending on the kanji used

Munetoki (written: 宗辰 or 宗時) is a masculine Japanese given name. Notable people with the name include:

- Harada Munetoki (原田 宗時) (1565–1593), Japanese samurai
- Maeda Munetoki (前田 宗辰) (1725–1747), Japanese daimyō
