= Maeda Munetoki =

- 前田 宗辰
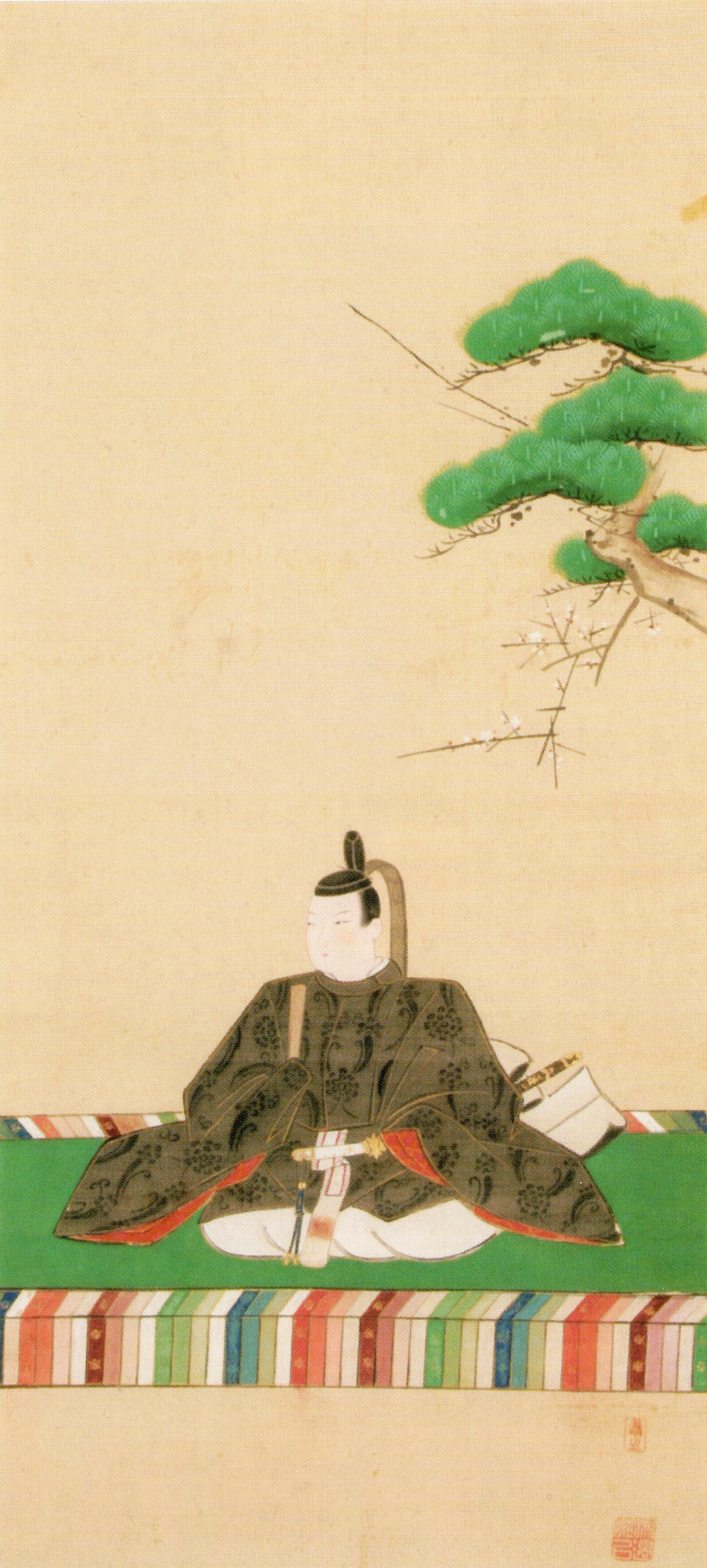

6th Daimyō of Kaga Domain
- In office 1745–1746
- Preceded by: Maeda Yoshinori
- Succeeded by: Maeda Shigehiro

Personal details
- Born: June 5, 1725 Kanazawa, Japan
- Died: January 18, 1747 (aged 21)
- Resting place: Nodayama Cemetery, Kanazawa, Japan
- Spouse: Daughter of Matsudaira Masakata
- Parent: Maeda Yoshinori (father)

Maeda Munetoki (前田 宗辰; June 5, 1725 – January 18, 1747) was an Edo period Japanese samurai, and the 6th daimyō of Kaga Domain in the Hokuriku region of Japan. He was the 7th hereditary chieftain of the Kanazawa Maeda clan.

Munetoki was born in Kanazawa as the eldest son of Maeda Yoshinori. His mother was a concubine. From 1725, he was given the childhood name of Matsudaira Katsu-maru (勝丸) later Matsudaira Inuchiyo (犬千代). He was sent to Edo in 1736, receiving the name of Maeda Toshikatsu (利勝), and the courtesy titles of Sado-no-kami and Sakonoe-shosho and court rank of Senior 4th Grade, lower rank. He was received in formal audience by Shōgun Tokugawa Yoshimune in 1737, who granted him a kanji from his name, which thus became Maeda Munetoki. In 1744, he was wed to a daughter of Matsudaira Masakata of Aizu Domain. In 1745, on his father’s death, he became daimyō and his titles were changed to Kaga-no-kami and Sakonoe-chusho. However, later the same year, his wife died in childbirth, and he followed less than a month later at the age of 21.

Kaga Domain passed to his younger brother Shigehiro.

== Family ==
- Father: Maeda Yoshinori
- Mother: Atae no Kata later Joshuin
- Wife: Matsudaira Tsunehime (d.1745), daughter of Matsudaira Masakata of Aizu Domain
- Child: Son (1745)

Preceded by Maeda Yoshinori	6th (Maeda) daimyō of Kaga; 1745–1746	Succeeded by Maeda Shigehiro
