= Matsudaira Katataka =

- 松平容敬
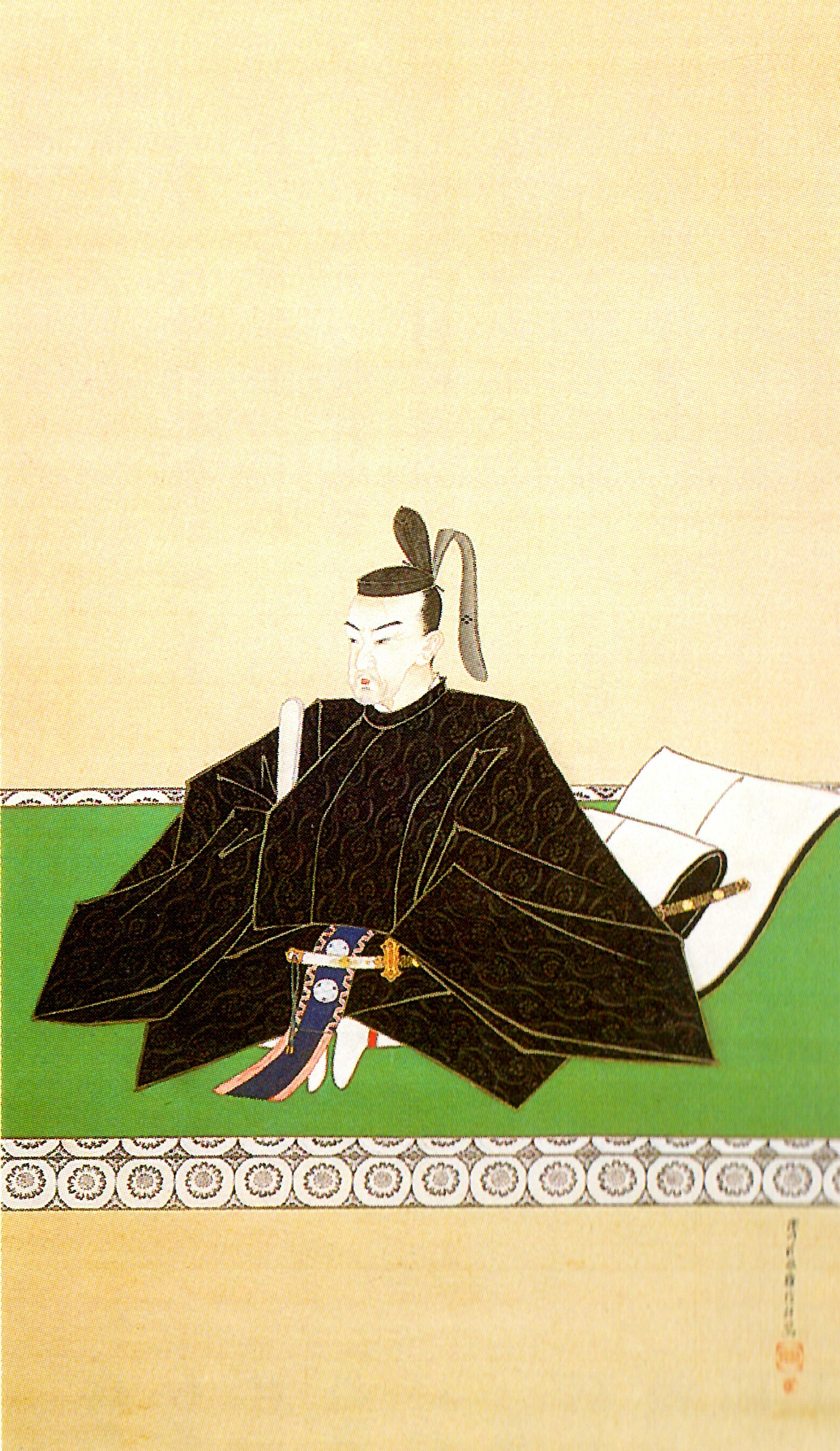
- Matsudaira Katataka portrait at Hanitsu Jinja, Inawashiro, Fukushima

8th Daimyō of Aizu Domain
- In office 1822–1852
- Monarchs: Shōgun: Tokugawa Ienari; Tokugawa Ieyoshi
- Preceded by: Matsudaira Katahiro
- Succeeded by: Matsudaira Katamori

Personal details
- Born: June 14, 1806
- Died: February 29, 1852 (aged 45)
- Spouses: (1) Setsuhime, daughter of Satake Yoshimasa of Kubota Domain; (2) Atsuhime, daughter of Maeda Narinaga of Kaga Domain
- Parent: Matsudaira Yoshikazu (father)

Matsudaira Katataka (松平 容敬, June 14, 1806 – February 29, 1852) was the 8th daimyō of Aizu Domain in Mutsu Province, Japan (modern-day Fukushima Prefecture). His courtesy title was Sakonoe-gon-chūshō and Jijū, and his Court rank was Senior Fourth Rank, Lower Grade.

== Biography ==
Matsudaira Katataka was born to Matsudaira Yoshikazu, the daimyō of Takasu Domain, in Mino Province, and was the grandson of Tokugawa Harumori of Mito Domain. His youth name was Keizaburō (慶三郎). With the unexpected death of Matsudaira Katahiro without heir following so soon after Matsudaira Kataoki, the domain was in danger of attainder. To prevent this, the rōjū of the domain renamed Keizaburō as "Katataka" and passed him off to the Shogunal authorities as a posthumous son of Matsudaira Kataoki, and thus a younger brother to Katahiro. The ruse worked, and he officially became daimyō in 1822 with the courtesy title of Higo-no-kami. This was changed to Sakonoe-gon-shōshō in 1825 and to Sakonoe-gon-chūshō in 1827.

He was wed to a daughter of Satake Yoshimasa of Kubota Domain, and re-wed after her death to a daughter of Maeda Narinaga of Kaga Domain, but he had three daughters and no male heir.

Though Matsudaira Katataka was praised by Ii Naosuke as a loyal servant of the Tokugawa shogunate, his fame was to be ultimately eclipsed by his adopted son Matsudaira Katamori (the son of his birth brother Matsudaira Yoshitatsu).

== See also ==
- Hoshina clan
