= Maeda Shigenobu =

Japanese daimyō

- 前田 重靖
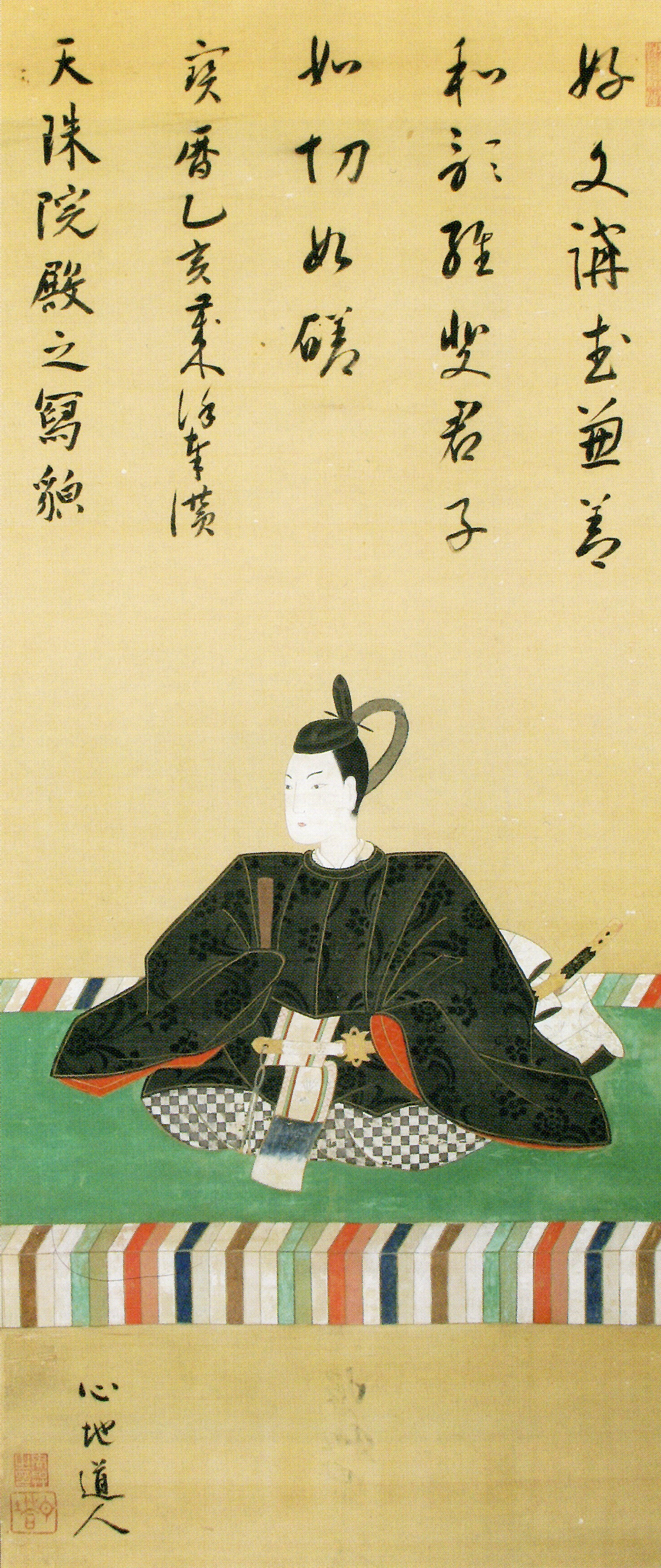

8th Daimyō of Kaga Domain
- In office 1753–1753
- Preceded by: Maeda Shigehiro
- Succeeded by: Maeda Shigemichi

Personal details
- Born: December 31, 1735 Edo, Japan
- Died: October 25, 1753 (aged 17)
- Parent: Maeda Yoshinori (father)

Maeda Shigenobu (前田 重靖; December 31, 1735 – October 25, 1753) was an Edo period Japanese samurai, and the 8th daimyō of Kaga Domain in the Hokuriku region of Japan. He was the 9th hereditary chieftain of the Kanazawa Maeda clan.

Shigenobu was born in Kanazawa as the fifth son of Maeda Yoshinori. His mother was a concubine, Onui no Kata later Zenryo’in. His childhood name was Kisaburō (嘉三郎) and his youth name was Maeda Toshichika (利見). In 1748, during the height of the O-Ie Sōdō known as the “Kaga Sōdō” he was brought to Edo together with his elder brother Maeda Toshikazu, and was adopted as provisional heir to the young Maeda Shigehiro. He was presented in formal audience to Shōgun Tokugawa Ieshige in 1751. Less than two years later, with the unexpected death of his elder brother, Maeda Shigehiro in 1753, he became daimyō and was renamed Maeda Shigenobu, upon being received in formal audience once again by Shōgun Tokugawa Ieshige. Three months after becoming daimyō he departed Edo for Kanazawa; however, en route he contacted measles and died shortly after reaching Kanazawa at the age of 17. At that time, he was betrothed with Tokugawa Yoshihime, Tokugawa Munenao's daughter.

Kaga Domain passed to his younger brother Shigemichi.

Preceded by Maeda Shigehiro	8th (Maeda) daimyō of Kaga; 1753	Succeeded by Maeda Shigemichi
