= Maeda Shigemichi =

Japanese daimyō

- 前田 重靖
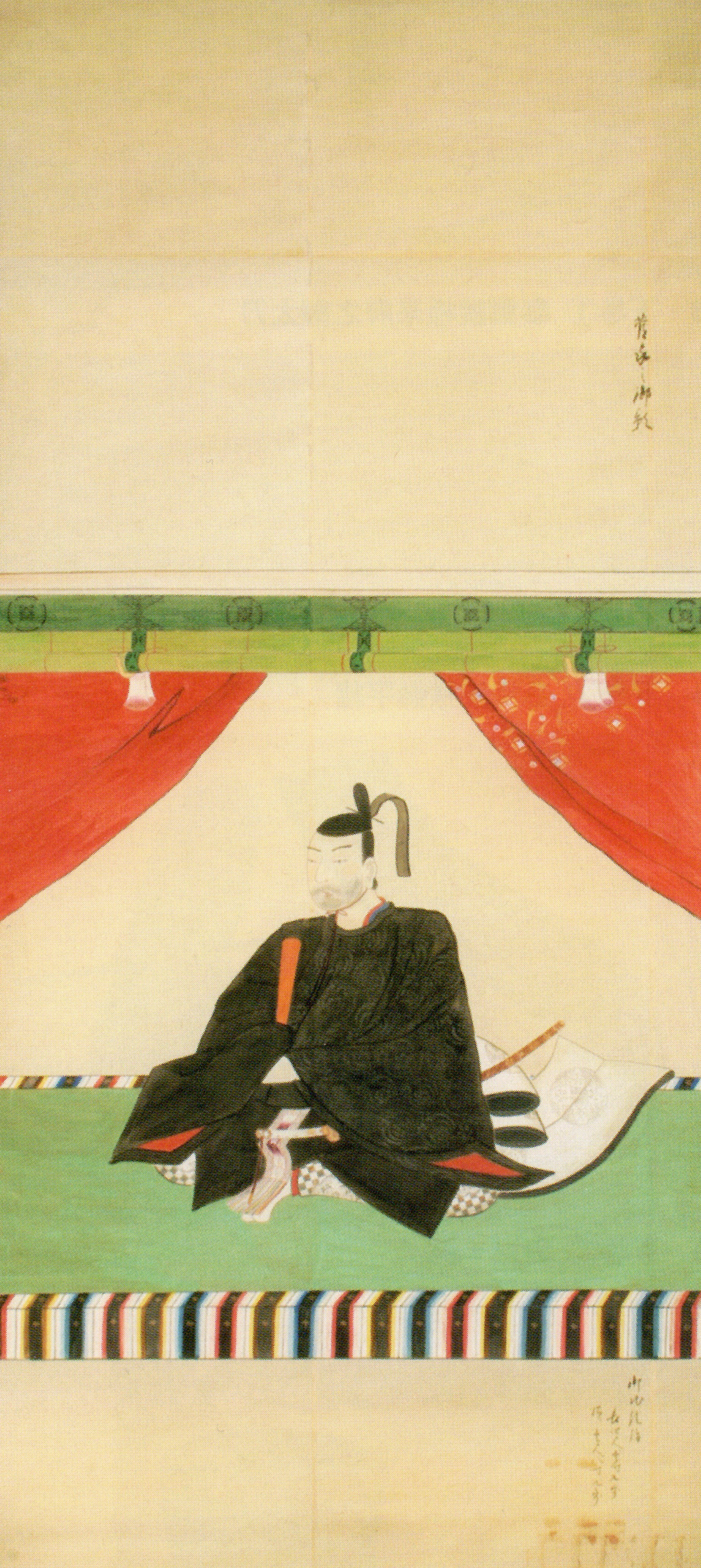

9th Daimyō of Kaga Domain
- In office 1753–1771
- Preceded by: Maeda Shigenobu
- Succeeded by: Maeda Harunaga

Personal details
- Born: November 30, 1741 Kanazawa, Japan
- Died: July 7, 1786 (aged 44)
- Parent: Maeda Yoshinori (father)

Maeda Shigemichi (前田 重教; November 30, 1741 – July 7, 1786) was an Edo period Japanese samurai, and the 9th daimyō of Kaga Domain in the Hokuriku region of Japan. He was the 10th hereditary chieftain of the Kanazawa Maeda clan.

Shigemichi was born in Kanazawa as Kenjiro (健次郎), the seventh son of Maeda Yoshinori. His mother was a concubine and he was initially destined to be adopted by Kaga clan retainer Moirai Nagakata; however, with so many of his brother dying untimely deaths during the O-Ie Sōdō known as the “Kaga Sōdō” these plans were cancelled. In 1753, he was named to succeed his brother Maeda Shigenobu and became daimyō the same year. He immediately prepared to depart for Edo, but came down with measles (the same disease which had killed his brother), and his departure was delayed by a year. He was received in formal audience by Shogun Tokugawa Ieshige in 1754 and his posthumous adoption and position as daimyō was confirmed.

One of his first steps was to end the “Kaga Sōdō” by siding firmly with the conservative faction, ending the fiscal experiments begun by Ōtsuki Denzō. While this purge brought political stability back to the domain, the domain finances immediately spiralled out of control. In 1759, Kanazawa Castle burned down, along with much of the surrounding castle town, and to domain was forced to borrow 50,000 ryō from the shogunate for immediate repairs.

Sgigemichi was a noted patron of Noh and Kyōgen drama.

Shigemichi yielded headship to his half-brother Harunaga in 1771, and died in 1786 at age 44.

== Family ==
- Father: Maeda Yoshinori
- Mother: Jitsujoin
- Wife: Tokugawa Senmanhime, daughter of Tokugawa Munemasa of Wakayama Domain
- Concubines:
  - Oshun no Kata later Eshoin
  - Omoyo no Kata later Shingetsuin
  - Oyasu no Kata
  - Tenrin’in
  - Ohatsu no Kata later Shugetsuin
- Children:
  - Kunihime (1761-1771) by Oshun no Kata
  - Eihime (1766-1801) married Matsudaira Katasada by Oshun no Kata
  - daughter (1776) by Omoyo no Kata
  - Maeda Naritaka (1778-1795) by Oyasu no Kata
  - Fujihime married Matsudaira Yorinori (Takamatsu domain) by Tenrin’in
  - Maeda Narinaga by Tenrin’in
  - Son (1785) by Ohatsu no Kata

Preceded by Maeda Shigenobu	9th (Maeda) daimyō of Kaga; 1753–1771	Succeeded by Maeda Harunaga
