= Sakai Tadamichi =

Count Sakai Tadamichi
- 酒井忠宝
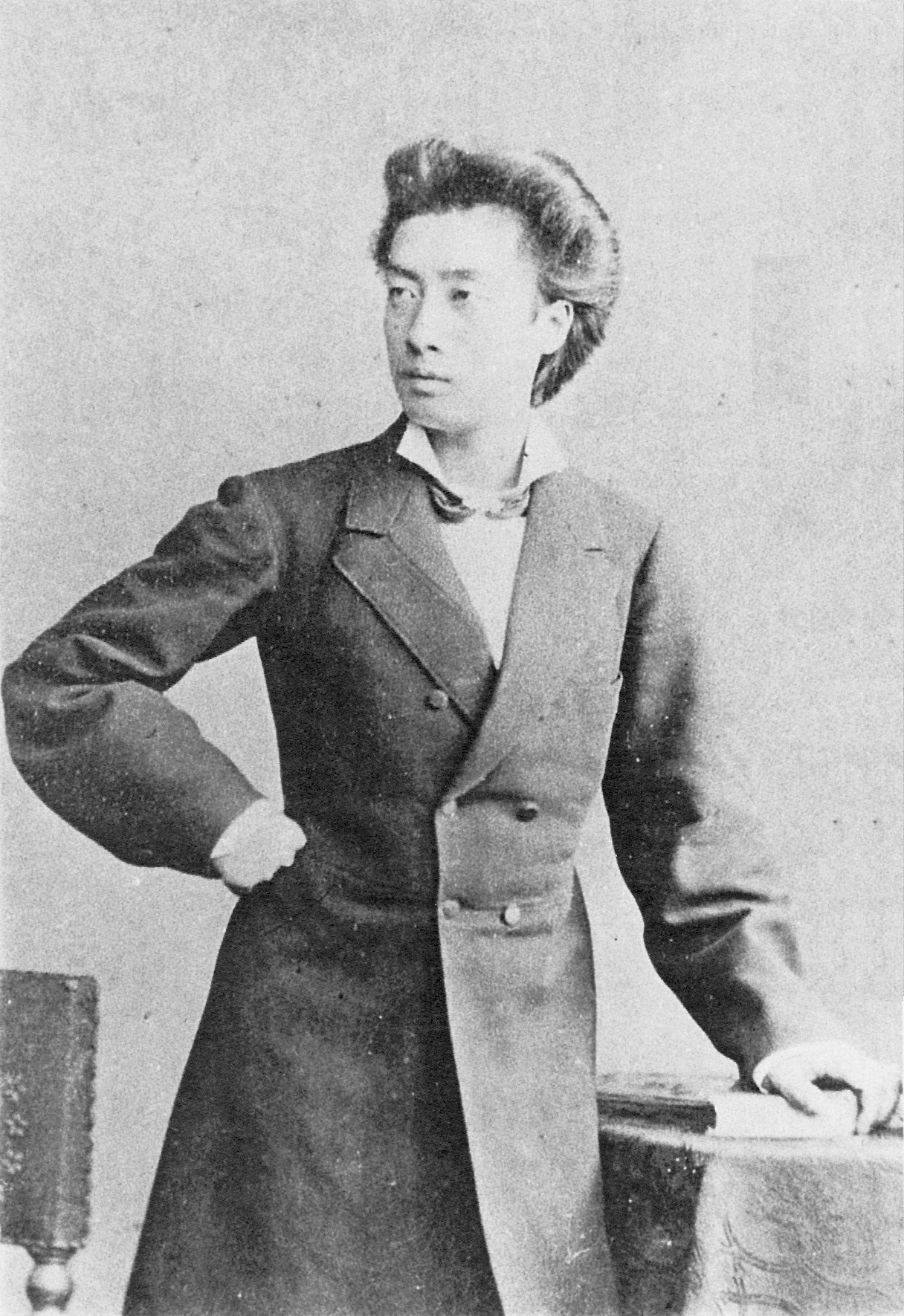
- Sakai Tadamichi

12th Daimyō of Shōnai Domain
- In office 1868–1871
- Monarch: Emperor Meiji
- Preceded by: Sakai Tadazumi
- Succeeded by: -none-

Personal details
- Born: July 14, 1856
- Died: September 17, 1921 (aged 65)
- Spouse(s): Suzu, daughter of Endo Taneki of Mikami Domain
- Parent: Sakai Tadaaki (father)

Sakai Tadamichi (酒井忠宝; July 14, 1856 – September 17, 1921) was the 12th (and final) daimyō of Shōnai Domain during Bakumatsu period Japan. His courtesy title was Saemon-no-jō.

== Biography ==
Sakai Tadamichi was the sixth son of Sakai Tadaaki, the 6th daimyō of Shōnai. He became daimyō in 1868, when his elder brother, the 11th daimyō of Shōnai Sakai Tadazumi was deposed by the Meiji government over his role in leading the domain during the Boshin War as part of the pro-Tokugawa Ōuetsu Reppan Dōmei. Shōnai Domain was initially punished by a reduction in kokudaka to 120,000 koku; however, the Meiji government was in a state of confusion and flux. From 1868 to 1869, Sakai Tadamichi was also appointed ruler of Aizu Domain, which had been seized from the Aizu-Matsudaira clan. In June 1869, he was ordered to relocate to Iwakitaira Domain with a further reduction to 70,000 koku, but the order was rescinded only a month later. The same month, he was appointed imperial governor of Shōnai. He relocated to Tokyo after the abolition of the han system and retired in 1880, returning the position of chieftain of the Sakai clan to his elder brother Sakai Tadazumi. He died in 1921.
