= Sakai Tadazumi =

Japanese daimyo (1853–1915)

Count Sakai Tadazumi
- 酒井忠篤
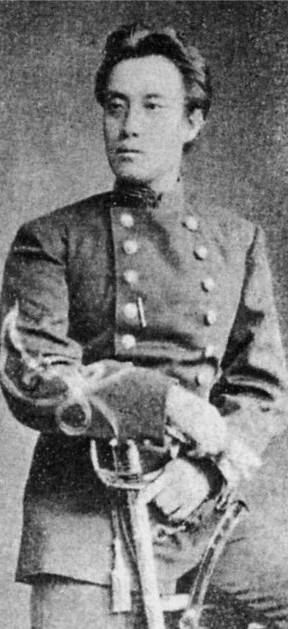

11th Daimyō of Shōnai Domain
- In office 1862–1868
- Monarchs: Shōgun: Tokugawa Iemochi; Tokugawa Yoshinobu
- Preceded by: Sakai Tadatomo
- Succeeded by: Sakai Tadamichi

Personal details
- Born: March 22, 1853
- Died: June 6, 1915 (aged 62)
- Spouse(s): Shizu, daughter of Tokugawa Yoshinori of the Tayasu-Tokugawa
- Parent: Sakai Tadaaki (father)

Sakai Tadazumi (酒井忠篤; March 22, 1853 – June 6, 1915) was the 11th daimyō of Shōnai Domain during Bakumatsu period Japan. His courtesy title was Saemon-no-jō.

== Biography ==
Sakai Tadazumi was the fifth son of Sakai Tadaaki, the 5th daimyō of Shōnai. When his elder brother, the 10th daimyō of Shōnai Sakai Tadatomo died with no heir, he was named successor posthumously in 1862 and his position was officially confirmed by the shogunate in 1863. A couple of months later, he was appointed the commander of the Shinchōgumi, an elite paramilitary force of Rōshigumi who were created to provide extra security for the city of Edo. In 1864, Tagawa and Yuri districts in Dewa Province were added to his domains, raising his kokudaka by 27,000 koku to 170,000 koku. However, in 1867 growing dissatisfaction over high taxation and a severe crop failure led to widespread rioting and unrest in Shōnai Domain. Tadazumi remained in Edo, largely leaving affairs of the domain to his karō and other retainers. He led the Shinchōgumi in an arson attack which burned the Edo residence of Satsuma Domain at the end of 1866. In 1868, during the Boshin War, Shōnai Domain became a key member of the pro-Tokugawa Ōuetsu Reppan Dōmei. In the early stages of the conflict, Shōnai forces won several key military engagements against Akita Domain and Shinjō Domain; however, towards the end of the year it became clear to Tadazumi that the pro-Tokugawa cause was ultimately doomed. Although the domain had not suffered any military defeat, he surrendered to the Meiji government at the end of the year.

Accused by the new government of treason, Tadazumi was forced into retirement in favor of his adopted son, and the domain was reduced to 120,000 koku. In 1869 he was pardoned, and in 1870 was sent to Satsuma for military training, returning to a post in the Ministry of the Army in 1871. In 1872, he was commissioned as a lieutenant in the fledgling Imperial Japanese Army and was sent to Germany for training in April of that year. He returned to Japan in June 1879. In 1880, Sakai Tadamichi retired, and Tadazumi resumed the position of chieftain of the Tsuruoka Sakai clan. He returned to Tsuruoka in 1881. In 1884, he became a Count (hakushaku) in the new kazoku peerage.
