= Maeda Harunaga =

Japanese daimyō

- 前田 治脩

10th Daimyō of Kaga Domain
- In office 1771–1802
- Preceded by: Maeda Shigemichi
- Succeeded by: Maeda Narinaga

Personal details
- Born: November 30, 1741 Kanazawa, Japan
- Died: February 10, 1810 (aged 68)
- Parent: Maeda Yoshinori (father)

Maeda Harunaga (前田 治脩; February 4, 1745 – February 10, 1810) was an Edo period Japanese samurai and the 10th daimyō of Kaga Domain in the Hokuriku region of Japan. He was the 11th hereditary chieftain of the Kanazawa Maeda clan.

Harunaga was born in Kanazawa as Tokijiro (時次郎), the tenth son of Maeda Yoshinori. His mother was a concubine. He was initially destined for the Jōdo Shinshū priesthood, and was ordained as a priest at the temple of Shōkō-ji in Toyama in 1746; however, with so many of his brothers dying untimely deaths during the O-Ie Sōdō known as the “Kaga Sōdō,” Harunaga returned to secular life in 1768 under the name of Maeda Toshiari (利有). In 1771, his brother Maeda Shigemichi officially retired, and he became daimyō. Toshiari was received in formal audience by Shōgun Tokugawa Ieharu the same year and was granted a kanji from Ieharu's name, becoming Maeda Harunaga.

In 1792, he established the Kaga Domain's han school, Meirin-dō, and is also noted for restoring the famed Kenroku-en gardens.

Shigemichi had a son, Maeda Naritaka, after he retired, whom Harunaga adopted in 1791; however, he died in 1795. Harunaga then adopted Shigemichi's second son, Maeda Narinaga. Although Harunaga married a daughter of Maeda Toshimichi and had his own son, Toshinobu in 1800, when he retired, he turned the domain over to Shigemichi's son, Narinaga. Narinaga then adopted Toshinobu as heir, but Toshinobu died in 1805. Harunaga lived to 1810.

== Family ==
- Father: Maeda Yoshinori (1690–1745)
- Mother: Onatsu no Kata later Jusei’in
- Wife: Maeda Masahime
- Concubine: Ito no Kata later Chikoin
- son: Maeda Toshinobu (1800-1805) by Ito
- Adopted Sons:
  - Maeda Naritaka (1778-1795)
  - Maeda Narinaga

Preceded by Maeda Shigemichi	10th (Maeda) daimyō of Kaga; 1771–1802	Succeeded by Maeda Narinaga
