= Maeda Shigehiro =

- 前田 重煕

7th Daimyō of Kaga Domain
- In office 1746–1753
- Preceded by: Maeda Munetoki
- Succeeded by: Maeda Shigenobu

Personal details
- Born: August 18, 1729 Edo, Japan
- Died: May 10, 1753 (aged 23)
- Parent: Maeda Yoshinori (father)

Maeda Shigehiro (前田 重煕; August 18, 1729 – May 10, 1753) was an Edo period Japanese samurai, and the 7th daimyō of Kaga Domain in the Hokuriku region of Japan. He was the 8th hereditary chieftain of the Kanazawa Maeda clan.

Shigehiro was born in Edo as the second son of Maeda Yoshinori. His mother was a concubine, Shinkyo-in. From 1743, he was given the childhood name of Matsudaira Kamejirō (亀次郎). In 1746, on the unexpected death of his elder brother, Maeda Munetoki, he became daimyō and was renamed Maeda Toshiyasu (利安); however, upon being received in formal audience by Shōgun Tokugawa Ieshige, he was granted a kanji from Ieshige's name, becoming Maeda Shigehiro.

Early in his tenure, the former ashigaru councillor, Ōtsuki Denzō, who had risen to considerable influence and power under Maeda Yoshinori was exiled to remote Gokayama. However, this precipated an O-Ie Sōdō known as the “Kaga Sōdō”. Shigehiro's wet nurse and the mother of Maeda Munetoki, Jōshuin, was poisoned and killed in an attempt of Shigehiro's life by one of Maeda Yoshinori's other concubines, Shinyō-in. This Shinyo-in was a supporter of Ōtsuki Denzō and incriminating letters were found in her possession. In 1748, Ōtsuki Denzō was forced to commit suicide. Kaga Domain remained in a state of turmoil when Shigehiro himself died only a couple of years later in 1753 at the age of 23 without heir. At that time he was betrothed with Matsudaira Chohime, Matsudaira Yoritaka's daughter.

Kaga Domain passed to his younger brother Shigenobu.

Preceded by Maeda Munetoki	7th (Maeda) daimyō of Kaga; 1746–1753	Succeeded by Maeda Shigenobu
