= Shōnai Domain =

Historical state

Coordinates: 38°43′43.46″N 139°49′28.39″E

Shōnai Domain 庄内藩
- under Tokugawa shogunate Japan
- 1622–1871
- Flag
- Capital: Tsurugaoka Castle
- Area
  - Coordinates
  - Type: Daimyō
- Historical era: Edo period
  - Established: 1622
  - Disestablished: 1871
- Today part of: part of Yamagata Prefecture

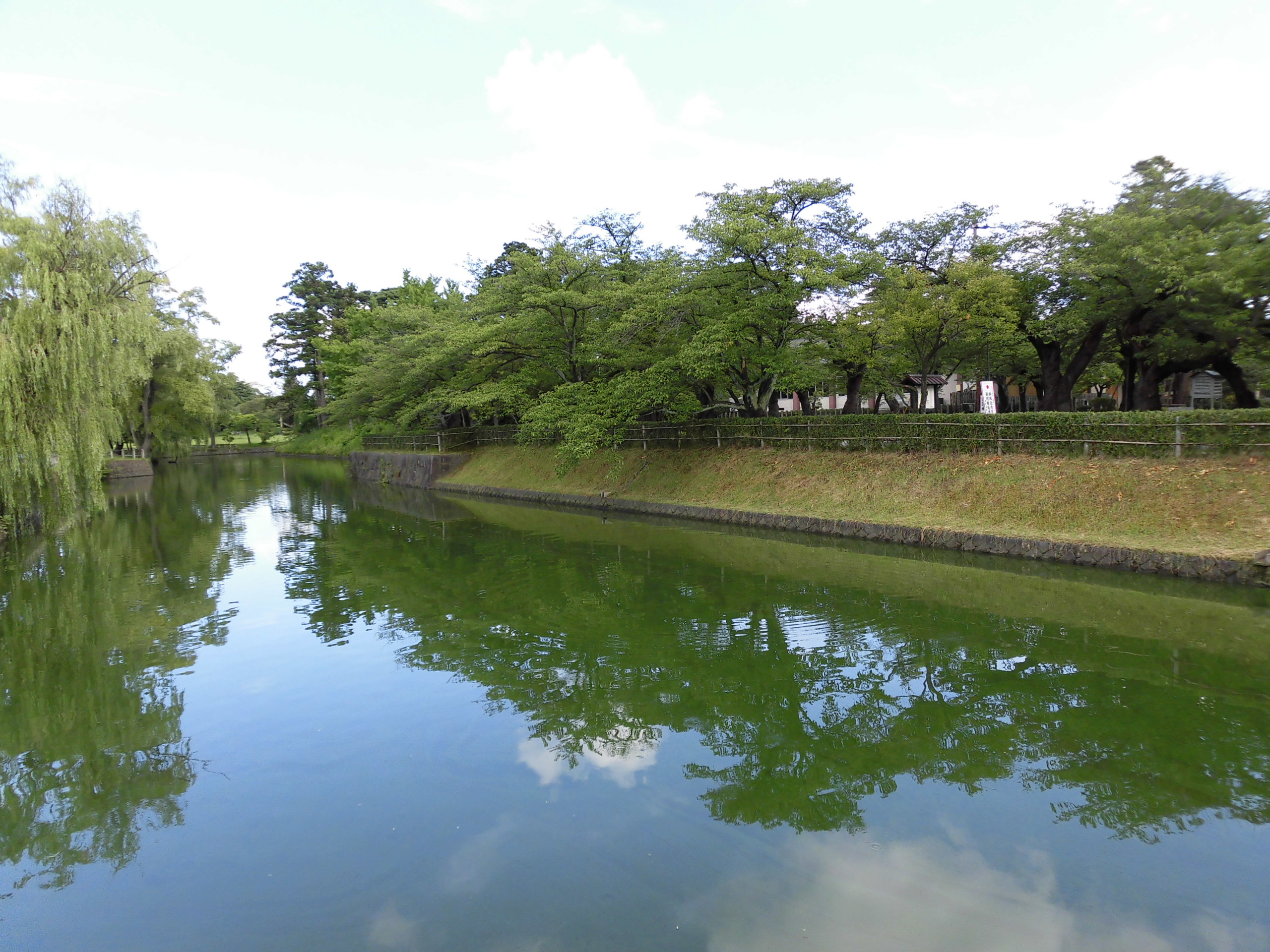
Moats of Tsuruoka Castle, the seat of the Shōnai Domain (Tsuruoka Domain)

Shōnai Domain (庄内藩, Shōnai-han) was a feudal domain in Edo period Japan, located in Dewa Province (modern-day Yamagata Prefecture), Japan. It was centered on Tsuruoka Castle in what is now the city of Tsuruoka in Yamagata Prefecture, and was thus also known as the Tsuruoka Domain (鶴岡藩, Tsuruoka han). It was governed for the whole of its history by the Sakai clan, which resulted in an unusually stable and prosperous domain. During their rule over Shōnai, the Sakai clan was ranked as a province-holding daimyō (国持ち大名, kunimochi daimyō) family, and as such, had the privilege of shogunal audiences in the Great Hall (Ohiroma) of Edo Castle. In the Boshin War of 1868–69, the domain joined the Ōuetsu Reppan Dōmei, the alliance of northern domains supporting the Tokugawa shogunate, but then later surrendered to the imperial side. As with all other domains, it was disbanded in 1871.

== History ==
The Sakai rose to prominence with Sakai Tadatsugu, who was one of Tokugawa Ieyasu's Shitennō, or four leading generals and the daimyō of Matsushiro Domain in Shinano Province. After the death of Mogami Yoshiaki many internal struggles for control of the Mogami clan, the former rulers of Dewa Province, arouse and caused their vast domain to be divided into several parts. Sakai Tadatsugu was awarded the coastal region consisting of Tagawa, Akumi and Murayama districts, which increased his kokudaka from 38,000 koku to 138,000 koku, and then to 150,000 koku. However, the lands of the Shōnai region were fertile and well-watered, and eminently suited for growing rice, which gave the Sakai clan actual revenues of more than 200,000 koku. This revenue was further supplemented by the developed of Sakata port for the coastal kitamaebune trade, which gave the clan an actual income of closer to 300,000 koku.

In 1805, the domain academy, the Chidōkan was established by the 7th daimyō, Sakai Tadaari. The domain faced a severe crisis during the time of the 9th daimyō, Sakai Tadakata, when it came to the attention of shōgun Tokugawa Ienari that the domain's revenues had been understated by some 200,000 koku for many decades. Ienari decided to relocate the Sakai clan to Nagaoka Domain (74,000 koku) and to move the Makino clan from Nagaoka to Kawagoe Domain (150,000 koku). Matsudaira Narisasa of in Kawagoe (who happened to be Ienari's son) would then be given Shōnai. The proposal sparked tremendous outrage in Shōnai domain, and a large number of commoners, merchants, samurai and officials descended upon Edo in 1840 to file protests and petitions in what came to be known as the Tenpo Gimin Jiken (天保義民事件). The move was cancelled by the timely deaths of both Ienari and his son Matsudaira Narisada within weeks of each other in 1841 and Shōnai was "punished" by being assigned various public works projects.

During the Bakumatsu period, Shōnai was assigned the task of building fortifications and providing increased security for Edo from the incursions of foreign ships, and had its official income increased to 167,000 koku in 1864. In January 1868, samurai from Shōnai domain joined with Kaminoyama Domain in an attack on the Satsuma Domain residence in Edo – which marks the start of the Boshin War. Shōnai was initially a strong supporter of the Ōuetsu Reppan Dōmei, an alliance of northern domains against the forces of the western-based Satsuma-Chōshu Alliance attempting to overthrow the Tokugawa shogunate. However, Shōnai (along with the other military leader in the region, Aizu Domain) did not sign initially sign the treaty forming the Alliance and only became an official member in early 1868. Shōnai was regarded with caution by the Satchō Alliance, as it had deep financial resources, and had rearmed with modern weapons supplied by the Schnell brothers. However, after the defection of Kubota Domain to the imperial side, and the defeat of the Northern Alliance at the Battle of Hokuetsu and the Battle of Aizu, Shōnai Domain surrendered without a fight in December. Sakai Tadazumi turned the domain over to his son, Sakai Tadamichi and the domain was reduced to 120,000 koku. However, in June 1869, the Sakai were ordered to relocate to Iwakitaira Domain. This move was strongly protested by the people of the domain, who raised 300,000 ryō as payment to the Meiji government, and obtained the support of Saigō Takamori to have the order rescinded. In 1870, the domain name was changed to Oizumi Domain (大泉藩, Oizumi-han). The domain was abolished together with all of the domains in the abolition of the han system in 1871, becoming Sakata Prefecture and Tsuruoka Prefecture, which then merged into Yamagata Prefecture. The Sakai clan was ennobled in 1885, becoming hakushaku (counts) in the kazoku peerage.

== List of daimyō ==
- Sakai clan (fudai) 1622–1871

#	Name	Tenure	Courtesy title	Court Rank	kokudaka
1	Sakai Tadakatsu (酒井忠勝)	1622–1647	Kunai-daiyu (宮内大輔)	Lower 4th (従四位下)	138,000 → 140,000koku
2	Sakai Tadamasa (酒井忠当)	1647–1660	Settsu-no-kami (摂津守)	Lower 4th (従四位下)	140,000 koku
3	Sakai Tadayoshi (酒井忠義)	1660–1681	Saemon-no-jō (左衛門尉)	Lower 4th (従四位下)	140,000 koku
4	Sakai Tadazane (酒井忠真)	1682–1731	Saemon-no-jō (左衛門尉)	Lower 4th (従四位下)	140,000 koku
5	Sakai Tadayori (酒井忠寄)	1731–1766	Saemon-no-jō (左衛門尉); Jijū (侍従)	Lower 4th (従四位下)	14,000 koku
6	Sakai Tadaatsu (酒井忠温)	1766–1767	Saemon-no-jō (左衛門尉)	Lower 4th (従四位下)	140,000 koku
7	Sakai Tadaari (酒井忠徳)	1767–1805	Saemon-no-jō (左衛門尉)	Lower 4th (従四位下)	140,000 koku
8	Sakai Tadakata (酒井忠器)	1805–1842	Saemon-no-jō (左衛門尉); Sakon'e-shōjō (左近衛小将))	Lower 4th (従四位下)	140,000 koku
9	Sakai Tadaaki (酒井忠発)	1842–1861	Saemon-no-jō (左衛門尉); Jijū (侍従)	Lower 4th (従四位下)	140,000 koku
10	Sakai Tadatomo (酒井忠寛)	1861–1862	Saemon-no-jō (左衛門尉)	Lower 4th (従四位下)	140,000 koku
11	Sakai Tadazumi (酒井忠篤)	1862–1868	Saemon-no-jō (左衛門尉)	Lower 4th (従四位下)	140,000 → 167,000 koku
12	Sakai Tadamichi (酒井忠宝)	1868–1871	-none-	5th (従五位)	167,000 -120,000 koku

=== Genealogy (simplified) ===
- I. Sakai Tadakatsu, 1st daimyō of Shōnai (Tsuruoka) (cr. 1622) (1594–1647; daimyō: 1622–1647)
  - II. Tadamasa, 2nd daimyō of Shōnai (Tsuruoka) (1617–1660; r. 1647–1660)
    - III. Tadayoshi, 3rd daimyō of Shōnai (Tsuruoka) (1644–1681; r. 1660–1681)
      - IV. Tadazane, 4th daimyō of Shōnai (Tsuruoka) (1671–1731; r. 1682–1731)
  - Tadatsune, 1st daimyō of Dewa-Matsuyama (1639–1675)
    - Tadayasu, 2nd daimyō of Dewa-Matsuyama (1657–1736)
      - V. Tadayori, 5th daimyō of Shōnai (Tsuruoka) (1704–1766; r. 1731–1766)
        - VI. Tadaatsu, 6th daimyō of Shōnai (Tsuruoka) (1732–1767; r. 1766–1767)
          - VII. Tadaari, 7th daimyō of Shōnai (Tsuruoka) (1755–1812; r. 1767–1805)
            - VIII. Tadakata, 8th daimyō of Shōnai (Tsuruoka) (1790–1854; r. 1805–1842)
              - IX. Tadaaki, 9th daimyō of Shōnai (Tsuruoka) (1812–1876; r. 1842–1861)
                - XI. Tadazumi, 11th daimyō of Shōnai (Tsuruoka), 17th and 19th family head, 1st Count (1853–1915; daimyō: 1862–1868; 17th family head: 1862–1868; 19th family head: 1880–1915; Count: cr. 1884)
                  - Tadanaga, 20th family head, 2nd Count (1888–1962; 20th family head: 1915–1962; 2nd Count: 1915–1947)
                    - Tadaakira, 21st family head (1917–2004; 21st family head: 1962–2004)
                      - Tadahisa, 22nd family head (born 1946; 22nd family head: 2004–present)
                        - Tadamasa (born 1974)
                - XII. Tadamichi, 12th daimyō of Shōnai (Tsuruoka), 18th family head (1856–1921; daimyō: 1868–1869; Governor: 1869–1871; 18th family head: 1871–1880)
              - X. Tadatomo, 10th daimyō of Shōnai (Tsuruoka) (1839–1862; r. 1861–1862)

== Bakumatsu period holdings ==
- Dewa Province (Uzen)
  - 399 villages in Tagawa District
  - 249 villages in Akumi District
- Ezo (Ishikari)
  - 1 trading post in Hamamasu District
- Ezo (Teshio)
  - 1 trading post in Teshio District
  - 1 trading post in Nakagawa District
  - 1 trading post in Kawakami District
  - 1 trading post in Rumoi District
  - 1 trading post in Tomamae District

== Subsidiary domains ==
=== Dewa-Matsuyama Domain ===
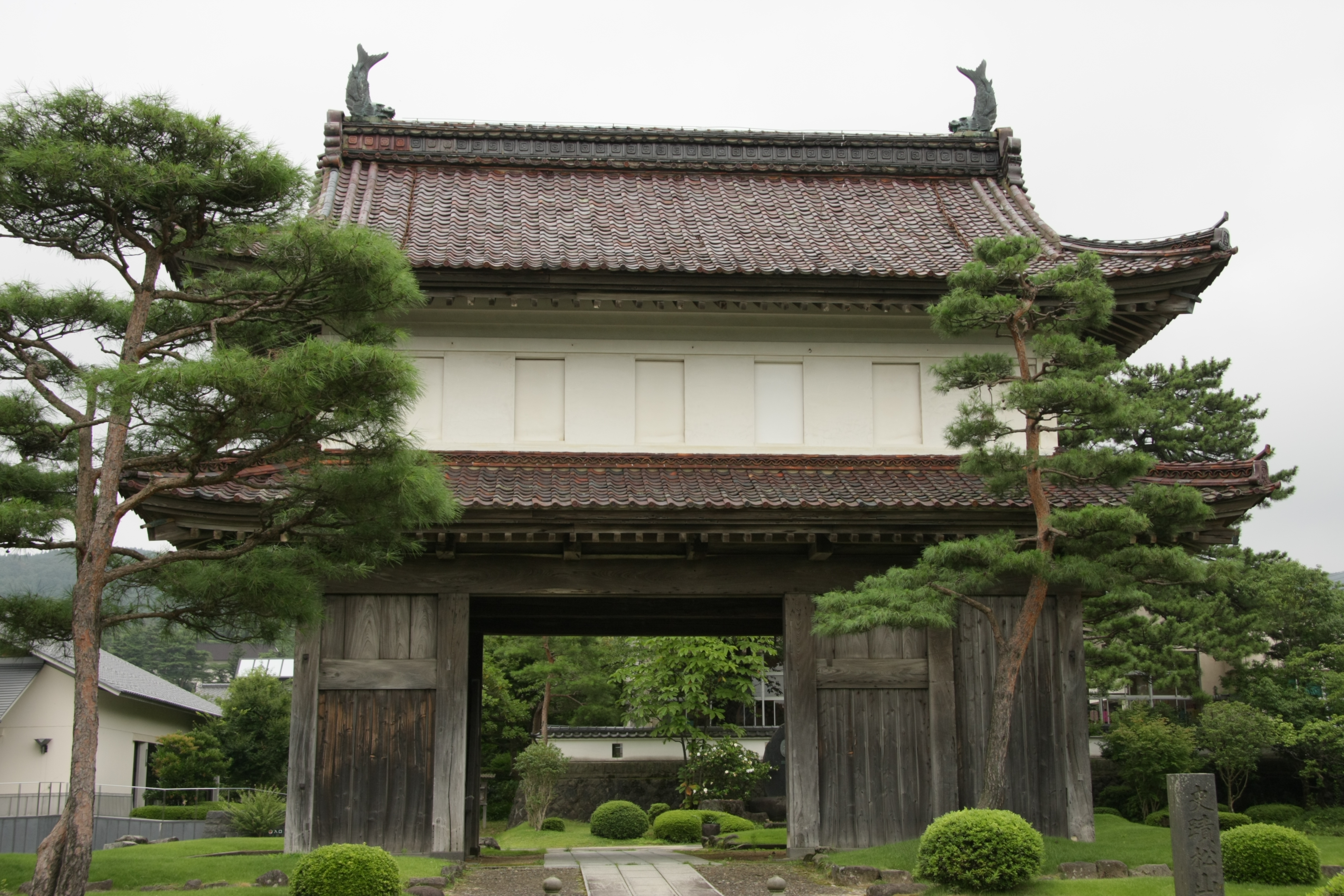
Gate of Dewa-Matsuyama Castle

Dewa Matsuyama Domain (出羽松山藩, Dewa Matsuyama han) was founded in 1647 for Sakai Tadatsune, the third son of Sakai Tadakatsu, who was assigned 20,000 koku of new rice lands in Akumi District. The third daimyō, Sakai Tadayoshi served as wakadoshiyori, and was awarded an additional 5000 koku in Kōzuke Province. He also built the Dewa-Matsuyama Castle, from which his successors continued to rule until the Meiji Restoration. During the Boshin War, the domain sided with the Ōuetsu Reppan Dōmei, for which it was punished by the Meiji government with the loss of 2500 koku. It was renamed Matsumine Domain (松嶺藩, Matsumine han) in 1869, and was abolished with all the other domains in 1871. The final daimyō, Sakai Tadamasa subsequently received the kazoku peerage title of shishaku (viscount).

- Sakai clan (fudai) 1647–1871

#	Name	Tenure	Courtesy title	Court Rank	Kokudaka
1	Sakai Tadatsune (酒井忠恒)	1647–1675	Daigaku-no-kami (大学頭)	Lower 5th (従五位下)	20,000 koku
2	Sakai Tadayasu (酒井忠予)	1675–1732	Iwami-no-kami (石見守)	Lower 5th (従五位下)	20,000 koku
3	Sakai Tadayoshi (酒井忠休)	1732–1787	Iwami-no-kami (石見守)	Lower 5th (従五位下)	20,000 → 25,000 koku
4	Sakai Tadataka (酒井忠崇)	1787–1798	Iwami-no-kami (石見守)	Lower 5th (従五位下)	25,000 koku
5	Sakai Tadanori (酒井忠禮)	1798–1821	Daigaku-no-kami (大学頭))	Lower 5th (従五位下)	25,000 koku
6	Sakai Tadamichi (酒井忠方)	1821–1845	Iwami-no-kami (石見守)	Lower 5th (従五位下)	25,000 koku
7	Sakai Tadayoshi (酒井忠良)	1845–1868	Kii-no-kami (紀伊守)	Lower 5th (従五位下)	25,000 koku
8	Sakai Tadamasa (酒井忠匡)	1868–1871	Daigaku-no-kami (大学頭)	Lower 5th (従五位下)	25,000 → 22,500 koku

==== Bakumatsu-period holdings ====
- Dewa Province (Uzen)
  - 62 villages in Murayama District
  - 10 villages in Tagawa District
  - 44 villages in Akumi District
- Kōzuke Province
  - 6 villages in Seta District

=== Ōyama Domain ===
Ōyama Domain (大山藩, Ōyama-han) was founded in 1647 for Sakai Tadatoki, the seventh son of Sakai Tadakatsu, who was assigned 10,000 koku of new rice lands in Tagawa District. It reverted to the parent domain on his death in 1668 without an heir.
