= Matsudaira Kataoki =

- 松平容住
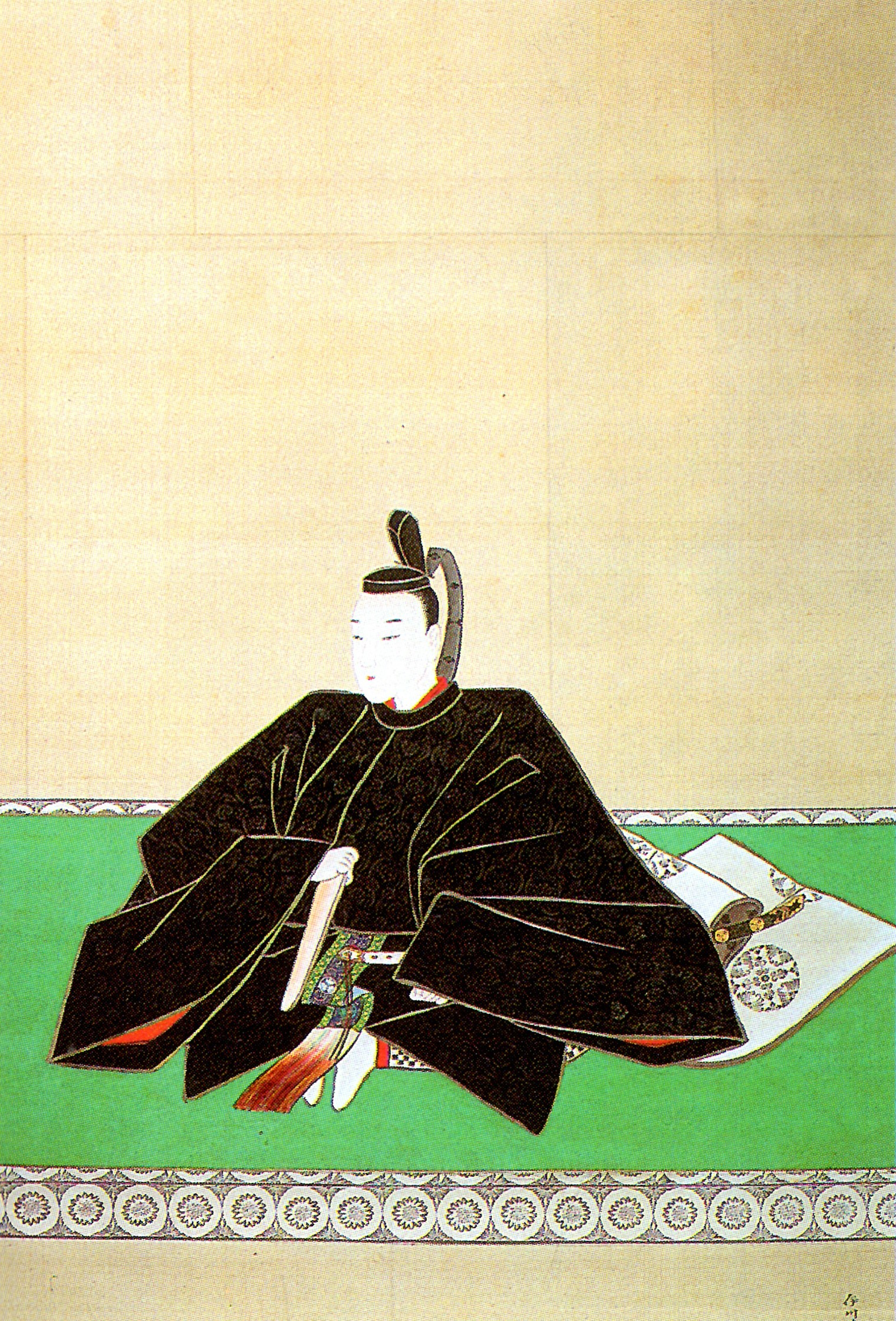
- Matsudaira Kataoki

6th Daimyō of Aizu Domain
- In office 1805–1806
- Monarch: Shōgun: Tokugawa Ienari
- Preceded by: Matsudaira Katanobu
- Succeeded by: Matsudaira Katahiro

Personal details
- Born: January 7, 1779
- Died: February 15, 1806 (aged 27)
- Spouse(s): Kenhime, daughter of Ii Naohide
- Domestic partner(s): commoner, Ishikawa clan
- Parent: Matsudaira Katasada (father)

Matsudaira Kataoki (松平容住, January 7, 1779 – February 15, 1806) was the 6th daimyō of Aizu Domain in southern Mutsu Province, Japan (modern-day Fukushima Prefecture).

== Biography ==
Matsudaira Kataoki was the eldest son of Matsudaira Katasada, the ninth son of Matsudaira Masakata, 3rd daimyō of Aizu Domain. In 1789, he received the courtesy titles of "Jijū" and "Wakasa-no-kami": however, the 5th daimyō of Aizu, Matsudaira Katanobu, died before formal adoption procedures were completed, and Kataoki was thus a posthumous adoption. He shows signs of continuing the fiscal reform policies of Matsudaira Katanobu, but died less than 5 months after assuming office.

His wife was a daughter of Ii Naohide of Hikone Domain; however his second son and heir, Matsudaira Katahiro, was born to a concubine of the Ishikawa clan.
