= Matsudaira Katasada =

Daimyo of the middle Edo period; 4th lord of Aizu

- 松平容貞
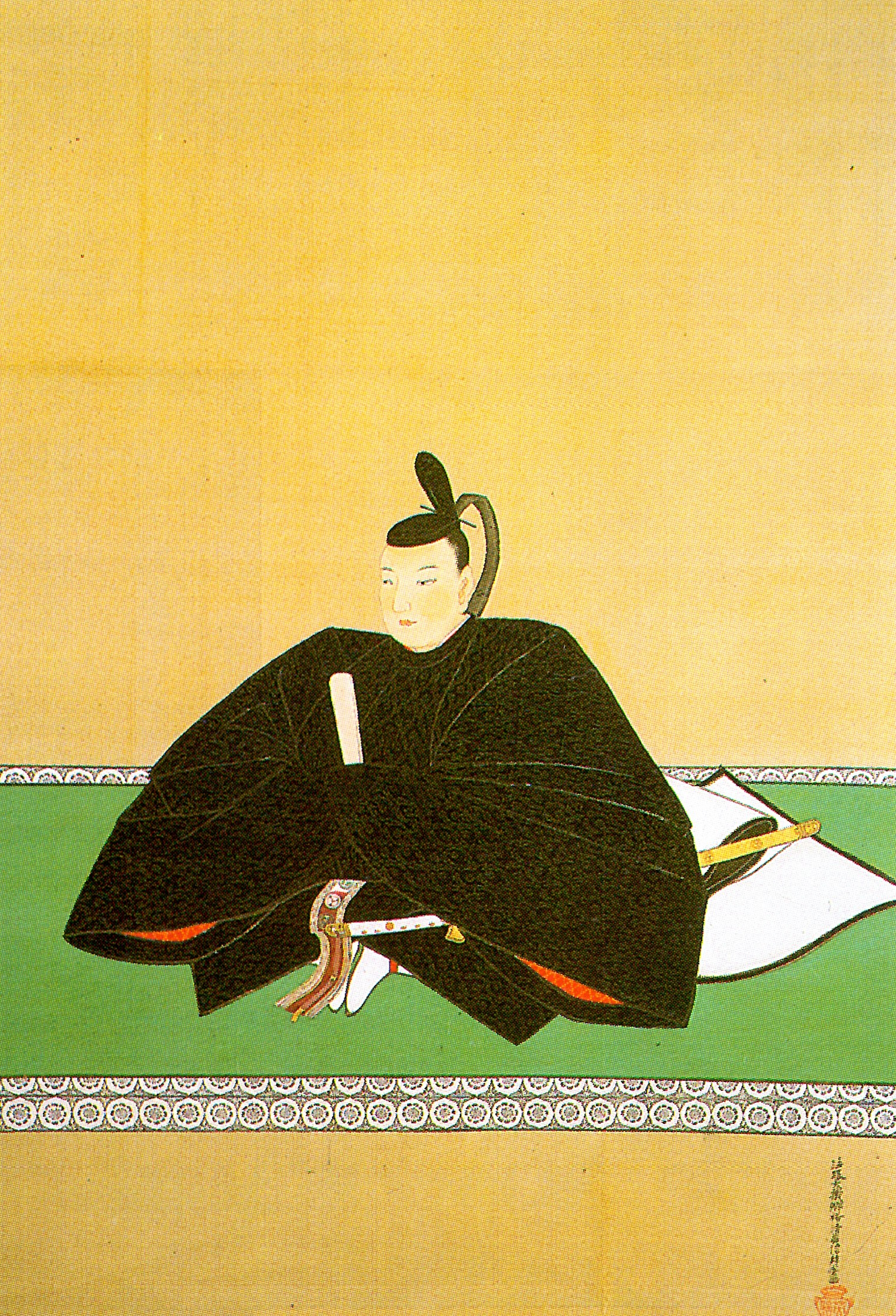
- Matsudaira Katasada portrait at Hanitsu Jinja, Inawashiro, Fukushima

4th Daimyō of Aizu Domain
- In office 1731–1750
- Monarchs: Shōgun: Tokugawa Yoshimune; Tokugawa Ieshige
- Preceded by: Matsudaira Masakata
- Succeeded by: Matsudaira Katanobu

Personal details
- Born: October 2, 1724
- Died: October 26, 1750 (aged 26)
- Spouse(s): Tomoe, daughter of Matsudaira Yoritoyo of Takamatsu Domain
- Parent: Matsudaira Masakata (father)

Matsudaira Katasada (松平容貞, October 2, 1724 – October 26, 1750) was the 4th daimyō of Aizu Domain in Mutsu Province, Japan (modern-day Fukushima Prefecture). His courtesy title was Sankonoe-gon-shō-shō and Jijū, and his Court rank was Junior Fourth Rank, Lower Grade.

== Biography ==
Matsudaira Katasada was the eighth son of Matsudaira Masakata and became daimyō in 1731 on his father's death. He was received in formal audience by Shogun Tokugawa Yoshimune in 1735. His courtesy title was promoted from Bungo-no-kami to Sankonoe-gon-shō-shō in 1740. Due to peasant unrest, he was able to pay only one half of his required taxes in 1749, and died in 1750 at the age of 27. He was married to a daughter of Matsudaira Yoritoyo of Takamatsu Domain, and had two sons and one daughter.

== See also ==
- Hoshina clan
