= Maeda Yoshinori =

Japanese daimyō

- 前田 吉徳

5th Daimyō of Kaga Domain
- In office 1723–1745
- Preceded by: Maeda Tsunanori
- Succeeded by: Maeda Munetoki

Personal details
- Born: September 10, 1690
- Died: July 11, 1745 (aged 54)
- Resting place: Nodayama Cemetery, Kanazawa, Japan
- Spouse: Adopted daughter of Tokugawa Tsunayoshi
- Domestic partner: 9 concubines
- Children: 10 sons, 8 daughters, 1 adopted daughter
- Parent: Maeda Tsunanori (father)

Maeda Yoshinori (前田 吉徳; September 10, 1690 – July 11, 1745) was a Japanese samurai during the Edo period, and the 5th daimyō of Kaga Domain in the Hokuriku region. He was the 6th hereditary chieftain of the Kanazawa Maeda clan.

Yoshinori was the third son of Maeda Tsunanori. His mother was a commoner and a concubine. From 1702, he was named heir and was given the childhood name of Katsumaru (勝丸) later Matsudaira Inuchiyo-maru, later becoming Toshitaka (利挙) and then Toshioki (利興). He underwent the genpuku ceremony with Shōgun Tokugawa Tsunayoshi presiding and was renamed Yoshiharu (吉治). In 1708, he was wed to Matsuhime, the adopted daughter of Tokugawa Tsunayoshi, the daughter of Tokugawa Tsunanari of Owari Domain. In 1723, his father retired, citing ill health, and he became daimyō of Kaga Domain as Maeda Yoshinori.

Although Kaga Domain was stable politically, and had been accorded the same status in audiences in Edo Castle as one of the Gosanke, the economic position of the domain was growing precarious despite its one million koku status. Yoshinori's first task was to initiate a reform of domain finances. Spending had been profligate under the tenure of Tsunanori, partly to offset suspicions of the wealth of Kaga Domain by the Tokugawa shogunate. Yoshinori appointed one of his favourites, Ōtsuki Denzō, of ashigaru background, as his senior economic advisor and implemented an unpopular program of cutting expenses, curbing speculation in the rice market, and passing sumptuary consumption rules. Under this program, the domain's financial situation improved considerably, and Yoshinori appointed Ōtsuki to ever greater positions of authority. This caused great resentment amongst the senior retainers and on the death of Yoshinori in 1745 at the age of 56, there was a conservative backlash which upended many of the reforms.

== Family ==
- Father: Maeda Tsunanori
- Mother: Omachi no Kata
- Wife: Tokugawa Matsuhime, daughter of Tokugawa Tsunanari of Owari Domain
- Concubines:
  - Atae no Kata later Joshuin
  - Shinkyo-in
  - Otaki no Kata later Seigetsu’in
  - Osada no Kata later Shin’nyoin
  - Onui no Kata later Zenryo’in
  - Oran no Kata
  - Onatsu no Kata later Jusei’in
  - Jitsujoin
  - Okiyo no Kata Jisenin
- Children:
  - Maeda Munetoki by Atae no Kata
  - Maeda Shigehiro by Shinkyo-in
  - Wakko’in (1731-1731) by Shinkyo-in
  - Maeda Toshikazu (1735-1759) by Osada no Kata
  - Maeda Shigenobu by Onui no Kata
  - Maeda Shigemichi by Jitsujoin
  - Maeda Harunaga by Onatsu no Kata
  - Kiyohime (1732–1750), married Asano Munetsune of Hiroshima Domain by Otaki no Kata
  - Sōhime (1733–1758), married Maeda Toshiyuki of Toyama Domain by Osada no Kata
  - Gōhime (1737-1762), married Satake Yoshimasa of Kubota Domain by Osada no Kata
  - Masahime (1739-1739) by Osada no Kata
  - Maeda Yasogoro (1741-1761) by Osada no Kata
  - Kiihime (1739-1740) by Oran no Kata
  - Nobuhime (1740-1798) married Sakai Tadayoshi by Onatsu no Kata
  - Yasuhime (1743-1743) by Onatsu no Kata
  - Maeda Toshizane (1743-1766) by Okiyo no Kata
  - daughter (1737)
  - son (1743)
- Adopted Daughter: Ayuhime married Nanbu Toshikatsu, Maeda Toshiakira's daughter

== Honors ==
- 1702: Senior 4th Grade, lower rank, Sakon-e-gon-shosho, Wakasa-no-kami
- 1723: Kaga-no-kami, Sakonoe-shosho; Sakon-e-gon-chusho

Preceded by Maeda Tsunanori	5th (Maeda) daimyō of Kaga; 1723–1745	Succeeded by Maeda Munetoki
