= Matsudaira Katanobu =

- 松平容頌
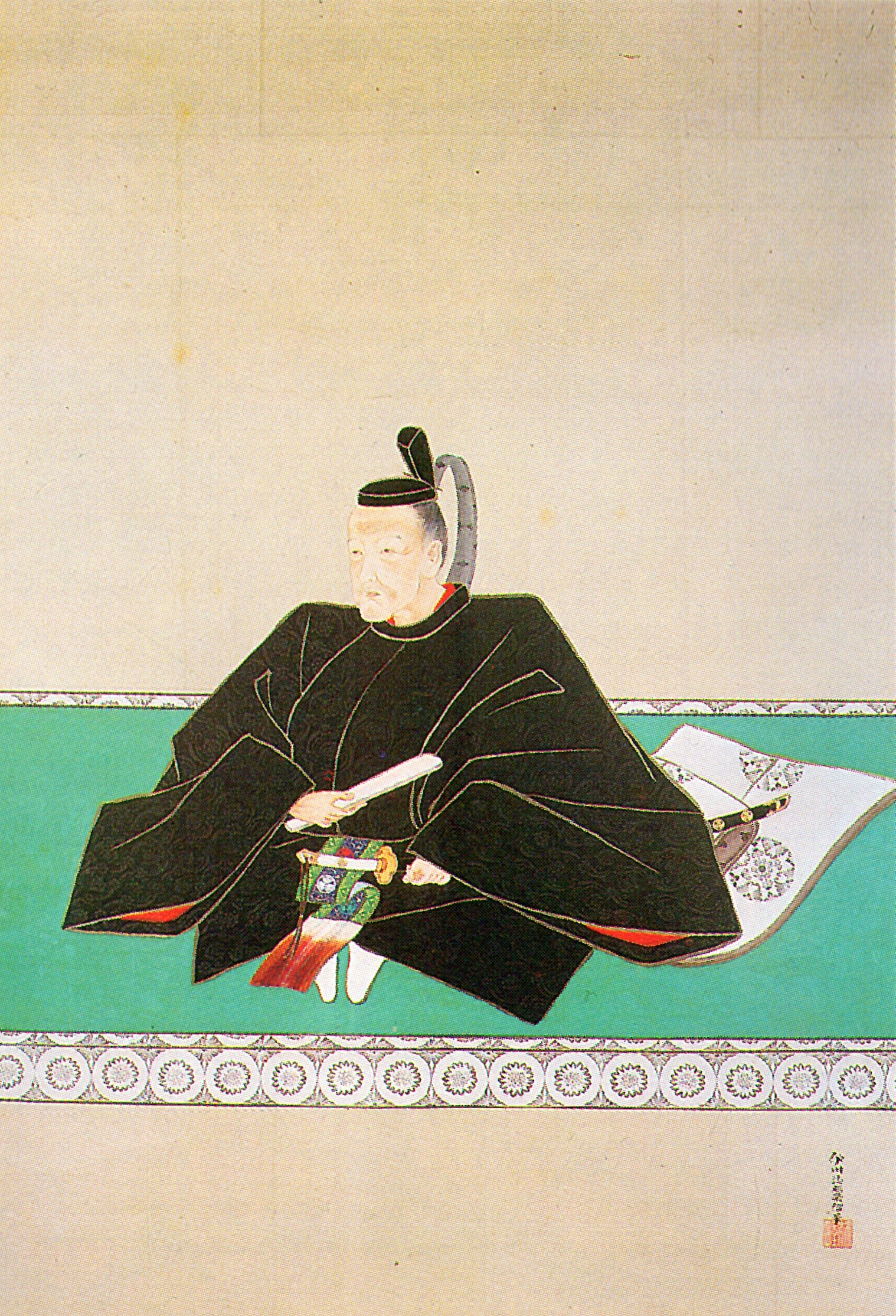
- Matsudaira Katanobu portrait at Hanitsu Jinja, Inawashiro, Fukushima

5th Daimyō of Aizu Domain
- In office 1750–1805
- Monarchs: Shōgun: Tokugawa Ieshige; Tokugawa Ieharu; Tokugawa Ienari
- Preceded by: Matsudaira Katasada
- Succeeded by: Matsudaira Kataoki

Personal details
- Born: February 22, 1744
- Died: August 23, 1805 (aged 61)
- Spouses: (1) Senhime, daughter of Abe Masachika of Oshi Domain; (2) Nobuhime, daughter of Mōri Shigenari of Chōshū Domain
- Domestic partner(s): Sawa, daughter of Date Munemura
- Parent: Matsudaira Katasada (father)

Matsudaira Katanobu (松平容頌, February 22, 1744 – August 22, 1805) was the 5th daimyō of Aizu Domain in Mutsu Province, Japan (modern-day Fukushima Prefecture). His courtesy title was Sankonoe-gon-chū-shō and Jijū, and his Court rank was Senior Fourth Rank, Upper Grade.

== Biography ==
Matsudaira Katanobu was the eldest son of Matsudaira Katasada and became daimyō in 1750 on his father's death. He was presented in formal audience to Shogun Tokugawa Ieshige in 1756, and was awarded the courtesy title of Higo-no-kami. In 1759, he visited Aizu for the first time, and in 1760, his courtesy title was promoted to Jijū and Sankonoe-gon-shō-shō in celebration of Tokugawa Ieshige's own promotion to the title of Udaijin. He was further promoted to Sankonoe-gon-chū-shō in 1765 and his court rank to Senior Fourth Rank, Lower Grade in 1770 and Senior Fourth Rank, Upper Grade in 1778. However, these purely honorific promotions were a tremendous drain on the domain's finances, and the peasants rose in revolt over high taxation on several occasions. The situation was made even worse by the effects of the Great Tenmei famine. Many efforts at fiscal reform were thwarted by conservative members of the clan government; however, Katanobu managed to implement severe fiscal frugality decrees, promoted rural reconstruction by encouraging sericulture and the planting of safflower and ginseng, implemented domain monopolies on wax and lacquerware, and establishing a sake brewing industry in Aizu.

During Katanobu's tenure, he dispatched 1500 Aizu samurai to Karafuto to guard against incursions by Imperial Russia.

Katanobu was also noted for greatly expanding the han school and promoting education in the domain.

He was married to a daughter of Abe Masachika of Oshi Domain, and after her death, remarried to a daughter of Mori Shigenari of Chōshū Domain, but had no sons, so he adopted his nephew Matsudaira Kataoki as heir. He died in 1805 at the age of 62.

== See also ==
- Hoshina clan
