= Matsudaira Katahiro =

- 松平容衆
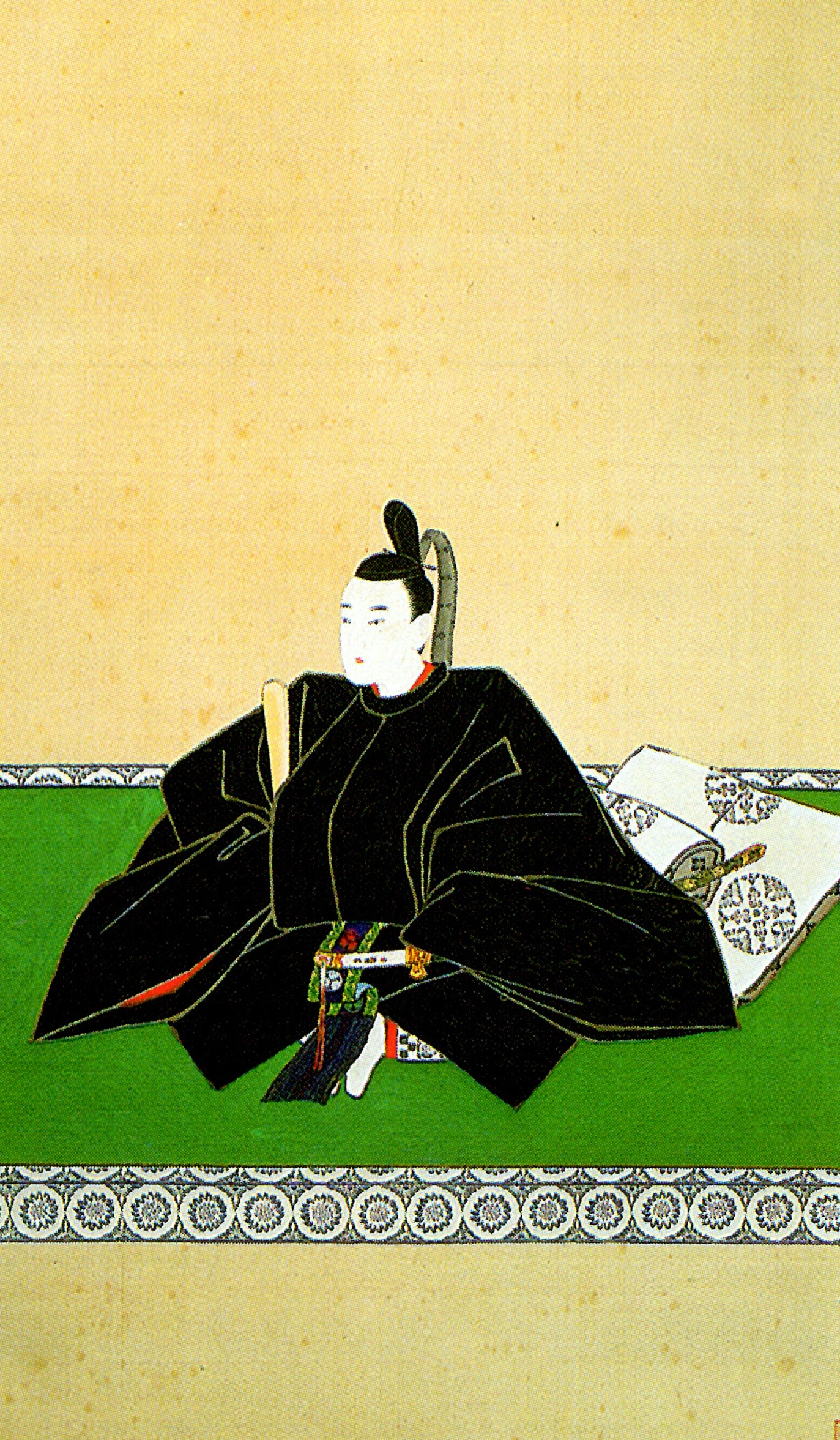
- Matsudaira Katahiro portrait at Hanitsu Jinja, Inawashiro, Fukushima

7th Daimyō of Aizu Domain
- In office 1806–1822
- Monarch: Shōgun: Tokugawa Ienari
- Preceded by: Matsudaira Kataoki
- Succeeded by: Matsudaira Katataka

Personal details
- Born: October 30, 1803
- Died: April 20, 1822 (aged 18)
- Spouse(s): Motohime, daughter of Tokugawa Ienari
- Parent: Matsudaira Kataoki (father)

Matsudaira Katahiro (松平容衆, October 30, 1803 – April 20, 1822) was the 7th daimyō of Aizu Domain in Mutsu Province, Japan (modern-day Fukushima Prefecture). His courtesy title was Higo-no-kami and Jijū, and subsequently raised to Sakonoe-gon-shōshō and his Court rank was Junior Fourth Rank, Lower Grade.

== Biography ==
Matsudaira Katahiro was the younger son of Matsudaira Kataoki and became daimyō in 1806 at the age of four on his father's death. In 1813, he was received in formal audience by Shogun Tokugawa Ienari and given the courtesy title of Higo-no-kami. This was changed to Sakonoe-gon-shōshō in 1816. He was wed to Moto-hime, the 15th daughter of Tokugawa Ienari, but died in 1822 without any heir. This ended the line of direct descent from Tokugawa Hidetada begun by Hoshina Masayuki, the first daimyō of Aizu.

== See also ==
- Hoshina clan
