= Tsurugaoka Castle =

Japanese castle constructed in Tsuruoka, Yamagata

- 鶴ヶ岡城
- Tsuruoka, Yamagata, Japan
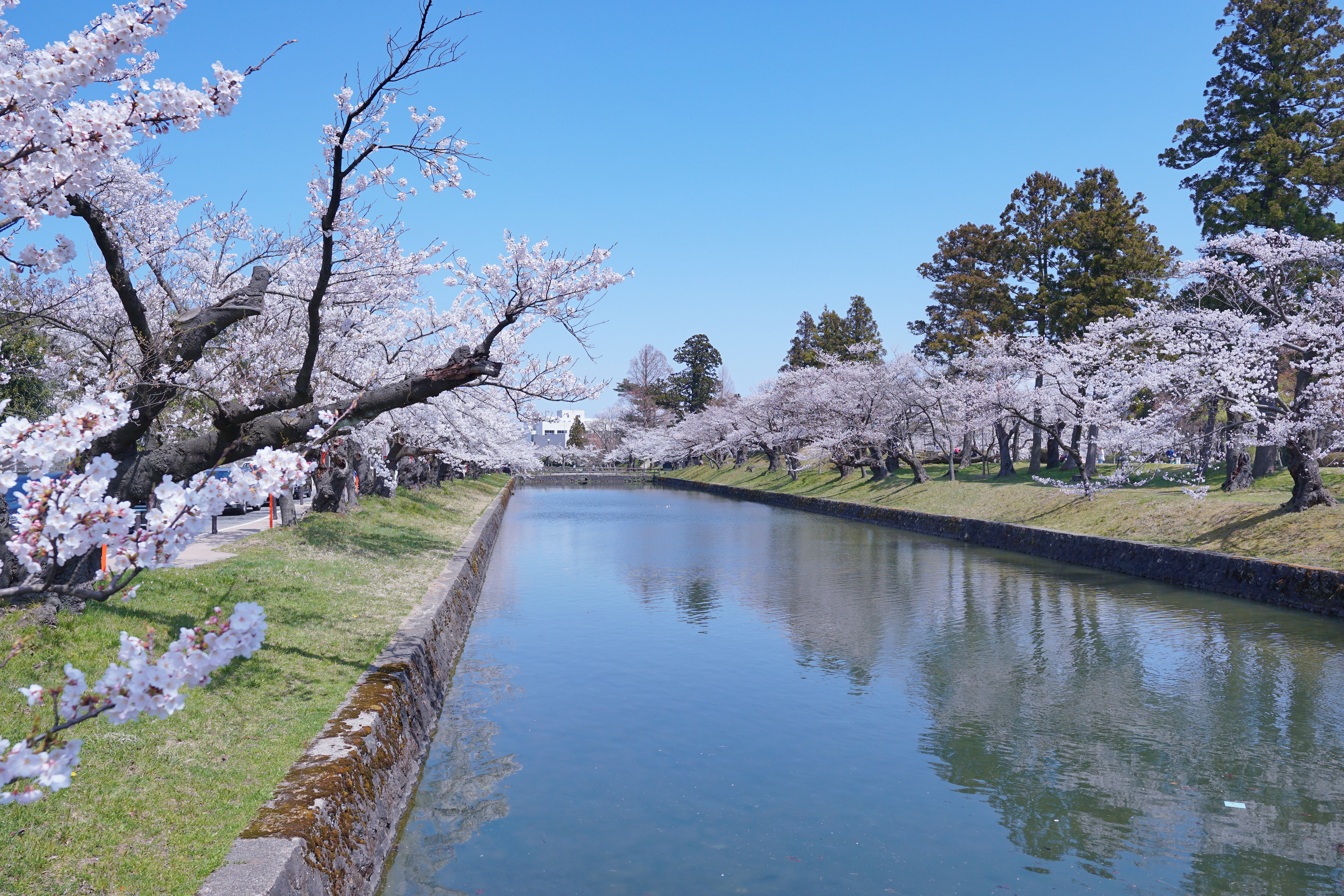
- moat of Tsurugaoka Castle

Site information
- Type: flatland-style Japanese castle
- Condition: ruins

Location
- Tsurugaoka Castle
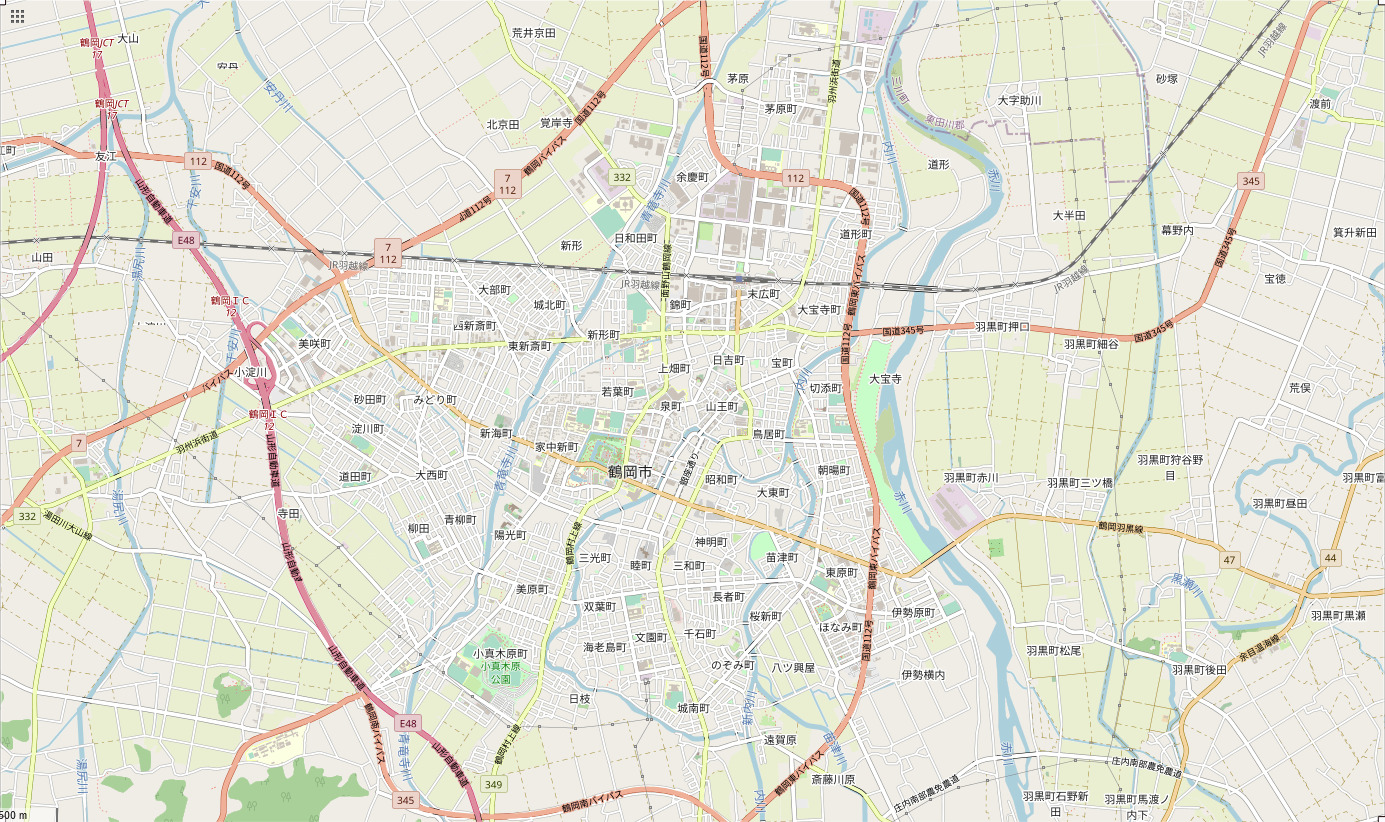
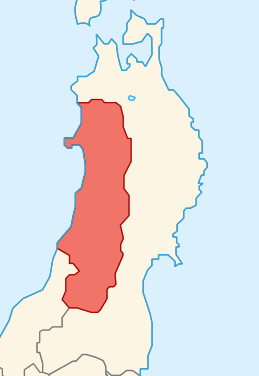
- Location within Tsuruoka, Yamagata Location within Yamagata Prefecture Location within Dewa, Japan Location within Japan
- Coordinates: 38°43′43.46″N 139°49′28.39″E

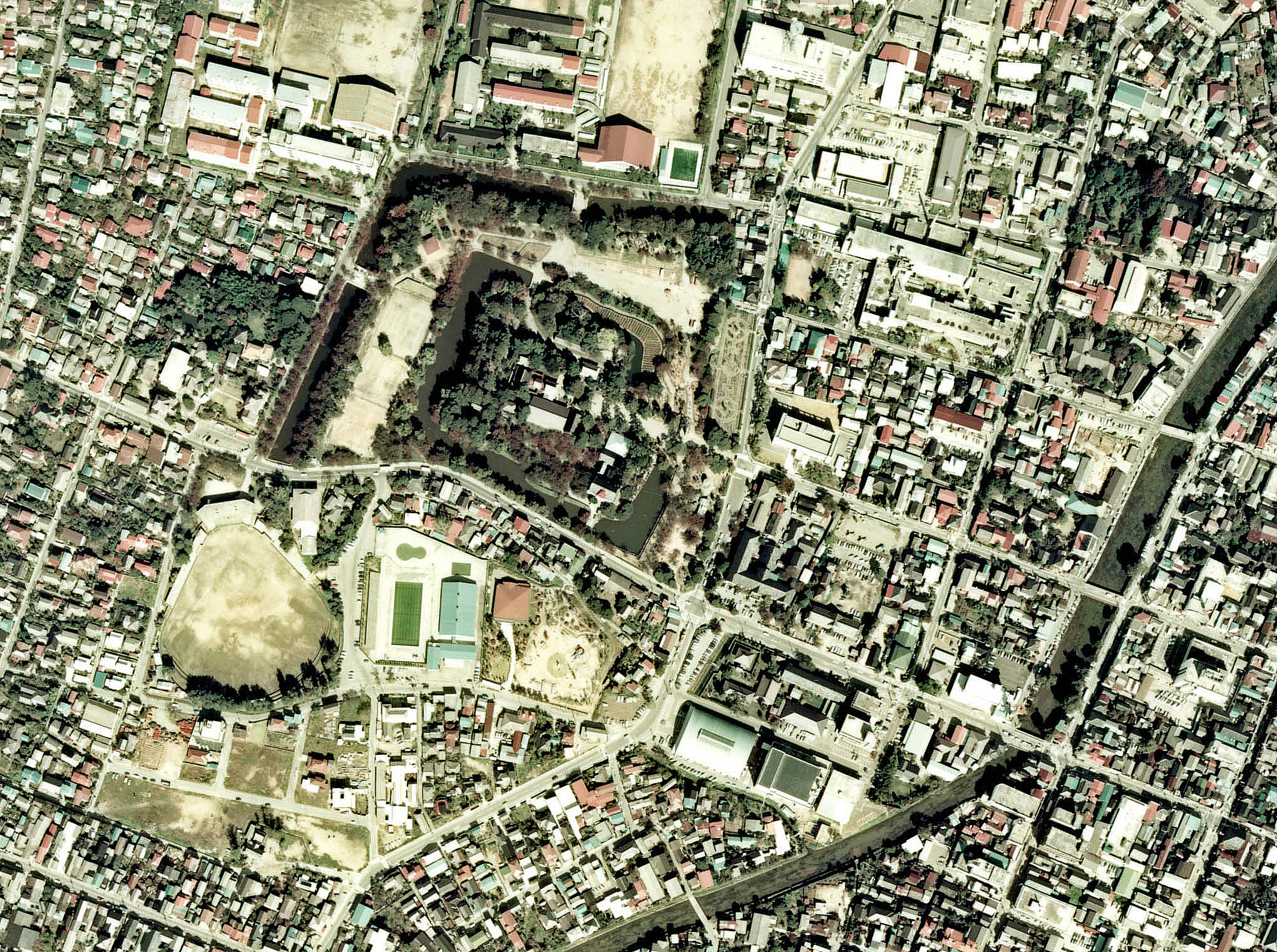

Tsurugaoka Castle (鶴ヶ岡城, Tsurugaoka-jō) is a flatland-style Japanese castle constructed in early Edo period in the city of Tsuruoka, Yamagata. It was the seat of the Sakai clan, a fudai daimyō clan who ruled over Shōnai Domain, Dewa Province in the Tōhoku region of northern Japan under the Tokugawa shogunate.

== Location ==
The castle is located in the center of Tsuruoka city in the southern portion of the Shōnai plain between the Mogami River and the Sea of Japan. The area was a major commercial center and was located in a large rice growing area, with riverine connections to inland portions of Dewa Province, and the kitamaebune coastal trading network. It was also junction for roads from Echigo province with the Yamagata plain and Shinjō basin.

== History ==
Tsurugaoka Castle was originally called Daihōji Castle, and was built the seat of the Daihōji clan in 13th century. The Daihōji were retainers of the Kamakura shogunate who came to the Shōnai region as a local governor, and became a regional warlord after the start of the Muromachi period. However, by the Sengoku period, the clan had been severely weakened by internal disputes and relocated their residence to the more secure Oura Castle in mountains five kilometers to the north. From 1570 Daihōji Yoshiyuki (1551-1583) began an aggressive campaign to recover lost territories with the assistance of the Honjō clan, who were retainers of the Uesugi. However, after the Honjō withdrew their support, he was assassinated by one of his retainers and the Daihōji territory was soon overrun by Mogami Yoshiaki. The Mogami were defeated at the Battle of Jūgorigahara in 1588 and the territory was conquered by the Uesugi; however, the Uesugi lost it back to the Mogami after the Battle of Sekigahara and the formation of the Tokugawa shogunate. Mogami Yoshiaki renovated the castle and renamed it Tsurugaoka Castle with the intent to use it as his retirement home in 1603. After his death, the Tokugawa shogunate dispossessed the Mogami clan of its holdings and transferred the Sakai clan to become daimyo of Shōnai.

The Sakai were descendants of Sakai Tadatsugu (1527-1596), a retainer of Tokugawa Ieyasu. The castle was further expanded under their tenure, which lasted until the Meiji restoration of 1868.

== Structure ==
The defenses of Tsurugaoka Castle consisted of three concentric square-shaped enclosures surrounding clay ramparts and wet moats. As with other castles in the Tōhoku region, although the castle makes extensive use of earthworks, stone walls were only used for the inner bailey. The central area is about 200 meters square, with a complex main gate at the southeast corner. The castle never had a tenshu, but a two-story yagura in the northwest corner was a substitute. Other corners of the central enclosure were guarded by single-story yagura, and a large palace for the lord covered much of the central area. The second bailey is a narrow area wholly surrounding central area, with a two-story yagura at southeast corner and three gates. The third bailey was much larger, covering the area between two rivers east and west of the castle, and containing residences of high-ranking retainers and the han school.

After the Meiji restoration, the castle was abolished and all its buildings were demolished. The third bailey was sold and subsequently covered by the urban expansion of Tsuruoka city, but the moats and clay walls of central and secondary area have kept much of their shape, and these areas contain a Shinto shrine, the Shōnai Shrine, and park. Tsuruoka Park has been selected as one of the "100 Cherry Blossom Spots in Japan". The han school has also survived as part of the Chidō Museum, and is a National Historic Site. The castle was listed as one of the Continued Top 100 Japanese Castles in 2017.

== Bibliography ==
- Benesch, Oleg and Ran Zwigenberg (2019). Japan's Castles: Citadels of Modernity in War and Peace. Cambridge: Cambridge University Press. p. 374. ISBN 9781108481946.
- De Lange, William (2021). An Encyclopedia of Japanese Castles. Groningen: Toyo Press. pp. 600 pages. ISBN 978-9492722300.
- Schmorleitz, Morton S. (1974). Castles in Japan. Tokyo: Charles E. Tuttle Co. pp. 144–145. ISBN 0-8048-1102-4.
- Motoo, Hinago (1986). Japanese Castles. Tokyo: Kodansha. p. 200 pages. ISBN 0-87011-766-1.
- Mitchelhill, Jennifer (2004). Castles of the Samurai: Power and Beauty. Tokyo: Kodansha. p. 112 pages. ISBN 4-7700-2954-3.
- Turnbull, Stephen (2003). Japanese Castles 1540–1640. Osprey Publishing. p. 64 pages. ISBN 1-84176-429-9.
- Mizoguchi, Akihiro: Tsurugaoka-jo in: Miura, Masayuki (Hrsg.): Shiro to jinya. Tokoku-hen. Gakken, 2006. ISBN 978-4-05-604378-5, S. 36.
