= Maeda Narinaga =

Japanese daimyō

- 前田 斉広
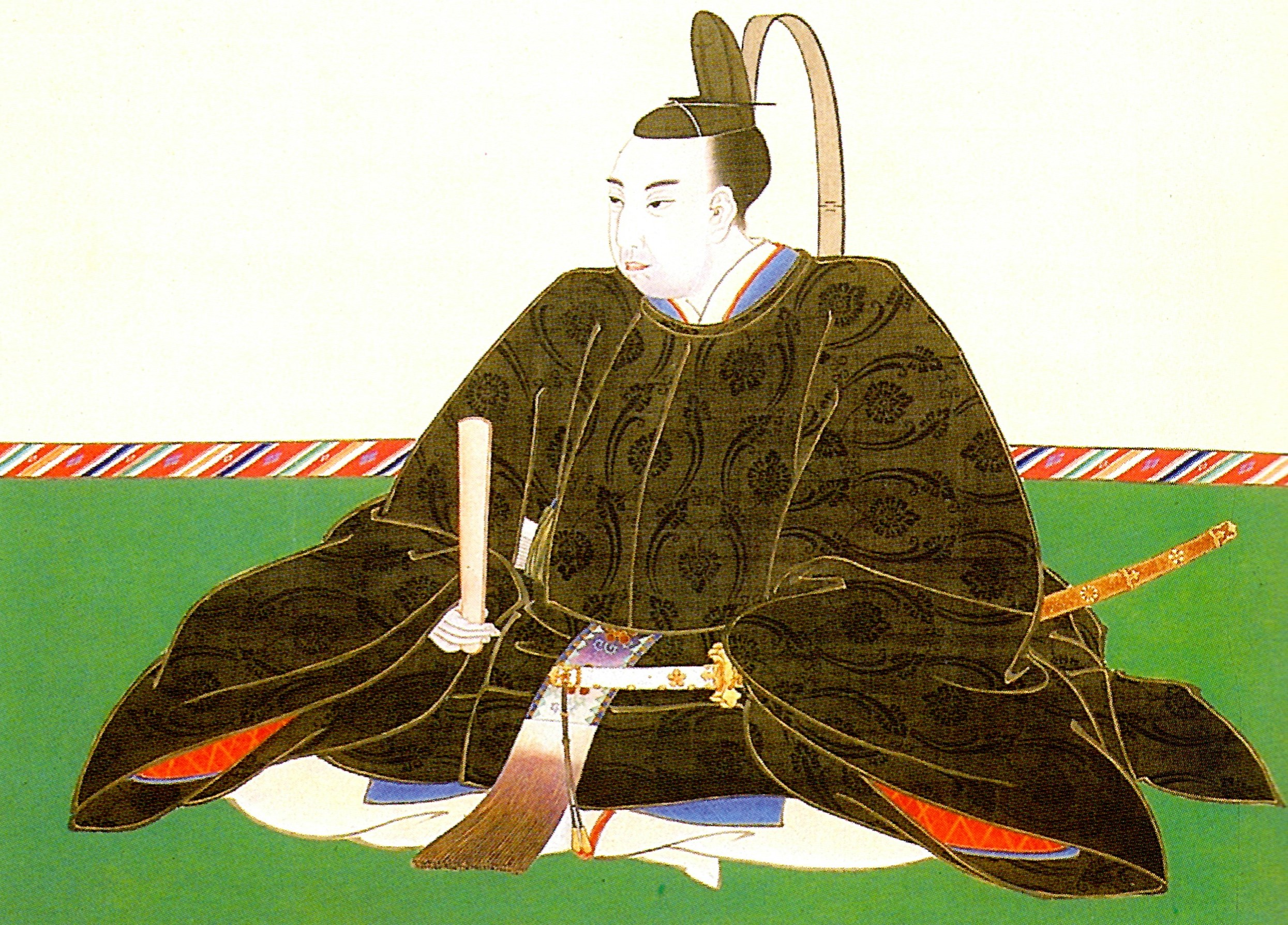

11th Daimyō of Kaga Domain
- In office 1802–1822
- Preceded by: Maeda Harunaga
- Succeeded by: Maeda Nariyasu

Personal details
- Born: September 5, 1782 Kanazawa, Japan
- Died: August 4, 1824 (aged 41)
- Spouse(s): Matsudaira Koto; later Takatsukasa Takako
- Parent: Maeda Shigemichi (father)

Maeda Narinaga (前田 斉広; September 5, 1782 – August 4, 1824) was an Edo period Japanese samurai, and the 11th daimyō of Kaga Domain in the Hokuriku region of Japan. He was the 12th hereditary chieftain of the Kanazawa Maeda clan.

Narinaga was born in Kanazawa as Kamemachi (亀万千) later Katsumaru (勝丸) and become Inuchiyo (犬千代), the second son of Maeda Shigemichi, after Shigemichi had retired from his position as daimyō. He was adopted by his uncle, Maeda Harunaga as heir in 1795, and was brought to Edo in 1796. In 1797, was received in formal audience by Shōgun Tokugawa Ienari in 1754 and was given a kanji from Ienari's name, thus becoming Maeda Narinaga. In 1802, Maeda Harunaga formally retired, and Narinaga officially became daimyō, although Harunaga continued to control the domain until his death in 1810.

Narinaga was initially married to an adopted daughter of Tokugawa Munechika of Owari Domain. He later remarried to a daughter of the Kampaku Takatsukasa Masahiro.

Narinaga attempted some half-hearted political reforms during his tenure, and turned the domain over to his son, Maeda Nariyasu in 1822. He died two years later in 1824 at the age of 43.

== Family ==
- Father: Maeda Shigemichi
- Mother: Tenrin’in
- Adopted Father: Maeda Harunaga
- Wives:
  - Matsudaira Kotohime, daughter of Matsudaira Yoshimasa
  - Takatsukasa Takako (1787-1870)
- Concubines:
  - Oyae no Kata later Eiyou’in
  - Tosei’in
  - Teisei’in
  - Osato no Kata later Gekkoin
- Children:
  - Naohime (1809-1825) betrothed to Ogasawara Tadaakira by Oyae no Kata
  - Maeda Nariyasu by Oyae no Kata
  - Atsuhime (1813-1852) married Matsudaira Katataka by Oyae no Kata
  - Yuuhime (1813-1875) married Maeda Toshinaka by Tosei’in
  - Hirohime (1815-1856) married Ogasawara Tadaakira by Oyae no Kata
  - Takamejiro (1817-1825) by Oyae no Kata
  - Ikuhime (1818-1829) betrothed to Takatsukasa Sukehiro by Oyae no Kata
  - Takahime (1818-1831) betrothed to Arima Yorito by Teisei’in
  - Suzuhime (1819-1835) married Honda Masaharu by Oyae no Kata
  - Tamesaburo (1819-1819) by Osato no Kata
  - Tsuguhime (1819-1823) (twins with suzuhime) by Oyae no Kata
  - Nobunosuke (1821-1834) by Oyae no Kata

| Preceded by Maeda Harunaga | 11th (Maeda) daimyō of Kaga; 1802–1822 | Succeeded by Maeda Nariyasu |
