= Aizu Domain =

Historical state of Japan

Aizu Domain 会津藩 Aizu-han
- Domain of Japan
- 1601–1869
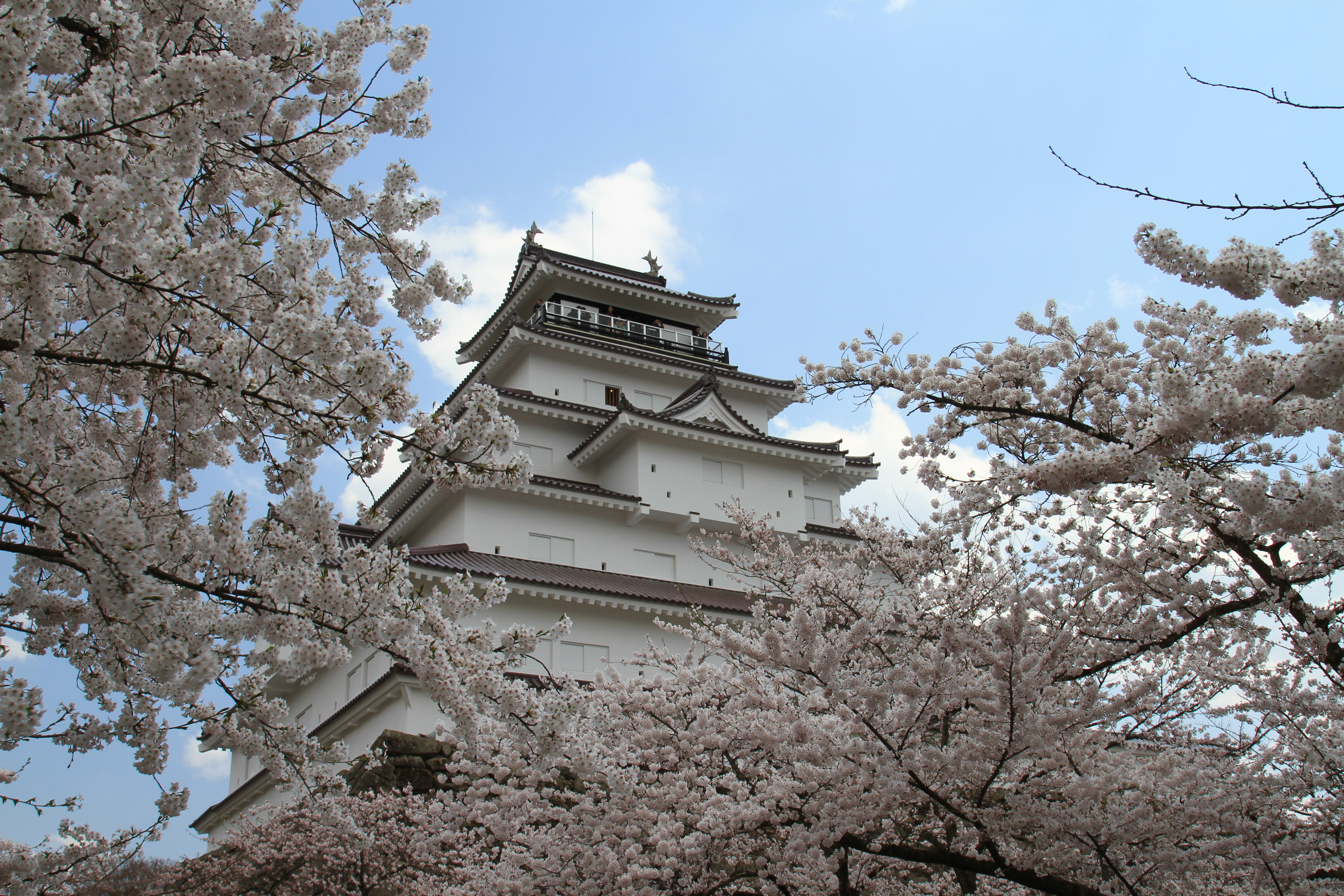
- Reconstructed Tsuruga Castle in Aizuwakamatsu

- Flag Mon of the Aizu-Matsudaira
- Capital: Tsuruga Castle
- Government
- Daimyō
  - 1601–1612: Gamō Hideyuki (first)
  - 1858–1868: Matsudaira Nobunori (last)
- Historical era: Edo period
  - Established: 1601
  - Abolished: 1869
- Contained within
  - Province: Mutsu
Preceded by	Succeeded by
Mutsu Province	Wakamatsu Prefecture
- Today part of: Fukushima Prefecture

Aizu Domain (会津藩, Aizu-han) was a domain of the Tokugawa Shogunate of Japan during the Edo period from 1601 to 1871.

The Aizu Domain was based at Tsuruga Castle in Mutsu Province, the core of the modern city of Aizuwakamatsu, located in the Tōhoku region of the island of Honshu. The Aizu Domain was ruled for most of its existence by the shinpan daimyō of the Aizu-Matsudaira clan, a local cadet branch of the ruling Tokugawa clan, but was briefly ruled by the tozama daimyō of the Gamō and Katō clans. The Aizu Domain was assessed under the Kokudaka system with a peak value of 919,000 koku, but this was reduced to 230,000 koku. The Aizu Domain was dissolved in the abolition of the han system in 1871 by the Meiji government and its territory was absorbed into Fukushima Prefecture, covering much of the traditional region of Aizu.

== History ==
=== Pre-Edo period ===
The area of Kurokawa, later called "Wakamatsu", was under the control of the powerful Buddhist temple of Enichi-ji during the Heian period. However, Enichi-ji sided with the Taira clan during the Genpei War and fell into decline after the victory of Minamoto no Yoritomo. He awarded the territory to the Ashina clan, a powerful local samurai clan, who ruled from the Kamakura period into the Muromachi period. However, in the wars of the Sengoku period, the Ashina were defeated by their powerful and aggressive neighbors to the north, the Date clan. In 1590, Toyotomi Hideyoshi awarded the Aizu Basin to Gamō Ujisato as part of a 919,000 koku fief following the submission of Date Masamune. Ujisato was succeeded by his son, Gamō Hideyuki, but he fell out of favor with Hideyoshi and was transferred to Utsunomi with a reduction in his holdings to only 180,000 koku. The Aizu Basin was then assigned to Uesugi Kagekatsu, who was ordered by Hideyoshi to relocate from his power base in Echigo Province.

=== Edo period ===
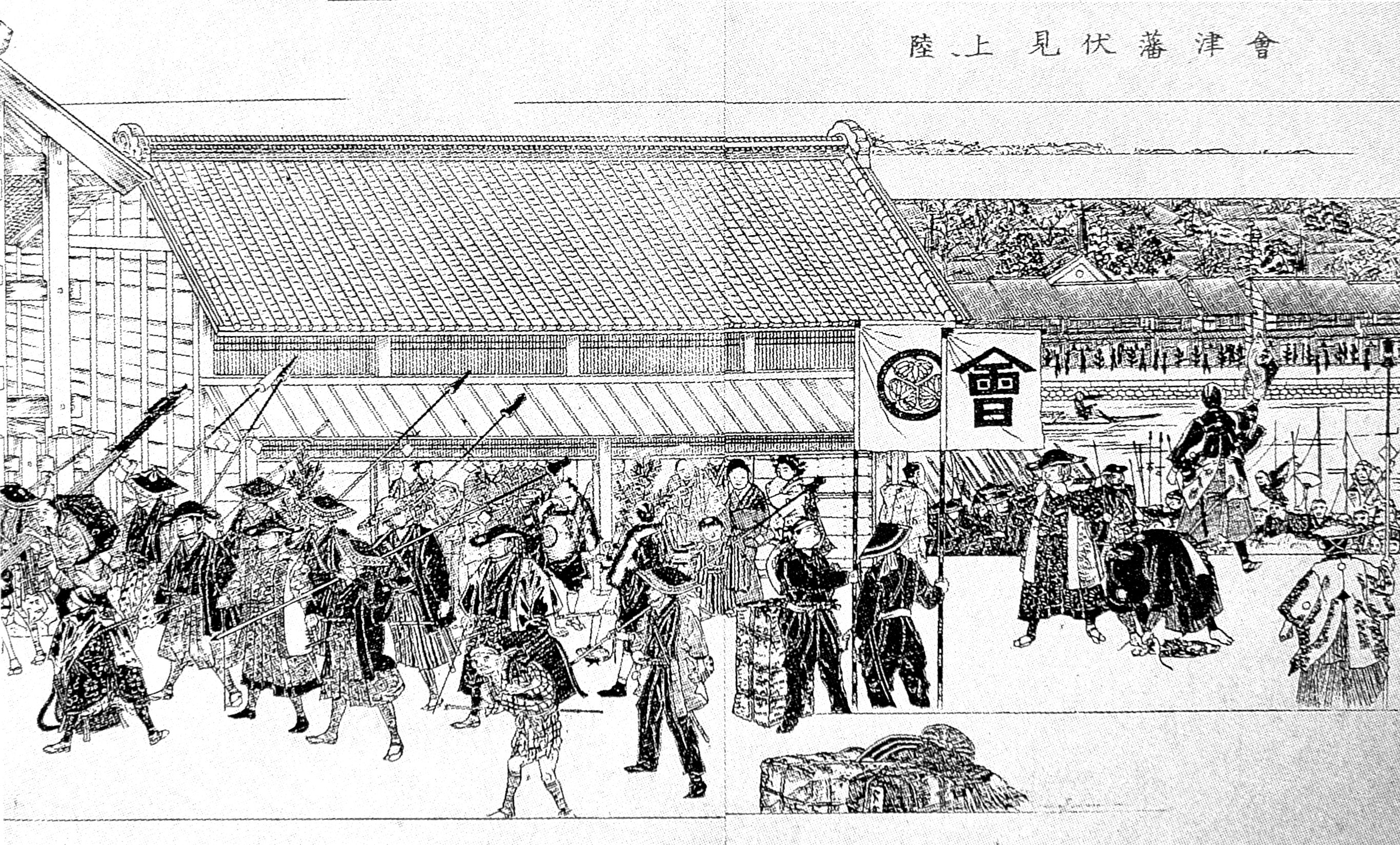
Aizu troops disembarking at Fushimi before the Battle of Toba–Fushimi

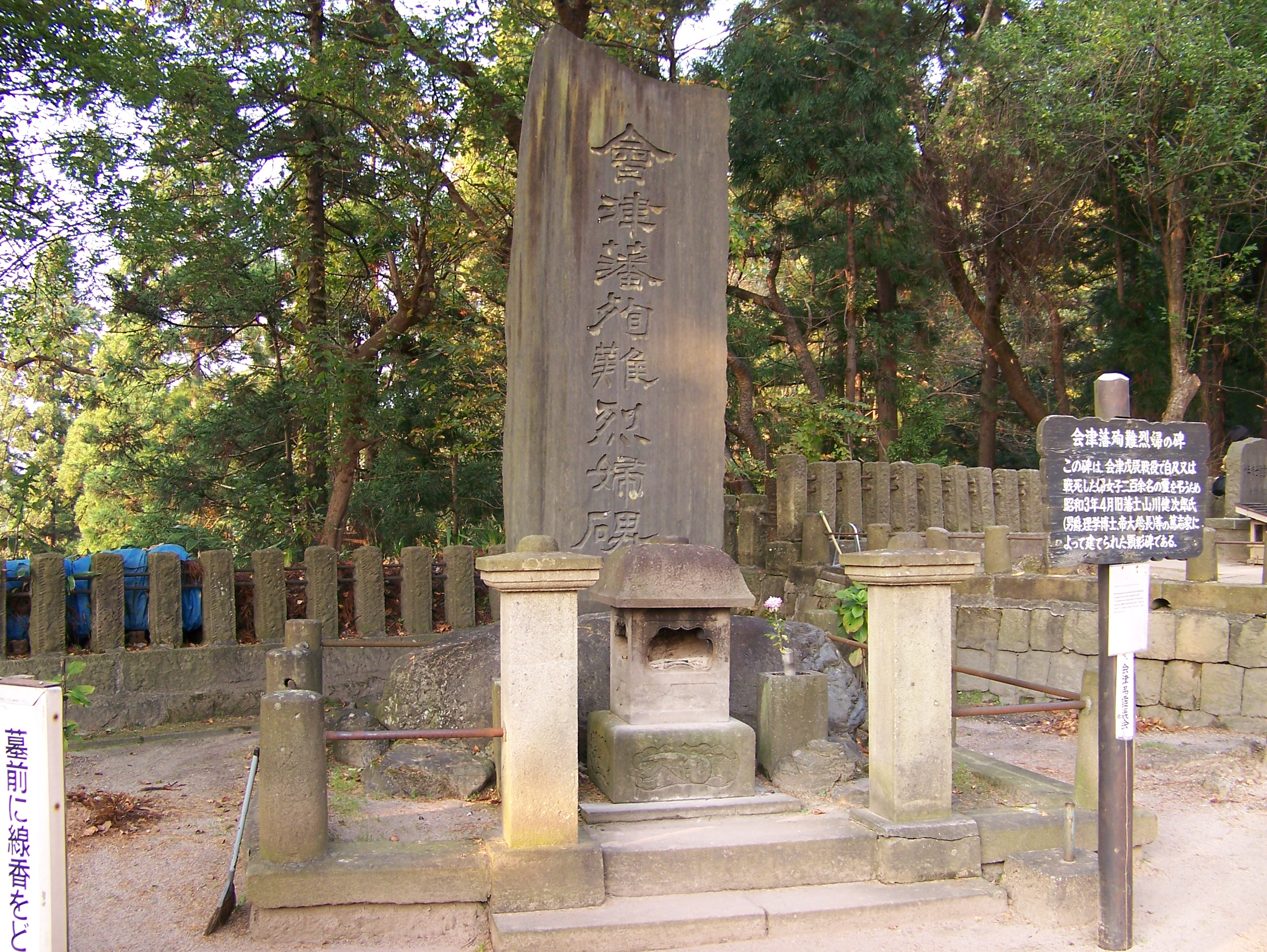
Monument to the Byakkotai Samurai

In 1600, after Tokugawa Ieyasu's victory at the Battle of Sekigahara, Uesugi Kagekatsu was deprived of his holdings in Aizu and was reassigned to the much smaller Yonezawa Domain in Dewa Province. The Aizu holding was reduced in half, and 600,000 koku was returned to Ieyasu's son-in-law, Gamō Hideyuki. However, the death of his son, Gamō Hidesato, in 1627 without a direct male heir provided an excuse for the Tokugawa shogunate to order the clan trade places with the Katō clan of the Matsuyama Domain in Iyo Province. The Gamō were replaced by Katō Yoshiaki, but reduced to 200,000 koku. His son, Katō Akinari was dispossessed due to an O-Ie Sōdō (clan dispute) in 1643.

The Aizu Domain was then given to Hoshina Masayuki, the illegitimate son of the second Tokugawa shōgun Tokugawa Hidetada. Masayuki had been adopted into the Hoshina clan, who had formerly been senior retainers of the Takeda clan and who were daimyō of the 30,000 koku Takatō Domain in Shinano Province. Masayuki was a senior advisor to third Tokugawa shōgun, Tokugawa Iemitsu, and was transferred to the 200,000 koku Yamagata Domain in 1636. When Aizu Domain became vacant in 1643, Masayuki was transferred to that holding, whose official kokudaka was raised to 240,000 koku. The actual kokudaka of the domain was perhaps double this, as management of all of the tenryō (directly shogunate owned) holdings within the Aizu region were assigned to Aizu Domain. Masayuki later acted as a regent for Iemitsu's successor, the underage fourth shōgun Tokugawa Ietsuna. Masayuki was offered the use of the Tokugawa mon and the Matsudaira surname, though he declined, partly out of respect and partly to emphasize that he had no ambitions towards being regarded as part of legitimate Tokugawa line of succession. However, the Matsudaira name and the Tokugawa symbols were later adopted from the time of the 3rd daimyō Matsudaira Masakata and were used by his descendents that ruled the Aizu Domain.

In 1822, the Hoshina-Matsudaira line became extinct with the death of the seventh daimyō, the 15-year-old Matsudaira Katahiro, and was succeeded by Matsudaira Katataka, who was a sixth cousin (twice removed) and a member of the Takasu cadet branch of the Mito-Tokugawa collateral line. Katataka died without heirs in 1852 and was succeeded by his grandnephew, the famous Matsudaira Katamori, one of the final supporters of the Tokugawa Shogunate.

The Aizu Domain was known for its martial skill, and maintained a standing army of over 5000 men. It was often deployed to security operations on the northern fringes of Japan, at the time a frontier region, as far north as southern Sakhalin. The Aizu Domain's two sets of formal rules for its army, the Rules for Commanders (将長禁令 shōchō kinrei) and Rules for Soldiers (士卒禁令 shisotsu kinrei), written in the 1790s, laid down a professional, modern standard for military conduct and operations, including the following two items in the Rules for Soldiers which codified the human rights and protection of enemy noncombatants, over 70 years before the first Geneva Convention of 1864:

Emblem of Aizu Domain's infantry at end of Edo period.

- 敵地といえども猥りに田畑を踏荒らすべからざる事。

"Regardless of whether it belongs to the enemy, trampling and ruining rice fields is forbidden."

- 敵地に入って、婦女を犯し、老幼を害し、墳墓を荒らし、民家を焼き、猥りに畜類を殺し、米金を掠取り、故なく林木を伐り、作毛を刈取べからざる事。

"In enemy territory, it is forbidden to rape women, harm the elderly and children, desecrate graves, torch the homes of commoners, slaughter livestock needlessly, pillage money and rice, cut trees without reason, and steal crops in the field."

Around the time of the Perry Expedition, Aizu had a presence in security operations around Edo Bay. During the Bakumatsu period, the domain deployed massive amounts of troops to Kyoto, where Katamori served as Kyoto Shugoshoku. Operating under the orders of the Shogunate, they also acted as the first official supervisor and patron of the Shinsengumi. Earning the enmity of the Chōshū Domain, and alienating the Satsuma Domain, Katamori retreated to Edo with the final shōgun Tokugawa Yoshinobu in 1868 at the start of the Boshin War. Following Yoshinobu's resignation, Katamori took great pains to avoid conflict with the new Meiji government which could only be averted by an equitable settlement with the Tokugawa clan. However, the new government was filled with anti-Tokugawa clansmen from the Satsuma and Chōshū domains, who sought to settle old scores. During the Boshin War, Aizu fought as an ally of the Ōuetsu Reppan Dōmei, although it was not an official member. In October 1868, Aizuwakamatsu Castle, the seat of the Aizu Domain, eventually fell during the Battle of Aizu. Although branded as an "enemy of the Court", Matsudaira Katamori was placed under house arrest and was later allowed to serve as the head kannushi for the Nikkō Tōshō-gū shrines to the Tokugawa clan. The Aizu Domain was assigned by the Meiji government to Sakai Tadamichi, formerly of the Shonai Domain, as the Imperial Governor from 1868 to 1869. After the abolition of the han system, the Aizu Domain was absorbed into the new Iwashiro Province, and subsequently into Fukushima Prefecture.

== List of daimyō ==
#	Name	Tenure	Courtesy title	Court Rank	kokudaka
Gamō clan, 1601–1627 (tozama)
1	Gamō Hideyuki ((蒲生 秀行)	1601–1612	Sangi / Jijū	Senior 3rd (従三位)	919,000 koku
2	Gamō Tadatoshi (蒲生忠郷)	1612–1627	Sangi / Jijū	Senior 3rd (従三位)	600,000 koku
Katō clan, 1627–1643 (tozama)
1	Katō Yoshiaki (加藤嘉明)	1627–1631	Sama-no-suke / Jijū	Senior 4th Rank, Lower Grade (正四位下)	400,000 koku
2	Katō Akinari (加藤明成)	1631–1643	Shikibu-Shōbu / Jijū	Junior 4th Rank, Lower Grade (従四位下)	400,000 koku
Hoshina clan / Aizu-Matsudaira clan, 1643–1868 (shinpan)
1	Hoshina Masayuki (保科正之)	1643–1669	Sakonoegonchūjō / Higo-no-kami	Senior 4th Rank, Lower Grade (正四位下)	230,000 koku
2	Hoshina Masatsune (保科正経)	1669–1681	Chikuzen-no-kami / Jijū	Junior 4th Rank, Lower Grade (従四位下)	230,000 koku
3	Matsudaira Masakata (松平正容)	1681–1731	Higo-no-kami/Sakonoegonchūjō	Senior 4th Rank, Lower Grade (正四位下)	230,000 koku
4	Matsudaira Katasada (松平容貞)	1731–1750	Higo-no-kami/Sakonoegonshōshō	Junior 4th Rank, Lower Grade (従四位下)	230,000 koku
5	Matsudaira Katanobu (松平容頌)	1750–1805	Higo-no-kami/Sakonoegonchūjō	Senior 4th Rank, Lower Grade (正四位下)	230,000 koku
6	Matsudaira Kataoki (松平容住)	1805	Higo-no-kami	Senior 4th Rank, Lower Grade (正四位下)	230,000 koku
7	Matsudaira Katahiro (松平容衆)	1806–1822	Higo-no-kami/Sakonoegonshōshō	Junior 4th Rank, Lower Grade (従四位下)	230,000 koku
8	Matsudaira Katataka (松平容敬)	1822–1852	Higo-no-kami/Sakonoegonchūjō	Senior 4th Rank, Lower Grade (正四位下)	230,000 koku
9	Matsudaira Katamori (松平容保)	1852–1868	Higo-no-kami/ Sangi	Senior 3rd (正三位)	230,000 ->280,000 koku
10	Matsudaira Nobunori (松平喜徳)	1868–1891	Wakasa-no-kami, Jijū	Junior 4th Rank, Lower Grade (従四位下)	280,000 -> 30,000 koku

=== Genealogy (Hoshina-Matsudaira line) ===
- Tokugawa Ieyasu, 1st Tokugawa Shōgun (1543–1616; r. 1603–1605)
  - Tokugawa Hidetada, 2nd Tokugawa Shōgun (1579–1632; r. 1605–1623)
    - I. Hoshina Masayuki, 1st daimyō of Aizu (cr. 1643) (1611–1673; r. 1643–1669)
      - II. Hoshina Masatsune, 2nd daimyō of Aizu (1647–1681; r. 1669–1681)
      - III. Matsudaira Masakata, 3rd daimyō of Aizu (1669–1731; r. 1681–1731)
        - IV. Katasada, 4th daimyō of Aizu (1724–1750; r. 1731–1750)
          - V. Katanobu, 5th daimyō of Aizu (1744–1805; r. 1750–1805)
        - Hirofumi
          - Kataaki (1750–1785)
            - VI. Kataoki, 6th daimyō of Aizu (1779–1806; r. 1805)
              - VII. Katahiro, 7th daimyō of Aizu (1803–1822; r. 1806–1822)
  - Tokugawa Yorifusa, 1st daimyō of Mito (1603–1661)
    - Yorishige, 1st daimyō of Takamatsu (1622–1695)
      - Yoritoshi (1661–1687)
        - Yoritoyo, 3rd daimyō of Takamatsu (1680–1735)
          - Tokugawa Munetaka, 4th daimyō of Mito (1705–1730)
            - Tokugawa Munemoto, 5th daimyō of Mito (1728–1766)
              - Tokugawa Harumori, 6th daimyō of Mito (1751–1805)
                - Tokugawa Harutoshi, 7th daimyō of Mito (1773–1816)
                  - Tokugawa Nariaki, 9th daimyō of Mito (1800–1860)
                    - X. Nobunori, 10th daimyō of Aizu, 10th family head, Viscount (1855–1891; Lord: 1868; Viscount: cr. 1884)
                - Yoshikazu, 9th daimyō of Takasu (1776–1832)
                  - Yoshitatsu, 10th Lo daimyōd of Takasu (1800–1862)
                    - IX. Katamori, 9th daimyō of Aizu (1836–1893; r. 1852–1868)
                      - Kataharu, 11th family head, 1st Viscount (1869–1910; 11th family head: 1869–1910; Viscount: cr. 1884)
                      - Rear-Admiral Morio, 12th family head, 2nd Viscount (1878–1944; 12th family head and 2nd Viscount: 1910–1944)
                        - Moritei, 13th family head, 3rd Viscount (1926–2011; 13th family head: 1944–2011; 3rd Viscount: 1944–1947)
                          - Yasuhisa, 14th family head (b. 1954; 14th family head: 2011– )
                  - VIII. Katataka, 8th daimyō of Aizu (1806–1852; r. 1822–1852)

== Bakumatsu period holdings ==
Unlike with most domains in the han system, Aizu Domain consisted of a continuous territory calculated to provide the assigned kokudaka, based on periodic cadastral surveys and projected agricultural yields. At the end of the Tokugawa shogunate, the domain consisted of the following holdings:

- Mutsu Province (Iwashiro Province)
  - 181 villages in Kawanuma District (+67 tenryō villages)
  - 309 villages in Aizu District
  - 57 villages in Ōnuma District (+104 tenryō villages)
  - 242 villages in Yama District (+68 tenryō villages)
  - 11 villages in Asaka District
- Shimotsuke Province
  - 6 villages in Shioya District
- Echigo Province
  - 157 villages in Uonuma District (+79 tenryō villages)
  - 4 villages in Santō District
  - 211 villages in Kanbara District
  - 59 villages in Iwafune District
- Ezo
  - Nemuro Province
  - Kitami Province

== See also ==
- List of Han
- Ōuetsu Reppan Dōmei
