= Harada Munetoki =

Japanese samurai

Harada Munetoki (原田 宗時, 1565–1593) was a Japanese samurai of the Sengoku period and Azuchi-Momoyama period. Also known as Samanosuke (左馬之助). Served as a retainer to Date Masamune. Born the son of Yamamine Genichiro, Munetoki succeeded his uncle Harada Munemasa, who had been killed in battle. The Harada family were hereditary retainers of the Date clan, from the days of the first lord Date Tomomune onward.

Munetoki soon entered the service of Date Masamune, and received Masamune's trust due to his valiant conduct in combat. At age 18 he was placed in charge of the Date clan's military affairs. He was easily visible in combat by his trademark golden sword, which measured 2.7 metres. One battle where Munetoki earned great distinction was the Battle of Suriage-ga-hara, where he commanded the detached unit and was able to take Hibara.

In 1593, Munetoki joined Masamune when the latter deployed to Korea. However, he fell ill at Pusan and despite his wishes to remain and fight, he was put on a ship bound for Hizen-Nagoya. His condition worsened en route, necessitating his disembarkation at Tsushima. He died in Tsushima later that same year. Masamune was so saddened by the untimely loss of Munetoki that he composed the set of poems titled Kokufū Rokushu (国風六首) The first letters of each of these poems formed an acrostic which spelled Na-mu-a-mi-da-bu (Namu Amida Butsu, an invocation to the Amida Buddha).
