= Matsudaira Masakata =

3rd Daimyo of Azu Domain

- 松平正容
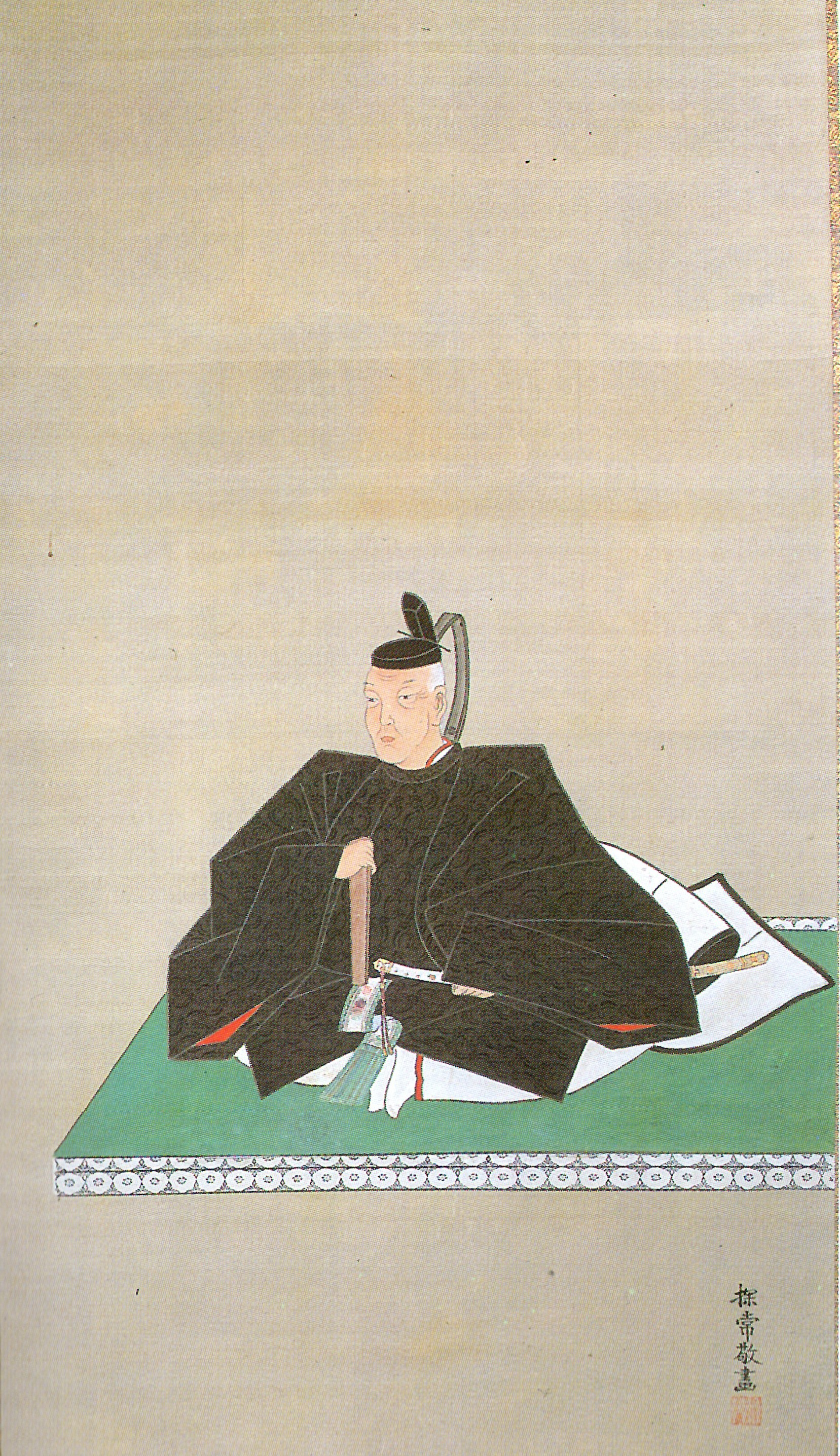
- Matsudaira Masakata portrait at Hanitsu Jinja, Inawashiro, Fukushima

3rd Daimyō of Aizu Domain
- In office 1681–1731
- Monarchs: Shōgun: Tokugawa Tsunayoshi; Tokugawa Ienobu; Tokugawa Ietsugu; Tokugawa Yoshimune
- Preceded by: Hoshina Masatsune
- Succeeded by: Matsudaira Masasada

Personal details
- Born: March 1, 1669
- Died: October 10, 1731 (aged 62)
- Spouse(s): Take, daughter of Abe Masatake of Oshi Domain
- Parent: Hoshina Masayuki (father)

Matsudaira Masakata (松平正容; March 1, 1669 – October 10, 1731) was the 3rd daimyō of Aizu Domain in Mutsu Province, Japan (modern-day Fukushima Prefecture). His courtesy title was Sankonoe-gon-chū-shō and Jijū, and his Court rank was Senior Fourth Rank, Lower Grade.

== Biography ==
Matsudaira Masakata was the sixth son of Hoshina Masayuki and became daimyō in 1681 on the retirement of his elder brother. His courtesy title was Bungo-no-kami, which was increased to Sankonoe-gon-shō-shō in 1687. Initially, his name was Hoshina Masanobu (保科正信), but in 1696 he was permitted to change his name to Matsudaira Masakata, in recognition of the clan's status of being a cadet branch of the Tokugawa clan. His courtesy title was promoted to Sankonoe-gon-chū-shō in 1712. He was married to a daughter of Abe Masatake of Oshi Domain, and had nine sons and four daughters. He ruled to his death in 1731.

== See also ==
- Hoshina clan
