= Hoshina =

Hoshina (written: 保科) is a Japanese surname. Notable people with the surname include:

- Hoshina Chikanori (保科 近野里, 1830–1903), adopted name of Saigō Tanomo
- Hoshina Masaari (保科 正益, 1833–1888), Japanese daimyō
- Hoshina Masakage (保科 正景, 1616–1700), Japanese daimyō
- Hoshina Masamitsu (保科 正光, 1561–1631), Japanese daimyō
- Hoshina Masanao (保科 正直, 1542–1601), Japanese daimyō
- Hoshina Masasada (保科 正貞, 1588–1661), Japanese daimyō
- Hoshina Masatoshi (保科 正俊, 1509–1593), Japanese samurai
- Hoshina Masatsune (保科 正経, 1647–1681), Japanese daimyō
- Hoshina Masayuki (保科 正之, 1611–1673), Japanese daimyō
- Tomohiko Hoshina (智彦 保科, born 1987), Filipino-Japanese judoka
- Zenshiro Hoshina (保科善四郎, 1891–1991), Japanese naval officer

== Fictional characters ==
- Hoshina (ホシイナー), a species of monsters in the anime series Yes! PreCure 5 GoGo!
- Hikaru Hoshina (星奈ひかる) (a.k.a Cure Star), the protagonist of the 2019 anime series Star Twinkle PreCure
  - Terumi and Youichi Hoshina, Hikaru's parents
  - Harukichi and Youko Hoshina, Hikaru's grandparents
- Soshiro Hoshina (保科 宗四郎), a supporting character in the manga and anime Kaiju No. 8
- Subaru Hoshina (保科 昴), a supporting character in the manga and anime The Fragrant Flower Blooms with Dignity
- Utau Hoshina (ほしな 歌唄), a character in the manga series Shugo Chara!
  - Kazuomi Hoshina, Utau's stepfather

== See also ==
- Hoshina clan (保科氏, Hoshina-shi), a Japanese clan
