= Mibu Castle =

Castle in Japan

Coordinates: 36°25′37.09″N 139°48′07.74″E

Mibu Castle 壬生城
- Mibu, Tochigi Prefecture, Japan
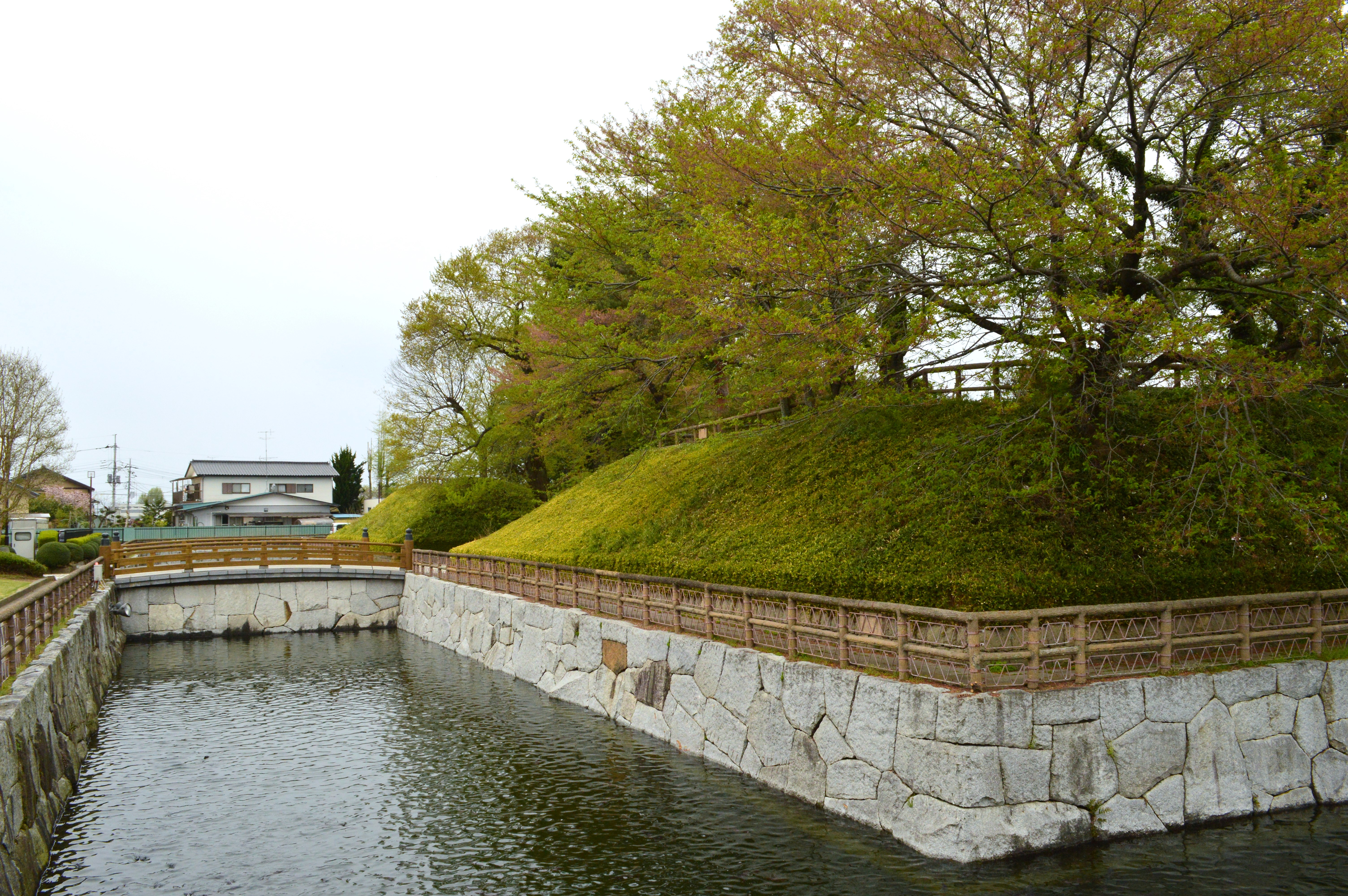
- Reconstructed moats of Mibu Castle

Site information
- Type: flatland-style Japanese castle
- Open to the public: yes

Location

Site history
- Built: 1469-1489
- Built by: Mibu Tsunashige
- In use: Edo period
- Demolished: 1867

Mibu Castle (壬生城, Mibu-jō) is a Japanese castle located in Mibu, southern Tochigi Prefecture, Japan. At the end of the Edo period, Mibu Castle was home to a branch of the Torii clan, daimyō of Mibu Domain.

== History ==
The Mibu clan was a branch of the Otsuku clan (小槻氏), a kuge clan claiming descent from the semi-legendary Emperor Suinin. The Mibu rose took prominence in the area which is now part of Mibu and Kanuma from the late Heian period. During the Sengoku period, the Mibu were vassals of the Utsunomiya clan. Mibu Tsunashige built the first Mibu Castle during the Bunmei era (1469-1489). However, the Mibu clan were destroyed along with their overlords by Toyotomi Hideyoshi during the Battle of Odawara in 1590 and their lands were part of domains given subsequently to Tokugawa Ieyasu.

Under the Tokugawa shogunate, Mibu Castle was the center of Mibu Domain, which was awarded to a number of clans in quick succession until it came into the hands of Torii Tadateru in 1712. The Torii clan ruled as daimyō of the 30,000 koku Mibu Domain until the Meiji restoration.

During the Boshin War, Mibu sided with the Imperial cause. The castle was successfully defended by samurai from Satsuma Domain when it came under attack by the pro-Shogunal forces of Ōtori Keisuke and the Shinsengumi during the Battle of Utsunomiya Castle. Following the establishment of the Meiji government, the remaining castle structures were destroyed and the outer moats were filled in.

At present, the site of the castle is a public park containing a Shinto shrine and municipal library. A portion of the moat and ramparts still exists, and one of the gates has been reconstructed from materials recovered from local farm houses.

== Design ==
Mibu Castle lacked a donjon or yagura, and had two sets of concentric moats with earthen ramparts. In the center bailey was a palace used by the daimyo as their residence and administrative center. The palace was also used by the early Tokugawa shōgun as a resting place on their way to worship at the Nikkō Tōshō-gū complex, as Mibu was located on the Nikkō Kaidō.

== Literature ==
- Schmorleitz, Morton S. (1974). Castles in Japan. Tokyo: Charles E. Tuttle Co. pp. 144–145. ISBN 0-8048-1102-4.
- Motoo, Hinago (1986). Japanese Castles. Tokyo: Kodansha. p. 200 pages. ISBN 0-87011-766-1.
- Mitchelhill, Jennifer (2004). Castles of the Samurai: Power and Beauty. Tokyo: Kodansha. p. 112 pages. ISBN 4-7700-2954-3.
- Turnbull, Stephen (2003). Japanese Castles 1540-1640. Osprey Publishing. p. 64 pages. ISBN 1-84176-429-9.
