= Takatō Castle =

Coordinates: 35.8332°N 138.0625°E

- 高遠城
- Ina, Nagano Prefecture, Japan
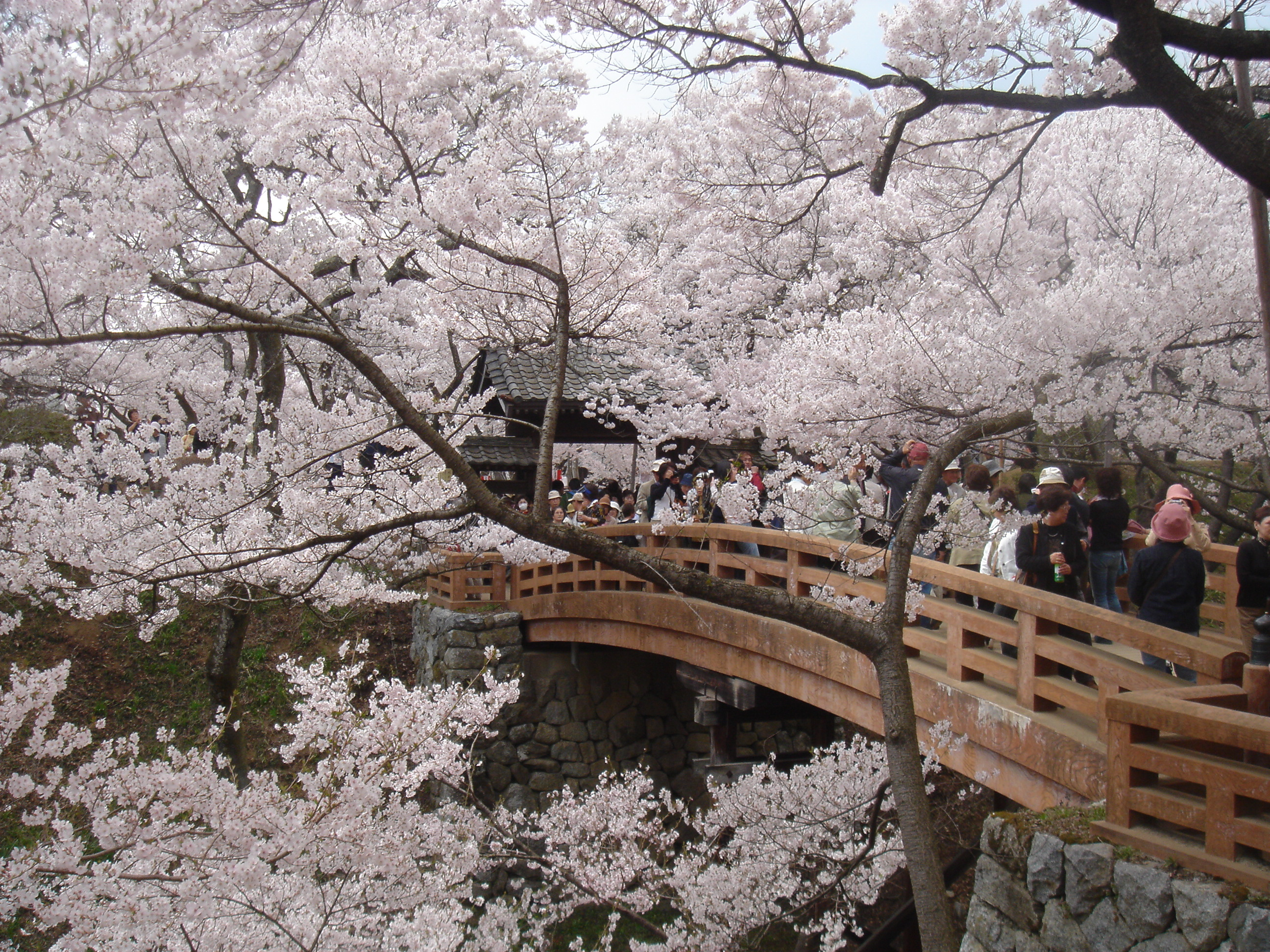

Site information
- Type: hirayama-style Japanese castle
- Open to the public: yes

Location

Site history
- Built: Sengoku period
- Built by: Takeda Shingen
- In use: Sengoku - Edo period
- Demolished: 1871

Takatō Castle (高遠城, Takatō-jō) is a Japanese castle located in the city of Ina, southern Nagano Prefecture, Japan. At the end of the Edo period, Takatō Castle was home to a cadet branch of the Naitō clan, daimyō of Takatō Domain. The castle was also known as Kabuto Castle (兜山城, Kabuto-jō). Built sometime in the 16th century, it is now largely in ruins.

== Layout ==
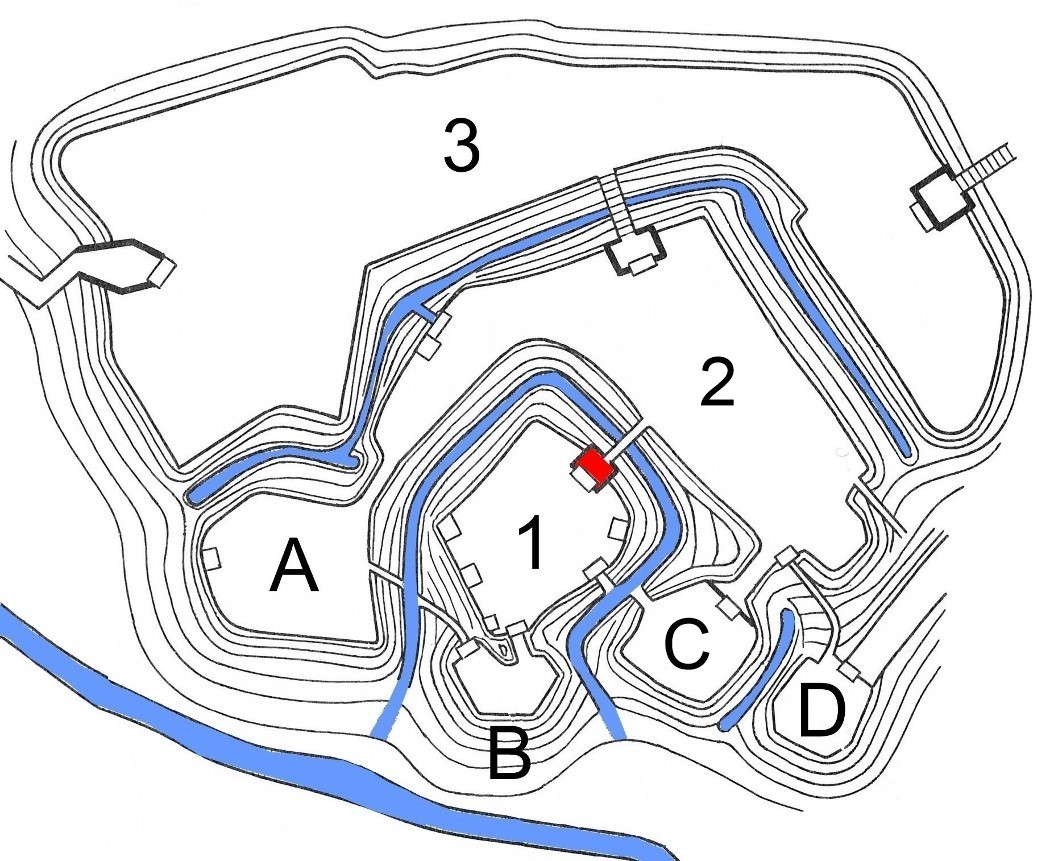
Plan of Takato Castle

Takato Castle is located on a hill in the former Takatō Town on the eastern edge of central Ina Valley in southern Nagano Prefecture. The location was a crossroads on the Akiba Kaidō, a highway connecting Tōtōmi province with the Suwa region of Shinano and Kai Province and a road which led to the western portion of the Ina valley and Mino Province. When viewed from the standpoint of Kai Province, the area was a key point in the control of southern Shinano. The castle site overlooks the confluence of the Mibugawa River and the Fujisawa River, which forms part of its natural defenses. Deep trenches, earthen ramparts and stone walls in concentric rings form the defensive structures in a style typical of construction under Takeda Shingen. The Central Bailey (Hon-maru) was protected to the northwest and northeast by the Second Bailey (Ni-no-maru) and Third Bailey (San-no-maru) along with four enclosures: the Suwa-kuruwa ( 諏訪曲輪 ), Sasa-kuruwa ( 笹曲輪 ), Minami-kuruwa ( 南曲輪 ) and Hōdōji-kuruwa ( 法幢寺曲輪 ). Most of the gates were box-shaped gates, which added to the defenses. In the Edo period, front gate of the castle was changed from east side to west side, which directly faced the jōkamachi. The han school, built in 1860, was located in the Third Bailey. A few samurai residences have survived in the town.

== History ==
The original date of construction of Takatō Castle is unknown, however before its construction, there was originally another fortification on the same site, controlled by the Takatō clan, retainers of the Suwa clan, who had dominated the area since the Kamakura period.

Suwa Yorishige had an alliance with the Takeda clan, but this was broken by Takeda Shingen in 1545 during his campaign to conquer southern Shinano Province and the castle was seized by Takeda forces. Takatō Yoritsugu relied on support from his allies, Ogasawara Nagatoki and Tozawa Yorichika, however, they failed to come to his aid. Under the Takeda clan, the castle was completely rebuilt in accordance with contemporary military design practices, with a layout developed by his military strategist, Yamamoto Kansuke, and Shingen awarded the castle to his retainer, Akiyama Nobutomo and later to his son, Takeda Katsuyori. Shingen used the castle to launch his invasion of Mino Province, which brought him into conflict with Oda Nobunaga, and it was also from Takatō Castle that he started his final campaign in 1572 towards Kyoto. After Shingen's death, the castle was entrusted to Nishina Morinobu, Takeda Katsuyori's younger brother.

The castle fell to Oda Nobutada, the son of Oda Nobunaga during the Battle of Temmokuzan in 1582, with 50,000 troops as opposed to 3000 defenders on the side of the Takeda clan, with Nishina Morinobu resisting to the end.

After the Takeda clan was destroyed, the castle was awarded to Mori Hideyori, one of Nobunaga’s generals. However, after the assassination of Nobunaga in the Honnō-ji incident, the area came under the control of Tokugawa Ieyasu, who assigned it to Hoshina Masanao. However, after the Tokugawa clan was reassigned to the Kantō region by Toyotomi Hideyoshi in 1590, Takatō was given to one of Hideyoshi’s generals, Ogasawara Sadayoshi. Tokugawa Ieyasu recovered the castle following the Battle of Sekigahara in 1603, and with the establishment of the Tokugawa shogunate, Takatō become the center of Takatō Domain, a 30,000 koku holding under the Hoshina clan. The Hoshina were replaced by the Torii clan from 1636-1689, until the assignment of the domain to Naitō Kiyokazu, whose descendants continued to rule to the Meiji restoration.

Following the establishment of the Meiji government and the abolition of the han system, the remaining structures of the castle were dismantled, and its surviving gates donated to nearby temples or were sold off to private owners. The castle site became the Takato Castle Ruins Park (高遠城址公園, Takatōjōshi Kōen), noted for its sakura blossoms in spring. The cherry blossoms were planted in the Meiji Period.

Takatō Castle was listed as one of the 100 Fine Castles of Japan by the Japan Castle Foundation in 2006.

== Current situation ==
Takatō Castle Ruins Park is regarded one of the three best locations to see cherry blossoms, together with Hirosaki Castle and Mount Yoshino. There is very little of the castle remaining in situ aside from part of the moats and stone ramparts. Several of the original castle gates have survived, but remain in private hands in other locations. One yagura has been reconstructed, and the Ōtemon (Main gate) of the castle, which had been moved to be used as the gate for a high school north of town, was relocated back to its original location in 1984. On the site of the castle, the oldest remaining building is the former han school, the Shintokukan (進徳館), built by the last daimyō of Takatō, Naitō Yorinao.

== See also ==
- List of Historic Sites of Japan (Nagano)

== Literature ==
- Takada, Toru: Takato-jō in: Miura, Masayuki (eds): Shiro to Jinya. Tokoku-hen. Gakken, 2006. ISBN 978-4-05-604378-5 , S. 100th
- Nishigaya, Yasuhiro (eds): Takato-jō. In: Nihon Meijo Zukan, Rikogaku-sha, 1993. ISBN 4-8445-3017-8 .
- Schmorleitz, Morton S. (1974). Castles in Japan. Tokyo: Charles E. Tuttle Co. pp. 144–145. ISBN 0-8048-1102-4.
- Motoo, Hinago (1986). Japanese Castles. Tokyo: Kodansha. p. 200 pages. ISBN 0-87011-766-1.
- Mitchelhill, Jennifer (2004). Castles of the Samurai: Power and Beauty. Tokyo: Kodansha. p. 112 pages. ISBN 4-7700-2954-3.
- Turnbull, Stephen (2003). Japanese Castles 1540-1640. Osprey Publishing. p. 64 pages. ISBN 1-84176-429-9.
