= Takatō =

Takatō may refer to:

- Takatō, Nagano, former town in Nagano Prefecture that was merged into the expanded city of Ina in 2006
- Takatō Domain, feudal domain with its capital at that town
- Takatō Castle, home of the lords of the domain
  - Siege of Takatō (1545)
  - Siege of Takatō (1582)

== People with the given name ==
- Ōki Takatō (大木 喬任, 1832–1899), Japanese statesman during the early Meiji period
- Ōshima Takatō (大島 高任, 1826–1901), Japanese engineer

== People with the surname ==
- Naohisa Takato (高藤 直寿, born 1993), Japanese judoka

== See also ==
- Takato Matsuki, a character in the anime series Digimon Tamers
