= Funai (disambiguation) =

Funai is a Japanese consumer electronics company.

Funai or FUNAI may also refer to:

== Places and jurisdictions ==
- Funai District, Kyoto, Japan
- Funai Domain, Edo-period domain in Bungo Province, Kyushu, Japan
  - Funai Castle, centre of Funai Domain
  - Diocese of Funai, Catholic diocese founded in 1588 in the domain (suppressed circa 1660; precursor of Otai)

== People with the surname ==
- Teruo Funai (born 1938), Japanese long-distance runner

== Other uses ==
- FUNAI (Fundação Nacional dos Povos Indígenas; National Indigenous People Foundation), a Brazilian governmental protection agency for indigenous Brazilian interests and culture
