= Torii Tadanori =

Japanese daimyō

Lord of Takatō
- In office 1663–1689
- Preceded by: Torii Tadaharu
- Succeeded by: Naitō Kiyokazu

Torii Tadanori (鳥居 忠則; 1646–1689) was a Japanese daimyō of the early Edo period who ruled the Takatō Domain in Shinano Province (modern-day Nagano Prefecture).

== History ==
Tadanori was the son of Torii Tadaharu, the previous lord. He succeeded to family headship upon his father's death; however, he continued his father's draconian rule of the Takatō domain.

=== Scandal and death ===
During the shogunate's investigation into a scandal involving Takatō retainer Takasaka Gonbei, Tadanori was ordered confined to Edo Castle; he committed suicide during his confinement. The Takatō domain was confiscated from the Torii family; however, as the Torii family was a famed fudai family dating back to Torii Mototada, Tadanori's heir Tadateru was granted four districts in Noto Province, and made the lord of the Shimomura Domain.

Preceded by Torii Tadaharu	Daimyō of Takatō; 1663–1689	Succeeded by Naitō Kiyokazu
Preceded by Torii Tadaharu	Torii family head 1663–1689	Succeeded by Torii Tadateru
