= List of diplomats of Japan to Hawaii =

Below is a List of Diplomats of Japan to Hawaii dealing with diplomatic representation in the Kingdom of Hawaii and its successor states the Provisional Government of Hawaii and the Republic of Hawaii before annexation to the United States in 1898.

== Japanese ambassadors to Hawaii ==
- J. B. Dickson; from November 1875, Acting Consul for Japanese Government
- J. D. Brewer; from November 1877, Acting Commercial Agent for Japanese Government
- Joseph O. Carter, appointed September 1880 to 1885
- Jiro Nakamura; from January 27, 1885
- Taro Ando; from February 14, 1886
- Torii Tadafumi; from December 3, 1889, acting consul
- Taizo Masaki; consul from May 22, 1890; elevated to consul-general on June 22, 1891 to 1892
- Saburo Fujii; from November 26, 1892 to 1894
- Goro Narita; from November 12, 1894; acting consul-general
- Seizaburō Shimizu; from January 10, 1895 to 1895; eleve consul
- Hisashi Shimamura; as consul-general from November 5, 1895 to 1897; he was appointed Resident Minister to Hawaii on April 1, 1897 to July 1898
- Shinzo Hirai, acting consul-general from July 13, 1898
- Miki Saito, acting consul-general from September 8, 1898 to 1902

Subsequent diplomatic agents represented Japanese interest in the American Territory of Hawaii.
