= Takatō Domain =

Estate of the Tokugawa Shogunate, Japan

Takatō Domain 高遠藩 Takatō-han
- Domain of Japan
- 1600–1871
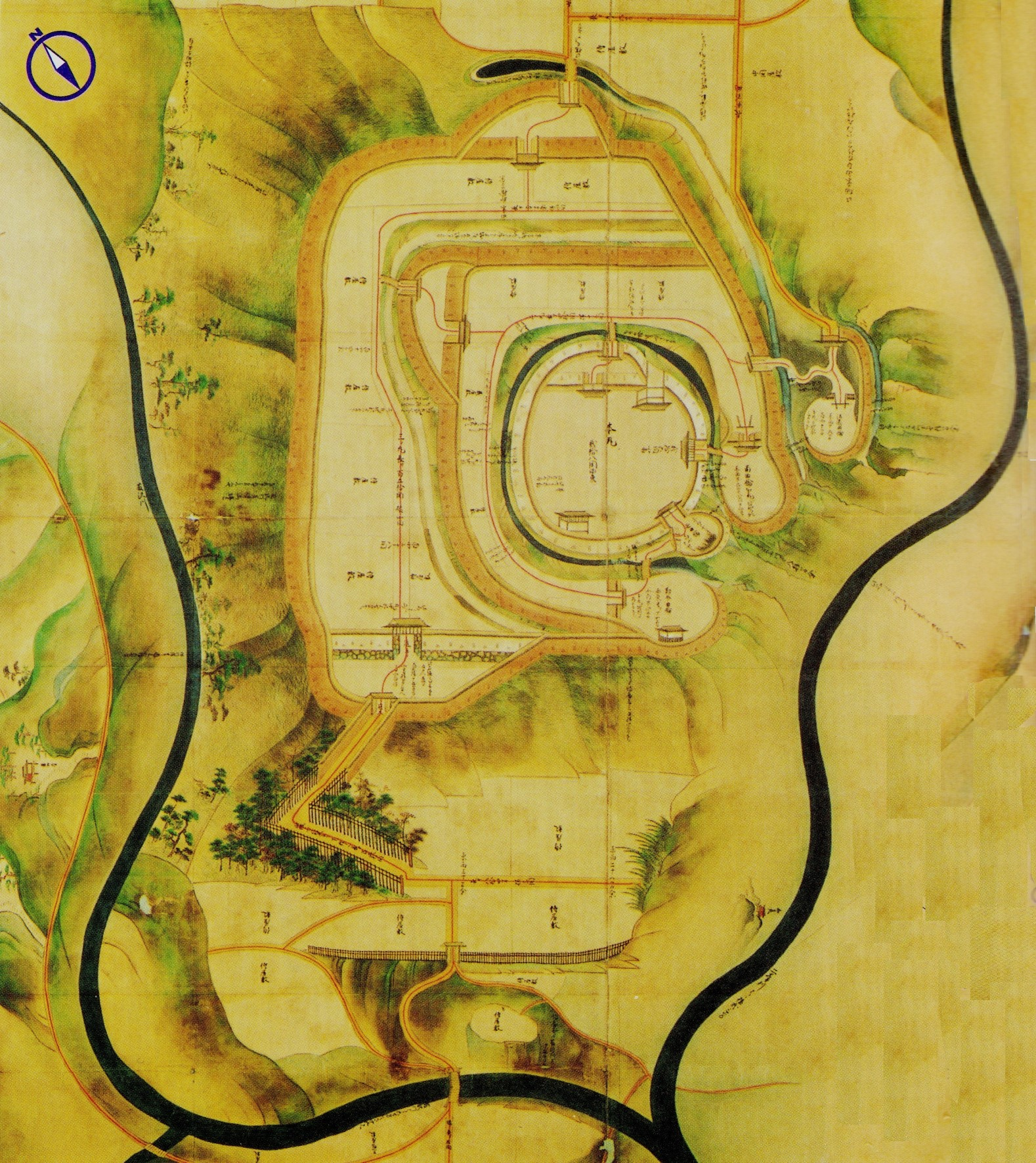
- Map of Takatō Castle

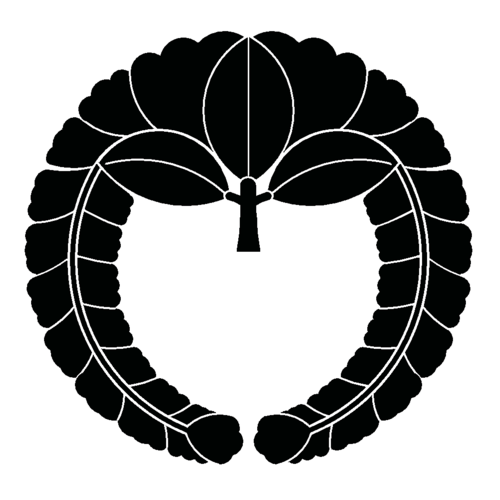
- Mon of the Naitō
- Capital: Takatō Castle
- Area
  - Coordinates: 35.8332°N 138.0625°E
- Government
- Daimyō
  - 1600–1631: Hoshina Masamitsu (first)
  - 1859–1871: Naitō Yorinao (last)
- Historical era: Edo period
  - Established: 1600
  - Disestablished: 1871
- Contained within
  - Province: Shinano
- Today part of: Nagano Prefecture

Takatō Domain (高遠藩, Takatō-han) was a domain of the Tokugawa Shogunate of Japan during the Edo period from 1600 to 1871.

The Takatō Domain was based at Takatō Castle in Shinano Province, in the modern city of Ina, located in the Chūbu region of the island of Honshu. The Takatō Domain was ruled by the fudai daimyō of the Hoshina clan from 1600 to 1636, the Torii clan from 1636 to 1689, and the Naitō clan from 1691 to 1871, with a Kokudaka value of 33,000 koku. The Takatō Domain was dissolved in the abolition of the han system in 1871 by the Meiji government and its territory was absorbed into Nagano Prefecture.

== History ==
The territory around Takatō was ruled during the Sengoku period by Takatō Yoritsugu (d. 1552). After his castle fell to Takeda Shingen in the Siege of Takatō in 1545, it was given over to one of Shingen's sons, Nishina Morinobu. Takatō then came under the control of Hoshina Masatoshi, a retainer of Tokugawa Ieyasu, following the defeat and subsequent destruction of the Takeda clan following the second Siege of Takatō in 1582.

Following the Battle of Sekigahara in 1600, and the establishment of the Tokugawa shogunate in 1603, Hoshina Masamitsu, the grandson of Masatoshi, became the first Edo period daimyō of Takatō, and the domain was officially ranked at a kokudaka of 25,000 koku. Masamitsu raised an illegitimate son of shōgun Tokugawa Hidetada as his own, under the name Hoshina Masayuki, and was rewarded with a 5,000 koku increase for his domain in 1618. Following Hidetada's death in 1632, Masayuki was transferred to Yamagata Domain in Dewa Province in 1636, with an income of 200,000 koku.

Torii Tadaharu, the third son of Torii Tadamasa of Yamagata Domain, replaced him as lord of Takatō, with an income of 32,000 koku. The next lord, Torii Tadanori, however, died while under house arrest due to a scandal at Edo in 1689, leaving the clan's succession in the hands of the shogunate. Tadanori's successor in the family, Torii Tadahide, was demoted to a 10,000 koku holding, Shimomura Domain in Noto Province. As a result, Takatō briefly became tenryō administered directly by the shogunate until 1691, when Naitō Kiyokazu was reassigned from Tondabayashi Domain in Settsu Province to Takatō. The domain began to have financial troubles beginning under the following lord, Naitō Yorinori, who made efforts at reforms and innovations to solve the problems. The Ejima-Ikushima affair occurred around the same time, resulting in the shogunal consort named Ejima, banished from Edo, being left in the custody of Takatō.

The seventh Naitō lord of Takatō, Naitō Yoriyasu, oversaw numerous development projects, including a trading market, a mulberry plantation operated directly by the domain, educational institutions and land intensification projects. These changes, however, brought numerous peasant revolts, and instability to the realm.

Towards the Bakumatsu period, the final daimyō, Naitō Yorinao, established a han school and took part in the campaigns by the shogunate against Chōshū Domain. During the 1868 Boshin War, however, Takatō sided with the newly founded Meiji government army against the last supporters of the shogunate and sent forces to fight in the Battle of Hokuetsu and the Battle of Aizu{

Naitō Yorinao remained governor of Takatō when the lands were formally handed over to the Emperor. In 1871, the domains were abolished, and Takatō became "Takatō Prefecture", only to be subsumed into Tsukama Prefecture and, eventually, into Nagano Prefecture, which remains today.

== Bakumatsu period holdings ==
As with most domains in the han system, Takatō Domain consisted of several discontinuous territories calculated to provide the assigned kokudaka, based on periodic cadastral surveys and projected agricultural yields.

- Shinano Province
  - 8 villages in Chikuma District
  - 80 villages in Ina District

== List of daimyō ==
#	Name	Tenure	Courtesy title	Court Rank	kokudaka	Notes
Hoshina clan (fudai) 1600–1636
1	Hoshina Masamitsu (保科正光)	1600–1631	Bungo-no-kami (肥後守)	Lower 5th (従五位下)	25,000→30,000 koku	transfer from Tako Domain
2	Hoshina Masayuki (保科正之)	1631–1636	Ukon-no-ue-chūjō (左近衛中将)	Lower 4th (従四位下)	30,000 koku	transfer to Yamagata Domain
Torii clan (fudai) 1636–1689
1	Torii Tadaharu (鳥居忠春)	1636–1663	Shuzen-no-kami (主膳正)	Lower 5th (従五位下)	32,000 koku	transfer from Yamagata Domain
2	Torii Tadaharu (鳥居忠則)	1663–1689	Sakyō-no-suke (左京亮)	Lower 5th (従五位下)	32,000 koku	transfer to Shimomura Domain
	tenryō	1629–1668				
Naitō clan (fudai) 1691–1871
1	Naitō Kiyokazu (内藤清枚)	1691–1714	Tango-no-kami (丹後守)	Lower 5th (従五位下)	33,000 koku	transfer from Tondabayashi Domain
2	Naitō Kiyonori (内藤頼卿)	1714–1735	Iga-no-kami (伊賀守)	Lower 5th (従五位下)	33,000 koku	
3	Naitō Yoriyuki (内藤頼由)	1735–1776	Yamato-no-kami (大和守)	Lower 5th (従五位下)	33,000 koku	
4	Naitō Yoritaka (内藤頼尚)	1776–1776	Iga-no-kami (伊賀守)	Lower 5th (従五位下)	33,000 koku	
5	Naitō Nagayoshi (内藤長好)	1776–1791	Yamato-no-kami (大和守)	Lower 5th (従五位下)	33,000 koku	
6	Naitō Yorimochi (内藤頼以)	1791–1820	Yamato-no-kami (大和守)	Lower 5th (従五位下)	33,000 koku	
7	Naitō Yoriyasu (内藤頼寧)	1820–1859	Yamato-no-kami (大和守)	Lower 5th (従五位下)	33,000 koku	
8	Naitō Yorinao (内藤頼直)	1859–1871	Yamato-no-kami (大和守)	Lower 5th (従五位下)	33,000 koku	

=== Naitō Kiyokazu ===
Naitō Kiyokazu (内藤清枚, September 25, 1645 – May 29, 1714) was a daimyō in the early Edo period Tokugawa shogunate of Japan. He was the 2nd Naitō daimyō of Tondabayashi Domain in Kawachi Province, 'and 1st Naitō daimyō of Takatō Domain in Shinano Province. Kiyokazu was born in Edo as the second son of hatamoto and Ōmetsuke Mizuno Morimasa. He married a daughter of Naitō Shigeyori, the daimyō of Tondabashayshi Domain and was named heir in 1681. He became daimyō on the death of his adopted father in 1690. The following year, he was transferred by the shogunate to Takatō Domain in Shinano Province. He entered his holdings the same year, proclaiming a new set of 17 laws governing the domain and another set of 11 rules and regulations for his household. Although his domain had a nominal kokudaka of 39,000 koku, some 6000 koku was actually tenryō lands with revenues owed to the shogunate and there was little room for the development of new rice lands. His appointment to the post of Osaka kaban in 1694 and 1707 and as sōshaban from 1695 to 1697 also required the outlay of capital, and from the start the domain was in a precarious financial situation. In 1696, he changed his name from Kiyonaga (清長) to Kiyokazu (清枚). He died in 1714 at the age of 70 and his grave is at the temple of Taizō-ji in Shinjuku, Tokyo. The post station of Naitō Shinjuku was built on the site of Naitō Kiyakazu's nakayashiki residence in Edo.

=== Naitō Yorinori ===
Naitō Yorinori (内藤頼卿, 1697– March 21, 1735) was the 2nd Naitō daimyō of Takatō and 7th hereditary chieftain of the Takatō-Naitō clan. Yorinori was born in Edo and was the eldest son of Nagai Naohiro of Iiyama Domain. As Kiyokazu was already over 50 years old when Yornori was born, he had previously selected two adopted sons from other houses; however, these adopted sons were set aside, and Yorinori became daimyō on the death of his father in 1714. However, he was of weak health, and was unable to carry out the fiscal reforms the domain badly needed. He served as a sōshaban from 1724-1728, and in numerous other minor offices within the shogunate. He was married to a daughter of Matsudaira Chikayoshi of Funai Domain, but had no male heir. He died in 1735 at the age of 39 and his grave is at the temple of Taizō-ji in Shinjuku, Tokyo.

=== Naitō Yoriyuki ===
Naitō Yoriyuki (内藤頼由, 1708 – June 30, 1780) was the 3rd Naitō daimyō of Takatō and 8th hereditary chieftain of the Takatō-Naitō clan. Yorinori was born as the sixth son of Naitō Kiyokazu, and was adopted as posthumous heir to Naitō Yorinori shortly after the latter's death in 1735. In 1739, he was appointed Osaka kaban and from 1746 to 1775 served as a sōshaban. Problems with domain finances continued throughout his tenure. He was married to a daughter of Matsudaira Yasutoyo of Hamada Domain, but his son died in childhood and the domain was inherited by his adopted son on his retirement in 1776. He died in 1780, and his grave is at the temple of Taizō-ji in Shinjuku, Tokyo.

=== Naitō Yoritaka ===
Naitō Yoritaka (内藤頼尚, April 11, 1752 – December 5, 1776) was the 4th Naitō daimyō of Takatō and 9th hereditary chieftain of the Takatō-Naitō clan. Yoritaka was born as the third son of Naitō Nobuoki of Murakami Domain, and was adopted as heir to Naitō Yoriyuki in 1772, became daimyō on Yoriyuki's retirement in 1776. However, he died without male heir only eight months later at the age of 25. He was married to a daughter of Ota Suketoshi of Kakegawa Domain by whom he had three daughters. His grave is at the temple of Taizō-ji in Shinjuku, Tokyo.

=== Naitō Nagayoshi ===
Naitō Nagayoshi (内藤長好, May 5, 1771 – November 30, 1791) was the 5th Naitō daimyō of Takatō and 10th hereditary chieftain of the Takatō-Naitō clan. Nagayoshi was born in Edo as the son of Naitō Yorita, a son of Tokugawa Munekatsu of Owari Domain who was the adopted son of Naitō Yoriyuki. In 1771, he was adopted as heir to Naitō Yoritaka and became daimyō on the latter's death in 1776. However, he proved to be a poor choice, as he cared nothing for the administration of the domain, but spent his time hunting, organizing firework displays and on parties. He died without male heir in 1791 at the age of 23. He was married to a daughter of Kutsuki Totsuna of Fukuchiyama Domain. His grave is at the temple of Taizō-ji in Shinjuku, Tokyo.

=== Naitō Yorimochi ===
Naitō Yorimochi (内藤頼以, June 8, 1776 – March 18, 1856) was the 6th Naitō daimyō of Takatō and 11th hereditary chieftain of the Takatō-Naitō clan. Yorimochi was born the posthumous fifth son of Itakura Katsunori of Fukushima Domain, and was posthumously adopted as heir to the childless Naitō Nagayoshi in 1791. In 1792, he was received in formal audience by Shōgun Tokugawa Ienari. he served as a sōshaban from 1808 to 1819. He retired in 1820 and died in 1856. He was married to a daughter of Inaba Masayoshi of Yodo Domain. His grave is at the temple of Taizō-ji in Shinjuku, Tokyo.

=== Naitō Yoriyasu ===
Naitō Yoriyasu (内藤頼寧, March 23, 1800 – November 23, 1862) was the 7th Naitō daimyō of Takatō and 12th hereditary chieftain of the Takatō-Naitō clan.

=== Naitō Yorinao ===
Naitō Yorinao (内藤頼直, November 20, 1840 – August 17, 1879) was the 8th (and final) Naitō daimyō of Takatō and 13th hereditary chieftain of the Takatō-Naitō clan.

== See also ==
List of Han
