= Mibu Domain =

Feudal domain in Edo period Japan

Mibu Domain 壬生藩
- under Tokugawa shogunate Japan
- 1601–1871
- Capital: Mibu Castle
  - Type: Daimyō
- Historical era: Edo period
  - Established: 1601
  - Disestablished: 1871
- Today part of: part of Tochigi Prefecture

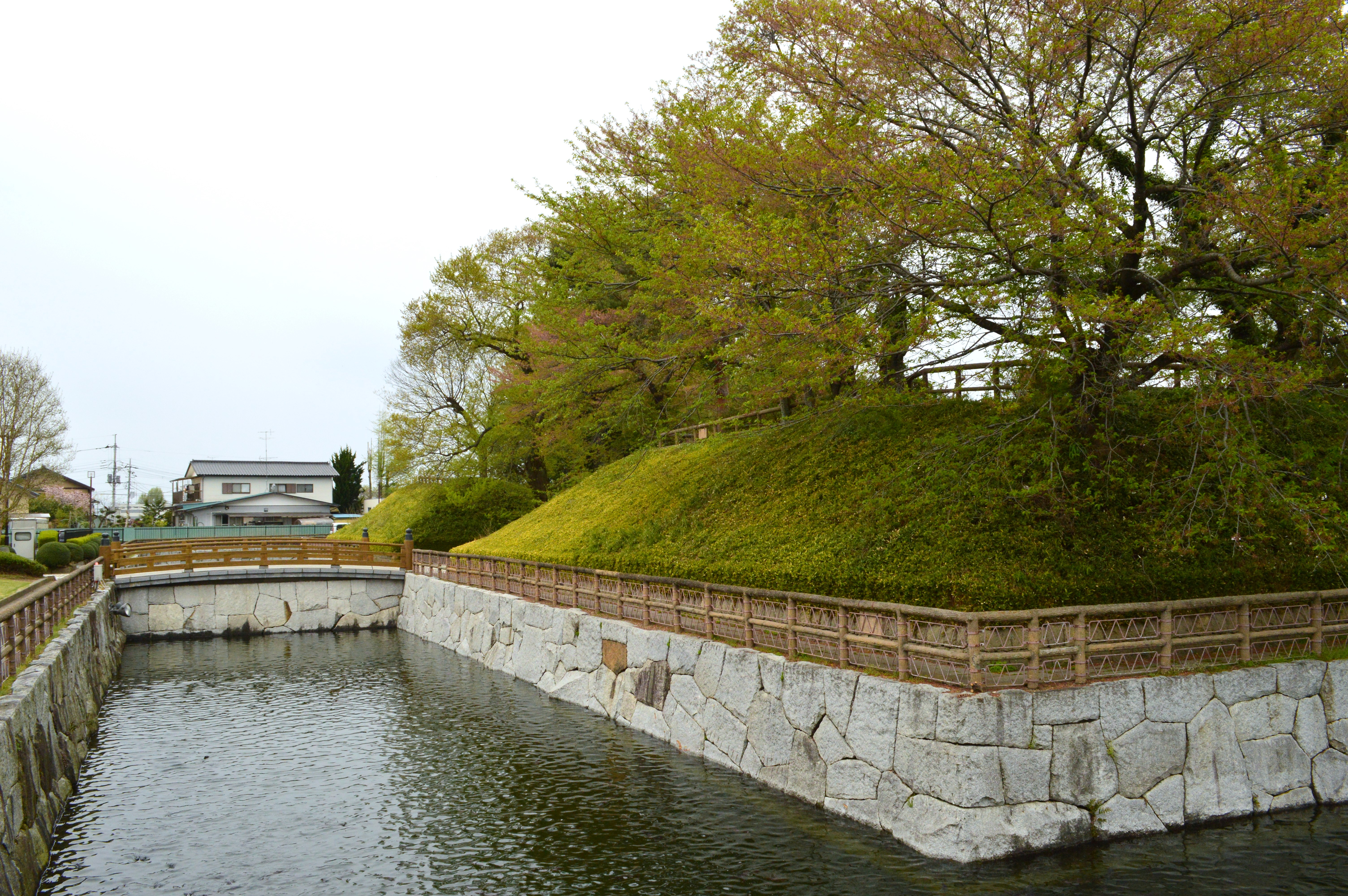
Site of Mibu Castle

Mibu Domain (壬生藩, Mibu han) was a feudal domain under the Tokugawa shogunate of Edo period Japan, located in Tsuga District of Shimotsuke Province (modern-day Tochigi Prefecture), Japan. It was centered on Mibu Castle in what is now part of the town of Mibu, Tochigi. Mibu was ruled through much of its history by a branch of the fudai Torii clan.

== History ==
The Mibu clan, which had ruled this area since the Muromachi period was destroyed at the Battle of Odawara in 1590, and their lands came under the control of the Yūki clan. After the Battle of Sekigahara, Tokugawa Ieyasu assigned a 19,000 koku holding in this area to Hineno Yoshiaki, formerly of Takashima Domain in Shinano Province in 1602. Hineno was instrumental in the construction of the Nikkō Tōshō-gū complex, and was rewarded for his efforts in 1634 by a transfer to Funai Domain (20,000 koku).

Mibu was assigned to Abe Tadaaki, who had served as a Rōjū to Shōgun Tokugawa Iemitsu, with revenues raised to 25,000 koku. He was reassigned in 1639 to Oishi Domain in Musashi Province.

Mibu then came under the control of the Miura clan, for three generations, until the transfer of wakadoshiyori Miura Akihiro to Nobeoka Domain in 1692.

Shōgun Tokugawa Tsunayoshi then assigned the domain to Matsudaira Terusada, with an increase in size to 32,000 koku, and then 42,000 koku; however, he remained for only 3 years until his reassignment to Takasaki Domain. The domain was then reduced back to 25,000 koku and given to Katō Akihide, also a former wakadoshiyori, who made many attempts to reform the domain's finances and administration. After his son, Katō Yoshinori was transferred to Minakuchi Domain in 1712, Mibu came under the control of the Torii clan, who then ruled until the Meiji Restoration.

The 6th daimyō, Torii Tadatomi, sided with the Satchō Alliance in the Boshin War of the Meiji Restoration, and fought in the Battle of Aizu, despite considerable opposition within the ranks of his samurai. The final daimyō, Torii Tadafumi was later raised to the rank of viscount in the kazoku peerage system, and served as the Japanese consul to the Kingdom of Hawaii.

After the abolition of the han system in July 1871, Mibu Domain became part of Tochigi Prefecture. The domain had a samurai-class population of 1693 people in 437 households, per a census in 1870.

== Holdings at the end of the Edo period ==
As with most domains in the han system, Mibu Domain consisted of several discontinuous territories calculated to provide the assigned kokudaka, based on periodic cadastral surveys and projected agricultural yields.

- Shimotsuke Province
  - 38 villages in Tsuga District
- Shimōsa Province
  - 1 village in Katsushika District
  - 4 villages in Sashima District
  - 15 villages in Yuki District
- Yamato Province
  - 4 villages in Katsuge District
- Harima Province
  - 25 villages in Mino District
  - 4 villages in Kato District

== List of daimyōs ==
#	Name	Tenure	Courtesy title	Court Rank	kokudaka
Hineno clan (tozama) 1601–1634
1	Hineno Yoshiaikira (日根野吉明)	1601–1634	Oribe-no-sho (織部正)	Lower 5th (従五位下)	19,000 koku
Abe clan (fudai) 1634–1639
1	Abe Tadaaki (阿部忠秋)	1634–1639	Bungo-no-kami (豊後守)	Lower 5th (従五位下)	25,000 koku
Miura clan (fudai) 1639–1681
1	Miura Masatsugu (三浦正次)	1639–1641	Shima-no-kami (志摩守)	Lower 5th (従五位下)	25,000 koku
2	Miura Yasutsugu (三浦安次)	1641–1682	Shima-no-kami(志摩守)	Lower 5th (従五 位下)	25,000 koku
3	Miura Akihiro (三浦明敬)	1682–1692	Iki-no-kami(壱岐守)	Lower 5th (従五 位下)	25,000 koku
Matsudaira clan (fudai) 1692–1695
1	Matsudaira Terusada (松平輝貞)	1692–1695	Sakyo-no-taifu (右京大夫)	Lower 4th (従四 位下)	32,000 -> 42,000 koku
Katō clan (fudai) 1695–1712
1	Katō Akihide (加藤明英)	1695–1712	Etchu-no-kami (伊予守)	Lower 5th (従五 位下)	25,000 koku
2	Katō Yoshinori (加藤嘉矩)	1712–1712	Izumi-no-kami (和泉守)	Lower 5th (従五 位下)	25,000 koku
Torii clan (fudai) 1712–1868
1	Torii Tadateru (鳥居忠英)	1712–1716	Iga-no-kami (伊賀守)	Lower 5th (従五 位下)	30,000 koku
2	Torii Tadaakira (鳥居忠瞭)	1716–1735	Tamba-no-kami (丹波守)	Lower 5th (従五 位下)	30,000 koku
3	Torii Tadaoki (居忠意)	1735–1794	Iga-no-kami (伊賀守); Jiju (侍従)	Lower 4th (従四位下)	30,000 koku
4	Torii Tadateru (2nd) (鳥居忠熹)	1794–1821	Tamba-no-kami (丹波守)	Lower 5th (従五 位下)	30,000 koku
5	Torii Tadaakira (2nd) (鳥居忠威)	1821–1826	Tamba-no-kami (丹波守)	Lower 5th (従五 位下)	30,000 koku
6	Torii Tadahiro (鳥居忠挙)	1826–1867	Tamba-no-kami (丹波守)	Lower 5th (従五 位下)	30,000 koku
7	Torii Tadatomi (鳥居忠宝)	1857–1870	Tamba-no-kami (丹波守)	Lower 5th (従五 位下)	30,000 koku
8	Torii Tadafumi (鳥居忠文)	1870–1871	-none-	Lower 5th (従五 位下)	30,000 koku
