= Chikayoshi =

- Gender: Male

Origin
- Origin: Japanese
- Meaning: Different meanings depending on the kanji used

Chikayoshi (written: 近説 or 親吉) is a masculine Japanese given name. Notable people with the name include:

- Hiraiwa Chikayoshi (平岩 親吉; 1542–1611), Japanese daimyō
- Matsudaira Chikayoshi (松平 近説; 1829–1886), Japanese samurai and daimyō
