= Tadatsune =

- Gender: Male

Origin
- Origin: Japanese
- Meaning: Different meanings depending on the kanji used

Tadatsune (written: 忠恒 or 忠常) is a masculine Japanese given name. Notable people with the name include:

- Shimazu Tadatsune (島津 忠恒) (1576–1638), Japanese daimyō
- Taira no Tadatsune (平 忠常) (died 1031), Japanese samurai
- Torii Tadatsune (鳥居 忠恒) (1604–1636), Japanese daimyō
