= Tako Domain =

Tako Domain 多胡藩
- under Tokugawa shogunate Japan
- 1590–1871
- Capital: Tako jin'ya
  - Type: Daimyō
- Historical era: Edo period
  - Established: 1590
  - Disestablished: 1871
- Today part of: part of Chiba Prefecture

Tako Domain (多胡藩, Tako-han) was a minor feudal domain under the Tokugawa shogunate of Edo-period Japan, located in Shimōsa Province (the northern portion of Chiba Prefecture Japan. It was centered on what is now part of the town of Tako in Katori District. It was ruled for most of its history by the Matsudaira (Hisamatsu) clan.

== History ==
Tako Domain was originally created for Hoshina Masamitsu in 1590, a retainer of Tokugawa Ieyasu. After the Battle of Sekigahara, he was transferred to Takatō Domain, and Tako Domain passed into the tenryō territories directly controlled by the Tokugawa shogunate, and administered by hatamoto, which included members of the Matsudaira (Hisamatsu) clan.

In 1713, Matsudaira Katsuyuki, who administered 8000 koku within Katori District, gained an additional 3000 koku of revenue in Settsu Province. The combined amount of 12,000 koku was enough to qualify him as a daimyō and Tako Domain was revived. He was allowed to build a jin'ya in what later become the town of Omigawa, Chiba, where his successors continued to rule until the Meiji Restoration.

== Holdings at the end of the Edo period ==
As with most domains in the han system, Tako Domain consisted of several discontinuous territories calculated to provide the assigned kokudaka, based on periodic cadastral surveys and projected agricultural yields.

- Shimōsa Province
  - 5 villages in Katori District
- Mutsu Province (Iwaki)
  - 6 villages in Ishikawa District
  - 7 villages in Naraha District
- Shimotsuke Province
  - 6 villages in Tsuga District
  - 1 village in Kawachi District

== List of daimyō ==
#	Name	Tenure	Courtesy title	Court Rank	kokudaka
Hoshina clan (fudai) 1590–1601
1	Hoshina Masamitsu (保科正光)	1590–1600	Higo-no-kami (肥後守)	Lower 5th (従五位下)	10,000 koku
x	tenryō	1600–1713			
Matsudaira (Hisamatsu) clan (fudai) 1713–1871
1	Matsudaira Katsuyuki (松平勝以)	1713–1728	Buzen-no-kami (豊前守)	Lower 5th (従五位下)	12,000 koku
2	Matsudaira Katsufusa (松平勝房)	1728–1736	Mino-no-kami (美濃守)	Lower 5th (従五位下)	12,000 koku
3	Matsudaira Katsutada (松平勝尹)	1736–1768	Okura-no-sho (大蔵少輔)	Lower 5th (従五位下)	12,000 koku
4	Matsudaira Katsutake (松平勝全)	1768–1794	Buzen-no-kami (豊前守)	Lower 5th (従五位下)	12,000 koku
5	Matsudaira Katsuyuki (松平勝升)	1794–1818	Nakatsukasa-no-sho (中務少輔)	Lower 5th (従五位下)	12,000 koku
6	Matsudaira Katsunori (松平勝権)	1818–1848	Sagami-no-kami (相模守)	Lower 5th (従五位下)	12,000 koku
7	Matsudaira Katsuyuki (久松勝行)	1848–1869	Bungo-no-kami (豊後守)	Lower 5th (従五位下)	12,000 –> 10,000 koku
8	Matsudaira Katsunari (久松勝慈)	1869–1871	Buzen-no-kami (豊前守)	Lower 5th (従五位下)	10,000 koku
