= Torii Tadateru =

Japanese daimyō

Lord of Mibu
- In office 1712–1716
- Preceded by: Katō Yoshinori
- Succeeded by: Torii Tadaakira

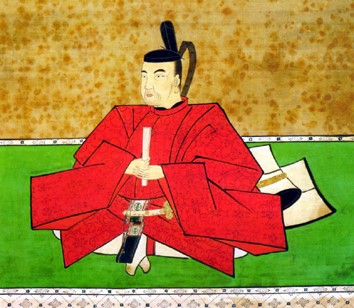
Torii Tadateru Portrait

Torii Tadateru (鳥居 忠英; 1665 – May 12, 1716) was a Japanese daimyō of the early Edo period who ruled the Shimomura, Minakuchi, and Mibu Domains. In 1841, after Takashima Shūhan first modern Western military demonstration in Tokumarugahara, Torii Tadateru was one of the high rank nobles who criticised him, this ending with Takashima placed under investigation and house arrest on charges of subversion and conspiracy

Preceded by Torii Tadanori	Torii clan head 1689–1716	Succeeded by Torii Tadaakira
Preceded by none	Daimyō of Shimamura; 1689–1695	Succeeded by none
Preceded by Katō Akihide	Daimyō of Minakuchi; 1695–1712	Succeeded by Katō Yoshinori
Preceded by Katō Yoshinori	Daimyō of Mibu; 1712–1716	Succeeded by Torii Tadaakira
