= Siege of Odawara (1569) =

1569 battle in Japan

Second siege of Odawara
- Part of the Sengoku period
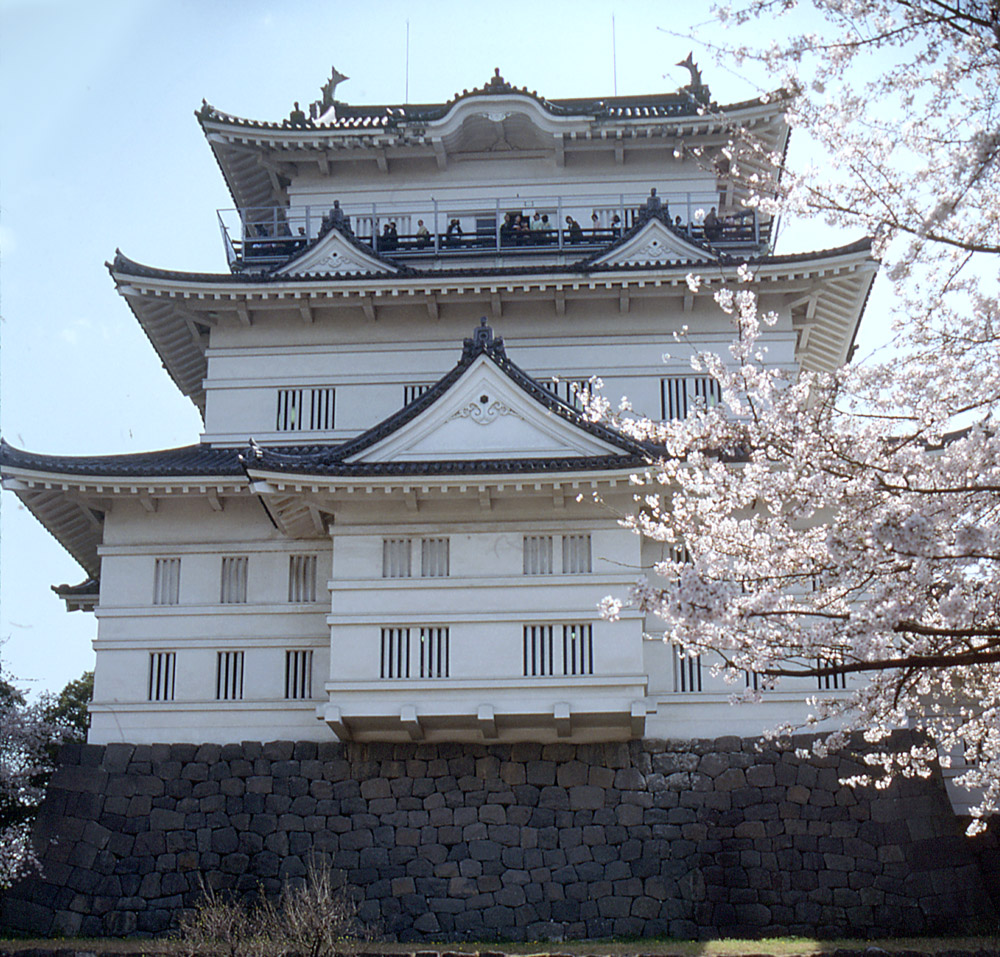
- One of Odawara's towers
Date	1569
Location	Odawara castle, Sagami province, Japan 35°15′04″N 139°09′13″E
Result	Hôjô victory; Takeda withdraws; town burned

Belligerents
Forces of Takeda Shingen	Forces of Hojo Ujiyasu

Commanders and leaders
Takeda Shingen; Kōsaka Masanobu; Hoshina Masatoshi; Sanada Yukitaka; Sanada Masayuki	Hōjō Ujiyasu; Hōjō Ujimasa

Strength
20,000	20,000
- Location within Kanagawa Prefecture Siege of Odawara (1569) (Japan)

The second siege of Odawara took place in 1569. Takeda Shingen attacked Odawara Castle, as a response to the Hōjō clan's intervention in the Takeda clan's invasion of Suruga Province.

== Background ==
In 1568, as a response to the Hōjō intervention in the Takeda invasion of Suruga Province, Shingen broke his alliance with the Hōjō, and came into Hōjō territory.

== Siege ==
Shingen came into Musashi Province from his home province of Kai, attacking the Takiyama and Hachigata Castles, where Ujiyasu's sons repulsed them. After failing at the siege of Takiyama and the siege of Hachigata (1568), Shingen nevertheless moved to Sagami Province against the Hōjō's capital fortress of Odawara in 1569. The siege lasted only three days, after which the Takeda forces burned the town to the ground and left.

== Aftermath ==
Odawara castle itself did not fall and was still held by the Hōjō and end of Shingen's campaign in Sagami Province.
