= Hoshina Masatsune =

- 保科 正経
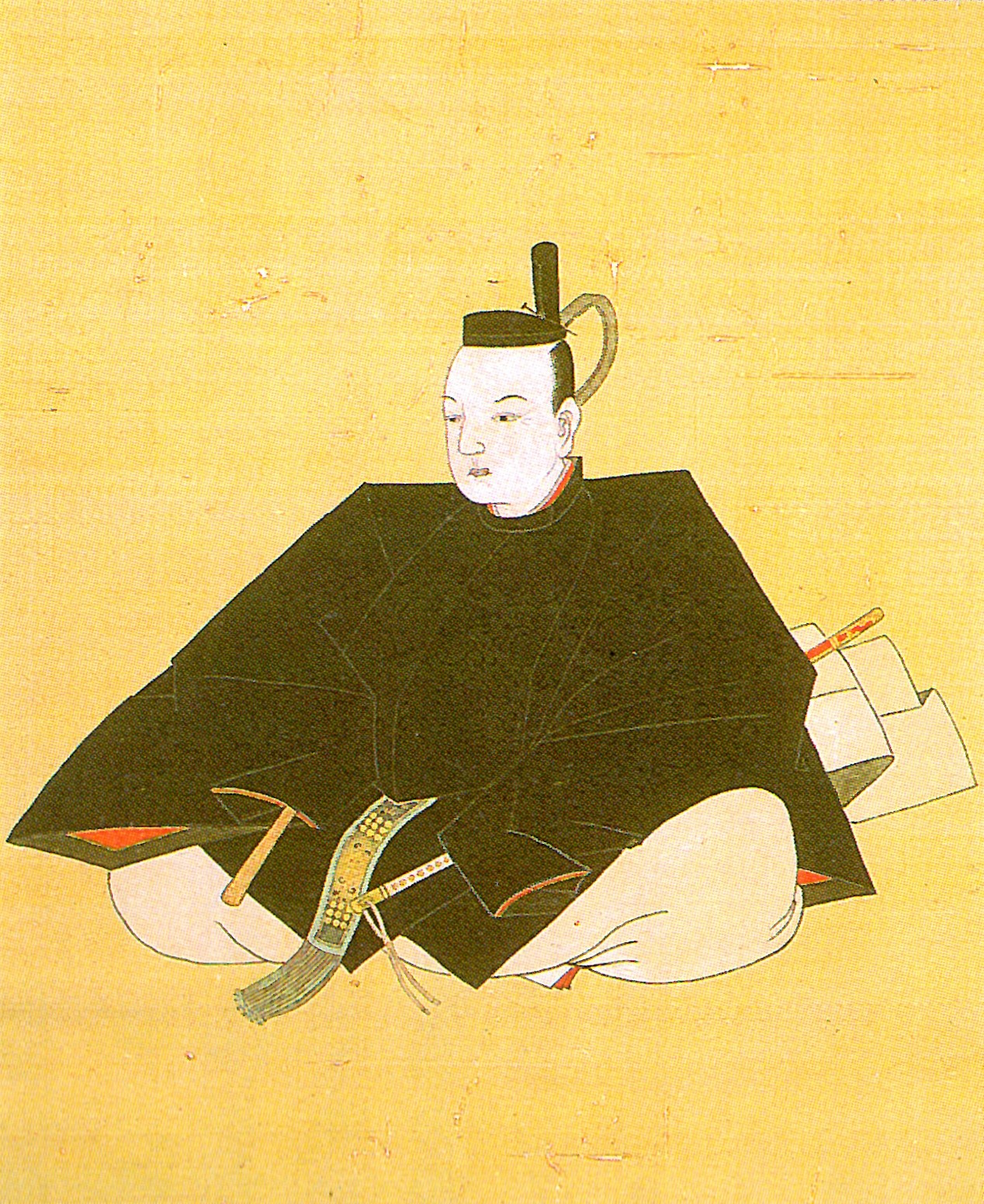
- Hoshina Masatsune portrait at Kempuku-ji, Ina, Nagano

2nd Daimyō of Aizu Domain
- In office 1681–1731
- Monarchs: Shōgun: Tokugawa Ietsuna; Tokugawa Tsunayoshi
- Preceded by: Hoshina Masayuki
- Succeeded by: Matsudaira Masakata

Personal details
- Born: February 1, 1647
- Died: November 12, 1681 (aged 34)
- Spouse(s): Kuma, daughter of Maeda Toshitsune of Kaga Domain
- Parent: Hoshina Masayuki (father)

Hoshina Masatsune (保科 正経, February 1, 1647 – November 12, 1681) was the 2nd daimyō of Aizu Domain in Mutsu Province, Japan (modern-day Fukushima Prefecture). His courtesy title was Chikuzen-no-kami and Jijū, and his Court rank was Senior Fourth Rank, Lower Grade.

== Biography ==
Masatsune was the fourth son of Hoshina Masayuki and became daimyō in 1669 on the retirement of his father. He understood the construction of his father's monumental grave at Hanitsu Jinja in Inawashiro in 1675. He is also known for reviving the Oyaku-en, a medicinal herbs garden which had been established by the Ashina clan during their tenure over Aizu. However, his tenure was a constant struggle against the machinations of his mother, Shoko-in (1620-1691), who wielded a strong influence and promoted less-than-qualified relatives to various high posts, including that of karō. He was married to a daughter of Maeda Toshitsune of Kaga Domain, but had only one daughter. He adopted his younger brother, Matsudaira Masakata as his heir and died in 1681.

== See also ==
- Hoshina clan
