= Naitō Yoriyasu =

Naitō Yoriyasu 内藤頼寧
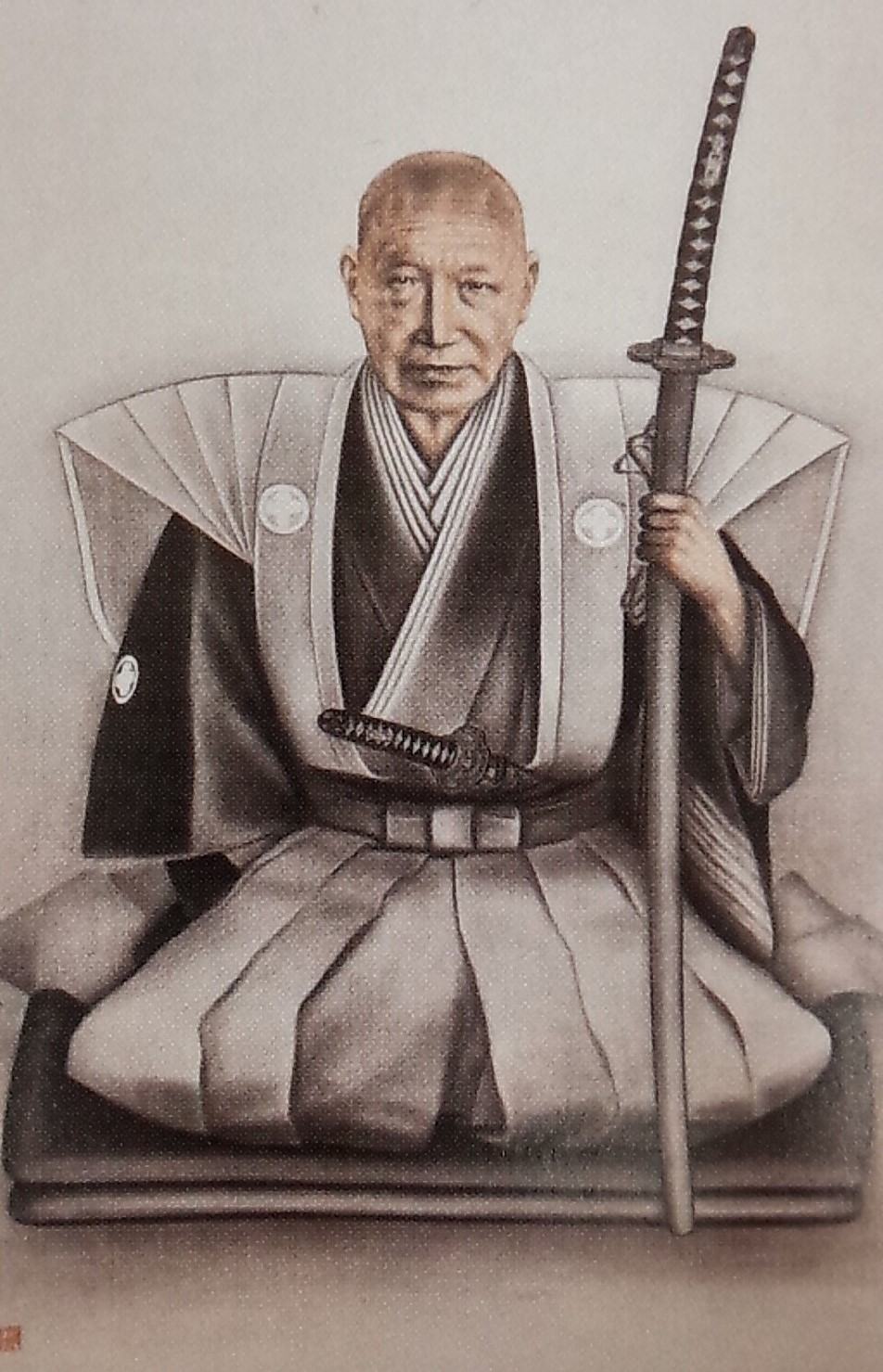
- Born: March 23, 1800
- Died: November 23, 1862 (aged 62)
- Occupation: Daimyō of Takatō Domain (1820–1859)
- Father: Naitō Yorimochi

Naitō Yoriyasu (内藤頼寧; March 23, 1800 – November 23, 1862) was the 7th Naitō daimyō of Takatō Domain in Shinano Province, Honshū, Japan (modern-day Nagano Prefecture) and 12th hereditary chieftain of the Takatō-Naitō clan. His courtesy title was Ōsumi-no-kami, later Yamato-no-kami and subsequently Suruga-no-kami, and his Court rank was Junior Fifth Rank, Lower Grade.

== Biography ==
Naitō Yoriyasu was the third son of Naitō Yorimochi, and was proclaimed heir after his elder brother Yorikata was disinherited for reasons which are unknown to history. He became daimyō in 1820 on the retirement of his father. In 1826 he became a sōshaban and was promoted to the post of wakadoshiyori in 1841. he was noted as a scholar, and for his familiarity with Noh drama and the Japanese tea ceremony. He attempted to reform the domain's finances by encouraging the development of commerce, opening new rice fields and establishing a domain monopoly on mulberry production and sericulture. He maintained an active correspondence with other reform-minded daimyō, including Shimazu Nariakira, Matsudaira Shungaku and the Toda clan. However, most of his efforts were thwarted by peasant revolts. He also submitted missives to the shogunate warning of Japan's weak military position vis-a-vis the United States, supported the efforts of Egawa Hidetatsu to modernize the Japanese military and retrained his own forces along western lines. An avid fisherman, he designed the ponds at his Fukagawa residence in Edo to be filled with seawater, which he stocked with fish. It is also recorded that when he invited his fellow daimyō over for a fishing party, he made sure that the stocked fish were well-fed beforehand, so that his guests would not catch any.

He retired from public life in 1859 and died in 1862.His grave is at the temple of Taizō-ji in Shinjuku, Tokyo.

His first wife was a daughter of Sakai Tadamichi of Himeji Domain. After her death, he remarried to an adopted daughter of Sakai Tadamitsu of Himeji.

Preceded by Naitō Yorimochi	7th Daimyo of Takatō; 1820-1859	Succeeded by Naitō Yorinao
