= Hoshina Masayuki =

Japanese magistrate (1611–1673)

- 保科 正之
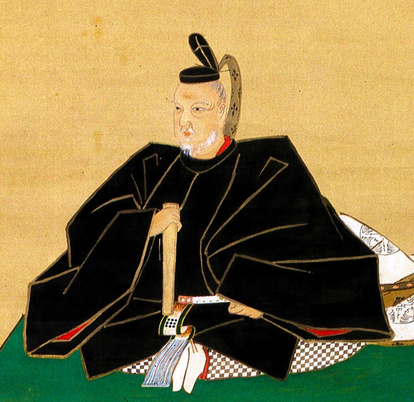
- Hoshina Masayuki by Kanō Tan'yū, portrait at Hanitsu Jinja, Inawashiro, Fukushima

2nd Daimyō of Takatō Domain
- In office 1631–1636
- Monarchs: Shōgun: Tokugawa Hidetada; Tokugawa Iemitsu
- Preceded by: Hoshina Masamitsu
- Succeeded by: Torii Tadaharu

1st Daimyō of Yamagata Domain
- In office 1636–1643
- Monarch: Shōgun: Tokugawa Iemitsu
- Preceded by: Torii Tadatsune
- Succeeded by: Matsudaira Naomoto

1st Daimyō of Aizu Domain
- In office 1643–1669
- Monarchs: Shōgun: Tokugawa Iemitsu; Tokugawa Ietsuna
- Preceded by: None
- Succeeded by: Hoshina Masatsune

Personal details
- Born: June 17, 1611 Edo, Japan
- Died: February 4, 1673 (aged 61)
- Spouse(s): Kikuhime, daughter of Naito Masanaga of Sanuki Domain
- Relations: Father: Tokugawa Hidetada; Mother: Oshizu no Kata

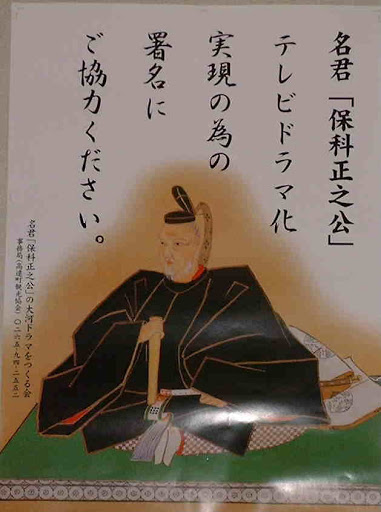
It says "Please support by signing for the TV drama adaptation of a wise ruler, Hoshina Masayuki"

Hoshina Masayuki (保科 正之; June 17, 1611 – February 4, 1673) was a Japanese daimyō of the early Edo period, who was the founder of what became the Matsudaira house of Aizu. He was an important figure in the politics and philosophy of the early Tokugawa shogunate.

== Biography ==
Hoshina Masayuki was born in Edo, the illegitimate 4th son of the 2nd shōgun, Tokugawa Hidetada. As Masayuki's mother, Oshizu no Kata (1584–1635, later called Jōkō-in) was a servant, Hidetada chose to hide the newborn, then named Komatsu (幸松). This was to protect him from potential infanticide at the hands of Oeyo, Hidetada's wife. Komatsu was later secretly given in adoption to Hoshina Masamitsu, a former Takeda retainer and daimyō of Takatō Domain. In 1629, Komatsu first met his elder brother, the third Shōgun Tokugawa Iemitsu, father, the retired-Shōgun (Tokugawa Hidetada) and another older brother, Tokugawa Tadanaga, and was given some mementos of his grandfather, Tokugawa Ieyasu as recognition of his status as a member of the Tokugawa lineage.

In 1631, Komatsu inherited the Hoshina clan chieftainship, as well as the Takatō fief, and changed his name to "Masayuki". He was also granted the courtesy titles of Higo-no-kami and Sakonoegonchūjō and court rank of Upper 4th, Junior grade. Following the death of Tokugawa Hidetada, Masayuki became one of the closest confidants and assistants to Tokugawa Iemitsu, and wielded political power considerably greater than his official status of a 30,000 koku daimyō would indicate. He was ordered to construct his Edo residence immediately outside the Sakurada Gate to Edo Castle, was entrusted with the construction of Hidetada's mausoleum at Zōjō-ji and with the 17th memorial services for Tokugawa Ieyasu at Nikkō Tōshō-gū. He was instrumental in writing the Buke shohatto regulations issued in 1635, which codified the laws and regulations governing the conduct of the daimyō and samurai under the shogunate.

In 1636, Masayuki was transferred to Yamagata Domain, with a kokudaka of 200,000 koku. During the Shimabara rebellion of 1637, he was made general of reinforcements which the shogunate had prepared to send to Kyushu, but the rebellion was crushed before the army could be dispatched.

In 1643, he was again transferred, this time to Aizu Domain in Mutsu Province, where his kokudaka was officially set at 230,000 koku; however, as Aizu Domain was also entrusted with the administration of all tenryō territories in the Aizu area, his true income was more than double this amount. Masayuki was entrusted by Tokugawa Iemitsu with the regency during the minority of his nephew, the 4th Shōgun Tokugawa Ietsuna, which made him virtual ruler of Japan for several years until Ietsuna reached his majority. However, he refused an offer to be allowed to use the Tokugawa family crest and to change his surname to Matsudaira, partly out of respect for the Hoshina clan which raised him, and partly to emphasize that he had no designs to usurp the authority of the main line of the Tokugawa lineage. (The crest and surname were later adopted during the tenure of his son Masakata).

Masayuki was also a patron of Yamazaki Ansai, one of the early figures in Edo-era Japanese Neo-Confucianism, and together with him wrote the famous Aizu House Code, which included a direct injunction regarding the loyalty of the clan to the Shōgun.

In 1669, he officially retired from his duties, turning over Aizu Domain to his son, Hoshina Masatsune. He died at the clan's residence in Mita in Edo in 1673. Masayuki was a disciple of Yoshikawa Shintō and at his request he was buried according to Shinto rituals on the grounds of Hanitsu Shrine near Lake Inawashiro. He was deified after his death as the kami Hanitsu-reishin (土津霊神).

Masayuki's descendants remained enfeoffed at Aizu Domain for the remainder of the Edo period, until they were defeated by the forces of the new Meiji government during the Boshin War.

== Family ==
- Father: Tokugawa Hidetada
- Mother: Oshizu no Kata (1584–1635) later Jōkō-in
- Adopted Father: Hoshina Masamitsu
- Adopted Mother: Genshoin (d.1622)
- Wife, Concubines, Children:
  - Wife: Kikuhime (1619-1637) daughter of Naitō Masanaga
    - Hoshina Yukimatsu (1634-1638)
  - Wife: Oman (1620-1691) daughter of Fujiki Hiroyuki later Shōkōin
    - Hoshina Masayori (1640-1657)
    - Haruhime
    - Nakahime (1643-1649)
    - Shogen (b.1645)
    - Hoshina Masatsune (1646-1681)
    - Ishihime (1648-1667) married Inaba Masamichi
    - Kazehime (1649-1651)
    - Kamehime (1650-1651)
    - Hoshina Masazumi (1652-1671)
  - Concubine: Ushida no Kata
    - Kikuhime (1645-1647)
    - Matsuhime (1648-1666) married Maeda Tsunanori
  - Concubine: Sawai no Kata
    - Kinhime (1658-1659)
  - Concubine: Oki no Kata
    - Matsudaira Masakata (1669-1731)
    - Sanhime (b.1673)

== Historical assessment ==
Hoshina Masayuki is regarded as one of the most distinguished rulers in Japanese history. However, his statements, such as "Loyalty to the Tokugawa shogunate is absolute" and "Those who defy this are not my descendants and must not be followed," later became a source of hardship for the Aizu domain. Matsudaira Katamori (1836–1893), adhering to Masayuki's words, devoted himself to serving the Shogunate. However, this steadfast loyalty drew the ire of Satsuma and Chōshū, ultimately leading to Aizu becoming one of the most tragic battlefields of the Boshin War.

== Anecdotes ==
Tokugawa Iemitsu asked the famed swordsman Miyamoto Musashi to paint a screen portraying wild ducks. This passed into the hands of Masayuki, who took it with him to Aizu and kept it as one of his family treasures.

Preceded by Hoshina Masamitsu	Hoshina family head 1631–1669	Succeeded by Hoshina Masatsune
Preceded by Hoshina Masamitsu	Daimyō of Takatō; 1631–1636	Succeeded by Torii Tadaharu
Preceded by Torii Tadatsune	Daimyō of Yamagata; 1636–1643	Succeeded by Matsudaira Naomoto
Preceded by Katō Akinari	Daimyō of Aizu; 1643–1669	Succeeded by Hoshina Masatsune
