= Torii Tadafumi =

Japanese daimyō

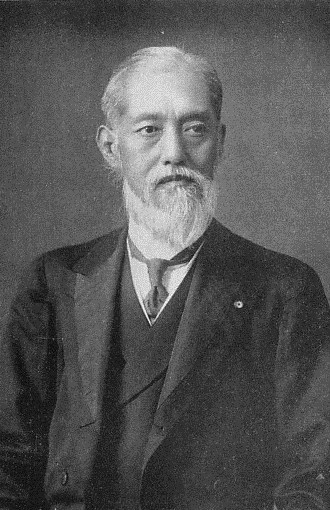

Viscount Torii Tadafumi (鳥居 忠文; October 19, 1847 – October 1914) was a Japanese samurai of the late Edo period who served as daimyō of the Mibu Domain in Shimotsuke Province. Succeeded to the family headship in 1870 following his elder brother Torii Tadatomi's retirement due to illness.

He served as Vice Consul to the Kingdom of Hawaii under Taro Ando and was Acting Consul in 1889.

Tadafumi later became a viscount (子爵 shishaku) and a member of the Council of Peers.

Preceded by Torii Tadatomi	8th Lord of Mibu (Torii); 1870-1871	Succeeded by none
