= Hoshina Masanao =

Japanese daimyō

Hoshina Masanao (保科 正直) (1542 – October 21, 1601) was a Japanese daimyō of the Sengoku period, who served the Takeda clan. He was the successor of his father Hoshina Masatoshi in the ranks of the senior Takeda retainers, and was given command of 250 cavalry.

Masanao was driven out of Takatō Castle following a Siege of Takatō (1582), but was soon allowed to return through the assistance of the Hojo clan. Following a brief conflict with Tokugawa Ieyasu's forces, Masanao became a Tokugawa retainer, and was allowed to retain Takatō. He took part in the Siege of Odawara (1590) under Ieyasu's command, and moved to the Kantō region together with Ieyasu. In the Kantō, Masanao was granted the Tako Domain.

== Family ==
- Father: Hoshina Masatoshi
- Wife: Takehime (1553–1618), half sister of Tokugawa Ieyasu
- Concubines:
  - Atobeshi-dono
- Children:
  - Hoshina Masamitsu by Atobeshi-dono
  - Hoshina Masashige
  - Hoshina Masasada by Takehime
  - Hojo Ujishige by Takehime
  - Eihime (1585–1635) married Kuroda Nagamasa by Takehime
  - Teishoin (1591–1664) married Koide Yoshihide by Takehime
  - daughter married Anbe Nobumori by Takehime
  - daughter married Kato Akinari by Takehime
  - daughter married Kohinata Genzaemon

== Notes ==
Preceded by Hoshina Masatoshi	Hoshina family head ????–????	Succeeded by Hoshina Masamitsu
