= Hoshina Masamitsu =

Japanese daimyō

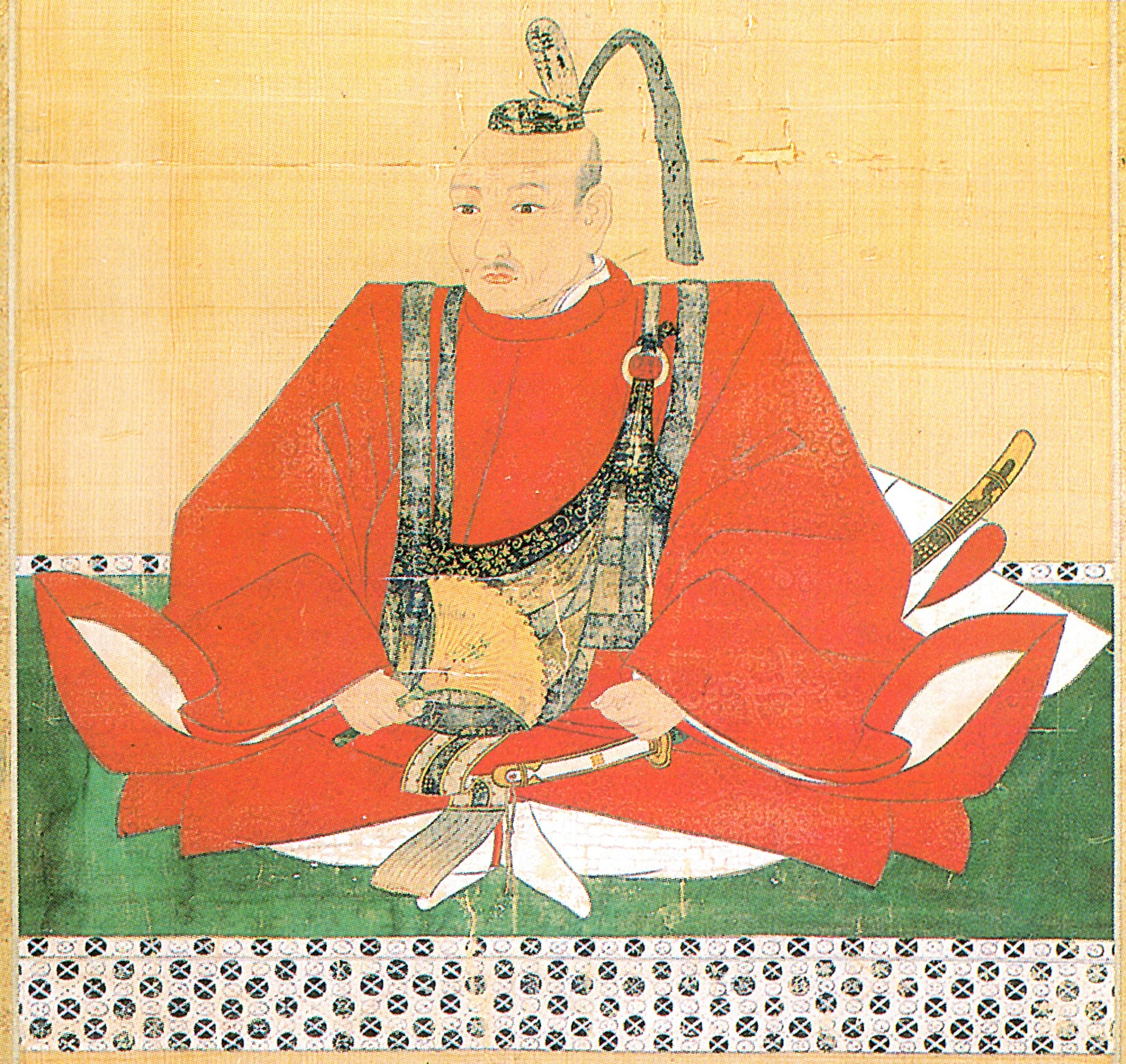
Hoshina Masamitsu

Hoshina Masamitsu (保科 正光, 1561 – October 31, 1631) was a Japanese daimyō of the Edo period, who served the Tokugawa clan. Masamitsu was the son of Hoshina Masanao, and after having lent his support to Tokugawa Ieyasu at the 1600 Battle of Sekigahara, he was given the Takatō fief in 1600.

With his father's death the following year in Takatō, Masamitsu became the new head of the Hoshina clan and served throughout the Osaka Campaigns of 1614 and 1615. Masamitsu was later privileged with the adoption of Tokugawa Hidetada's fourth son Komatsu, the future Hoshina Masayuki. His childhood name was Jinshiro (甚四郎).

== Family ==
- Father: Hoshina Masanao
- Mother: Atobeshi-dono
- Wife: daughter of Sanada Masayuki
- Adopted Sons:
  - Hoshina Masasada
  - Hoshina Masashige
  - Hoshina Masayuki
  - Sanada Sagenta

Preceded by none	1st Lord of Tako (Hoshina); 1590–1600	Succeeded by Matsudaira Katsutoshi
Preceded by none	1st Lord of Takatō (Hoshina); 1600–1631	Succeeded by Hoshina Masayuki
