= Matsudaira Chikayoshi =

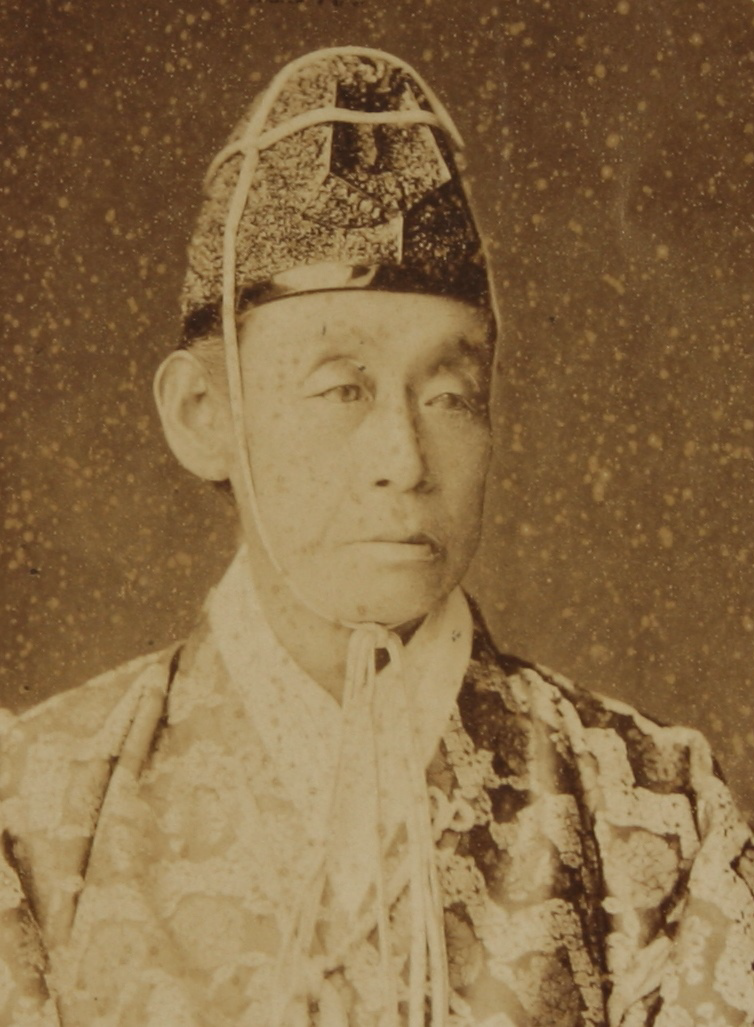

Lord of Funai
- In office January 31, 1837 – August 6, 1857
- Preceded by: Matsudaira Chikanobu
- Succeeded by: none

Personal details
- Born: January 10, 1829
- Died: November 11, 1886 (aged 57)

Matsudaira Chikayoshi (松平 近説); (January 10, 1829 – November 11, 1886) was a Japanese samurai of the late Edo period who served as daimyō of the Funai Domain (Bungo Province, 21,000 koku). Served in a variety of positions in the Tokugawa Shogunate, including that of wakadoshiyori. Resigning from the family headship in 1871, he went into retirement.

Preceded by Matsudaira Chikanobu	Daimyo of Funai; 1841-1871	Succeeded by none
