= Torii Tadaharu =

Japanese daimyō

Lord of Takatō
- In office 1636–1663
- Preceded by: Hoshina Masayuki
- Succeeded by: Torii Tadanori

Personal details
- Born: 1624
- Died: September 2, 1663 (aged 38–39) Osaka, Japan

Torii Tadaharu (鳥居 忠春; 1624 – September 2, 1663) was a Japanese daimyō of the early Edo period who ruled the Takatō Domain in Shinano Province (modern-day Nagano Prefecture).

== History ==
Tadaharu was the 3rd son of Torii Tadamasa, the lord of the Yamagata Domain. As his father died before a successor was named from among his sons, the Torii family's holdings were confiscated. However, because of his grandfather Torii Mototada's distinguished service, the family name was restored, and Tadaharu was made lord of the Takatō fief, with an income of 32,000 koku.

Tadaharu was first famed for his wise rulership of Takatō; however, his rule soon became oppressive, especially after he killed seven of his senior retainers who admonished him. Many of the peasants from Takatō fled to Tokugawa-controlled tenryō territory in 1654. In 1663, while serving at Osaka Castle, Tadaharu was murdered by his doctor Matsui Jukaku.

The family headship was passed to Tadaharu's eldest son Tadanori.

Preceded by Hoshina Masayuki	Daimyō of Takatō; 1636–1663	Succeeded by Torii Tadanori
