= Funai Domain =

Administrative division in Japan during the Edo period (1600–1871)

Funai Domain 府内藩
- Domain of Japan
- 1600–1871
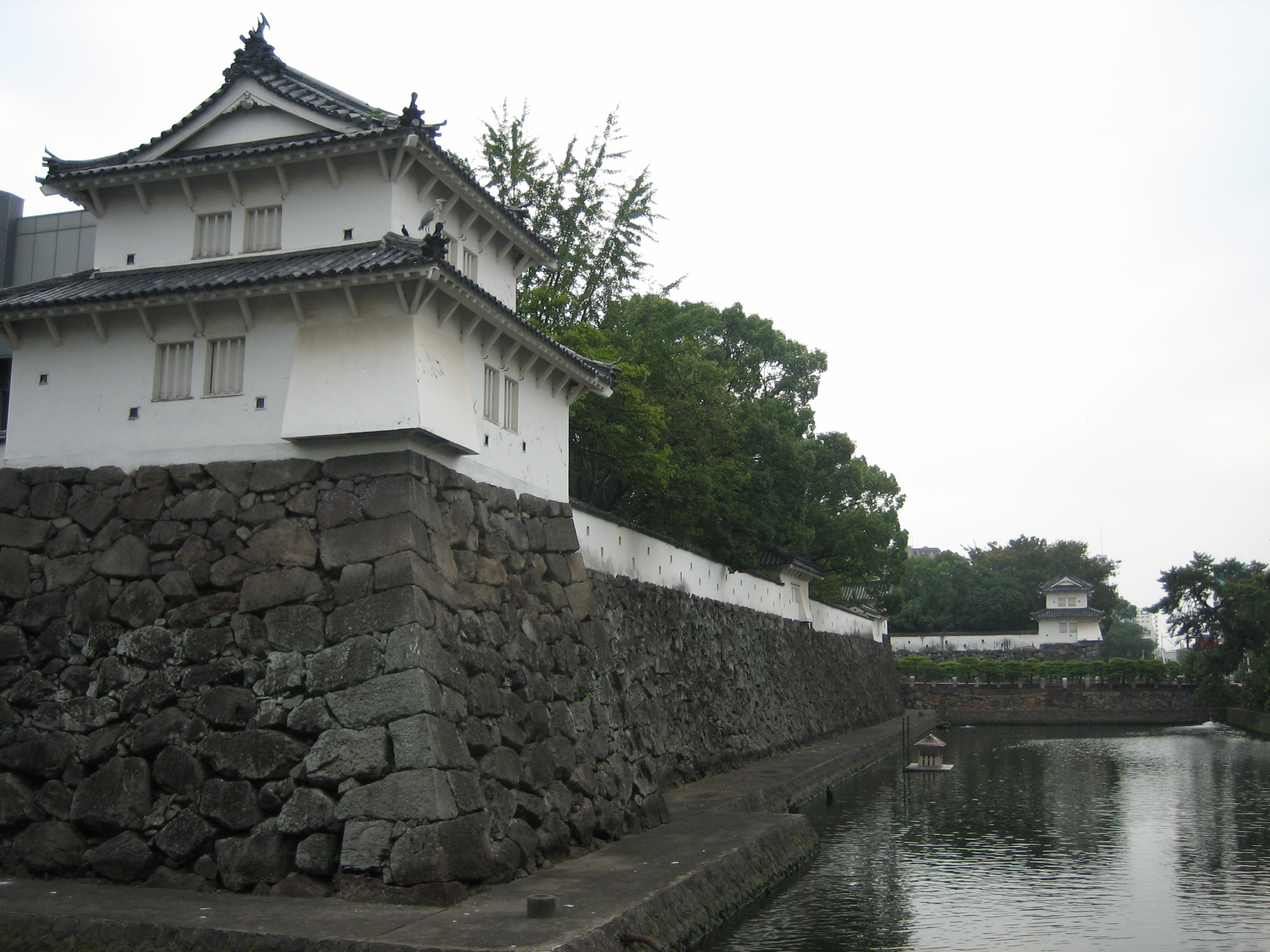
- Funai Castle

- Mon of the Ogyū-Matsudaira clan
- Capital: Funai Castle
- Area
  - Coordinates: 33°14′26.31″N 131°36′41.16″E
- Historical era: Edo period
  - Established: 1600
  - Abolition of the han system: 1871
- Contained within
  - Province: Bungo Province
- Today part of: Oita Prefecture

Location of Funai Castle
Funai Domain (Japan)

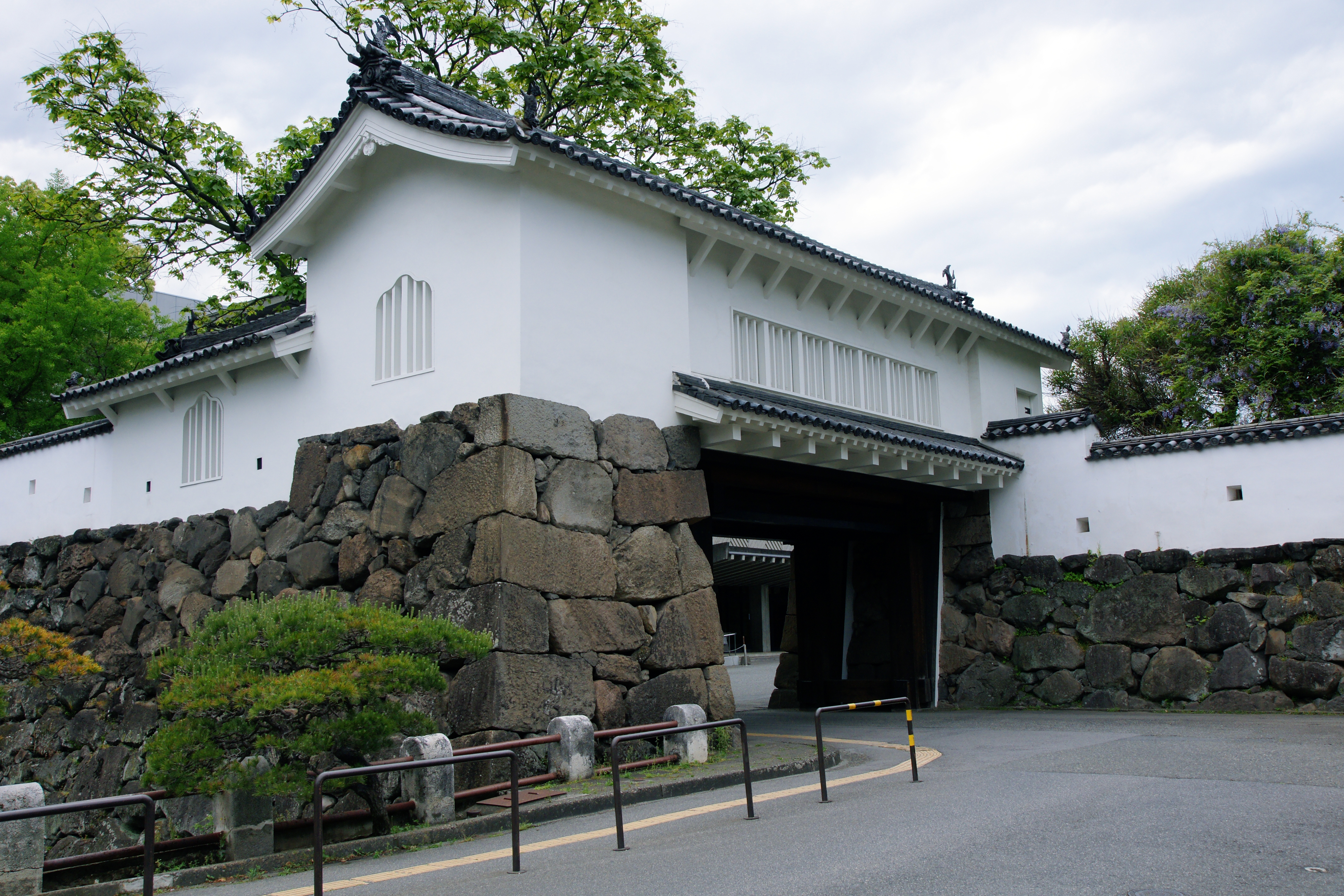
Otemon Gate of Funai Castle

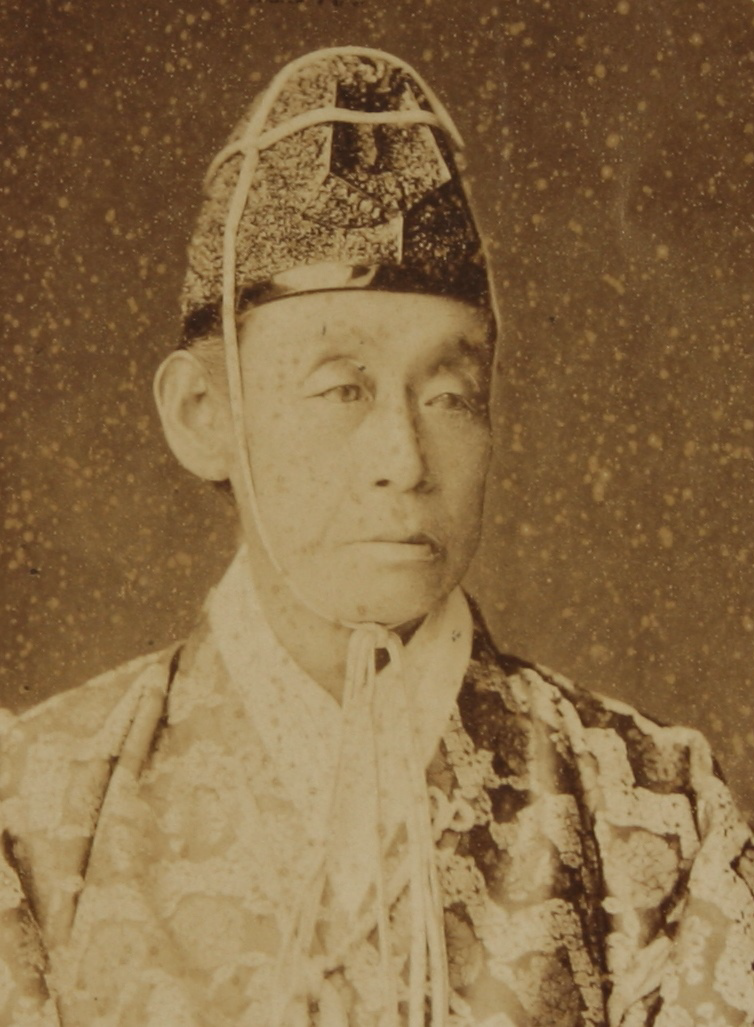
Matsudaira Chikayoshi, final daimyō of Funai

Funai Domain (府内藩, Funai-han) was a feudal domain under the Tokugawa shogunate of Edo period Japan, in what is now southern Ōita Prefecture. It was centered around Funai Castle in what is now the city of Ōita and was ruled by the fudai daimyō Ogyū-Matsudaira clan for most of its history.

== History ==
Bungo Province was under the control of the Ōtomo clan from the Kamakura period to the Sengoku period. Under the tenure of the Kirishitan warlord Ōtomo Sōrin, the Ōtomo clan invaded Hyūga Province but was defeated by the Shimazu clan from 1586, and were confined to Nyujima Castle (the predecessor of Usuki Castle). The Ōtomo were saved by Toyotomi Hideyoshi's 1586–1587 Kyūshū campaign and were allowed to reclaim Bungo province as their territory. However, Ōtomo Yoshimune (Sōrin's son) behaved in a cowardly manner during the Japanese invasions of Korea (1592–1598) which so angered Hideyoshi that they were deprived of their fief and Ōtomo Yoshimune was banished. Bungo was divided into small fiefs At the Battle of Sekigahara in 1600, Takanaka Shigetoshi, a cousin of the famous Takenaka Hanbei, initially sided with the Western Army and participated in the Siege of Tanabe, but later defected to the Eastern Army, and was rewarded by Tokugawa Ieyasu with an increase in his estates from 10,000 koku in Bungotakada to 20,000 koku in Funai. This marks the establishment of Funai Domain. Shigetoshi's son, Shigeyoshi, succeeded him and gained the favor of Tokugawa Hidetada, but was discovered to have been engaged in illicit foreign trade during the rule of Tokugawa Iemitsu and ordered to commit seppuku.

He was replaced by Himeno Yoshiakira from Mibu Domain in Shimotsuke Province in 1634; however on his death without heir in1656 the domain went into attainder. In 1658, Yoshiakira's nephew-in-law (the son of his legal wife's brother), Matsudaira Tadaaki, the daimyō of Bungo Takamatsu Domain was transferred to Funai. Throughout the remainder of the Edo period, the Ogyū-Matsudaira clan continued to rule Funai for ten generations until the Meiji restoration. In 1871, due to the abolition of the han system, Funai Domain became Funai Prefecture, and was later incorporated into Ōita Prefecture. The Ogyū-Matsudaira clan was elevated to the kazoku peerage with the title of viscount in 1884.

== Holdings at the end of the Edo period ==
As with most domains in the han system, Funai Domain consisted of several discontinuous territories calculated to provide the assigned kokudaka, based on periodic cadastral surveys and projected agricultural yields, g.

- Bungo Province
  - 6 towns and 96 villages in Ōita District

== List of daimyō ==
#	Name	Tenure	Courtesy title	Court Rank	kokudaka
Takenaka clan, 1601–1634 (Tozama)
1	Takenaka Shigetoshi (竹中重利)	1601–1615	Izu-no-kami (伊豆守)	Junior 5th Rank, Lower Grade (従五位下)	20,000 koku
2	Takenaka Shigeyoshi (竹中重義)	1615–1634	Uneme-no-kami (采女正)	Junior 5th Rank, Lower Grade (従五位下)	20,000 koku
, 1634–1656 (Tozama)
1	Himeno Yoshiakira (日根野吉明)	1634–1656	Oribe-no-tsukasa (織部正)	Junior 5th Rank, Lower Grade (従五位下)	20,000 koku
Ogyū-Matsudaira clan, 1656–1871 (Fudai)
1	Matsudaira Tadaaki (松平忠昭 )	1658–1676	Sakon-no-shōgen (左近将監)	Junior 5th Rank, Lower Grade (従五位下)	22,200 koku
2	Matsudaira Chikanobu (松平近陳)	1676–1705	Tsushima-no-kami (対馬守)	Junior 5th Rank, Lower Grade (従五位下)	22,200 koku
3	Matsudaira Chikayoshi (松平近禎)	1705–1725	Tsushima-no-kami (対馬守)	Junior 5th Rank, Lower Grade (従五位下)	22,200 koku
4	Matsudaira Chikasada (松平近貞)	1725–1745	Tsushima-no-kami (対馬守)	Junior 5th Rank, Lower Grade (従五位下)	22,200 koku
5	Matsudaira Chikanori (松平近形)	1745–1770	Shuzen-no-kami (主膳正)	Junior 5th Rank, Lower Grade (従五位下)	22,200 koku
6	Matsudaira Chikatomo (松平近儔)	1770–1804	Nagato-no-kami (長門守)	Junior 5th Rank, Lower Grade (従五位下)	22,200 koku
7	Matsudaira Chikayoshi (松平近義)	1804–1807	Shuzen-no-kami (主膳正)	Junior 5th Rank, Lower Grade (従五位下)	22,200 koku
8	Matsudaira Chikakuni (松平近訓)	1807–1831	Saemon-no-jō (左衛門尉)	Junior 5th Rank, Lower Grade (従五位下)	22,200 koku
9	Matsudaira Chikanobu (松平近信)	1831–1841	Shinano-no-kami (信濃守)	Junior 5th Rank, Lower Grade (従五位下)	22,200 koku
10	Matsudaira Chikayoshi (松平近説)	1841–1871	Saemon-no-jō (左衛門尉)	Junior 5th Rank, Lower Grade (従五位下)	22,200 koku

== See also ==
- List of Han
- Abolition of the han system
