= Naitō Yorinao =

Daimyo (1840–1879)

Naitō Yorinao 内藤頼直
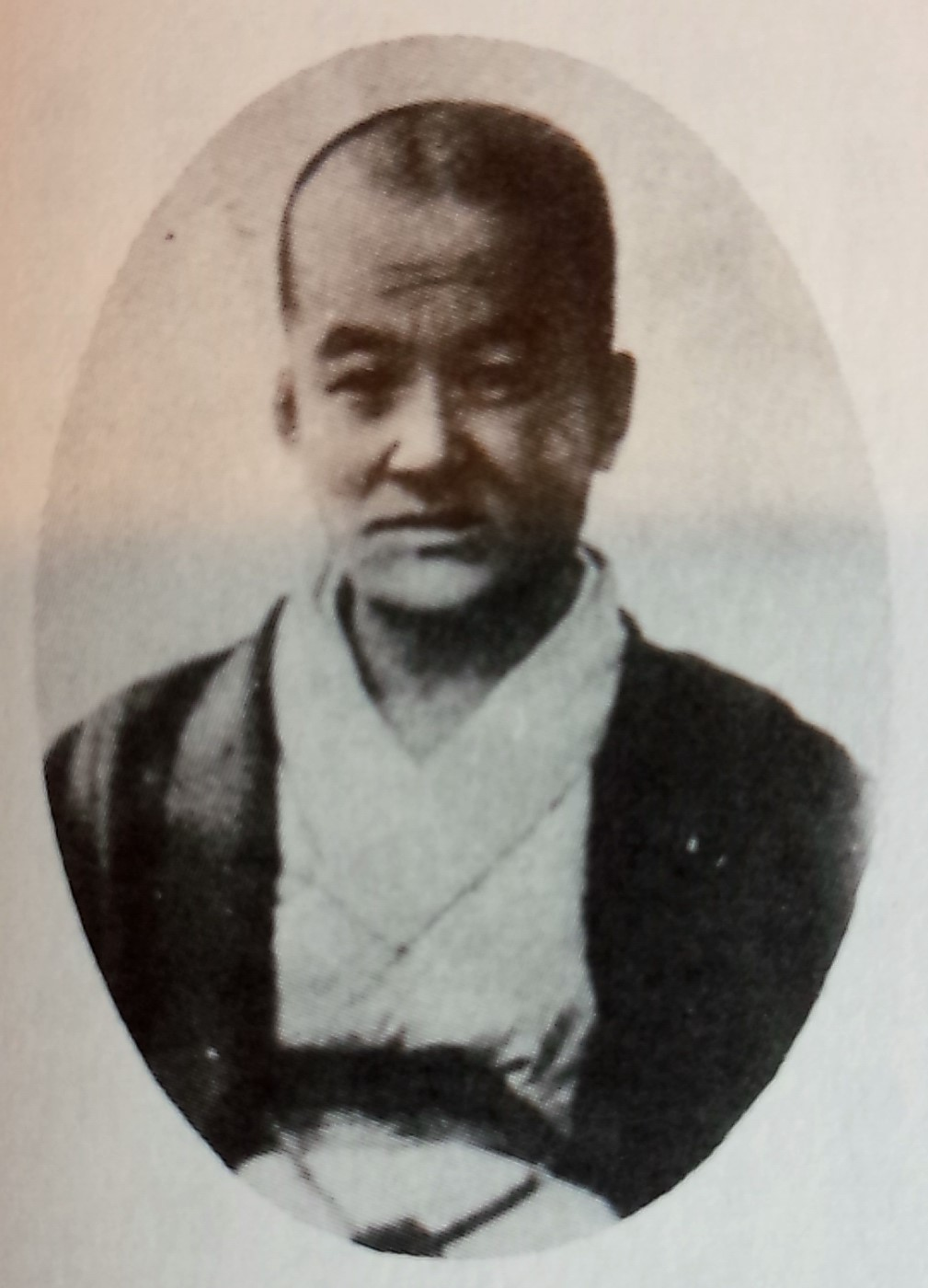
- Born: November 20, 1840
- Died: August 17, 1879 (aged 38)
- Occupation: Daimyō of Takatō Domain (1859-1871)
- Father: Naitō Yoriyasu

Naitō Yorinao (内藤頼直; November 20, 1840 – August 17, 1879) was the 8th (and final) Naitō daimyō of Takatō Domain in Shinano Province, Honshū, Japan (modern-day Nagano Prefecture) and 13th hereditary chieftain of the Takatō-Naitō clan. His courtesy title before the Meiji restoration was Yamato-no-kami, Suruga-no-kami and subsequently Wakasa-no-kami, and his Court rank was Junior Fifth Rank, Lower Grade.

== Biography ==
Naitō Yorinao was the seventh son of Naitō Yoriyasu. However, as all of his elder brothers died in childhood he became daimyō in 1859 on the retirement of his father. In 1860, he established a han school, the Shintoku-kan (進徳館) in Takatō. He served as part of the escort to Princess Kazunomiya during her travel to Edo to marry the Shogun Tokugawa Iemochi in 1861. Following the Namamugi Incident of 1862, during which British subjects were killed by the retinue of Shimazu Hisamitsu, he was ordered by the shogunate to deploy his troops to Yokohama to increase security. These troops subsequently accompanied the Shogun's forces during the First Chōshū expedition. However, with the start of the Boshin War in 1868, Takatō quickly joined the imperial side against the Tokugawa. Even so, the domain was ordered to pay 2000 ryō to the new Meiji government to help pay for war expenses. Troops from Takatō participated in the Battle of Aizu under the command of Prince Saionji Kinmochi. Yorinao was appointed imperial governor of Takatō in 1869, serving until the abolition of the han system in 1871. He relocated to Tokyo at that time, and died in 1879. His grave is at the temple of Taizō-ji in Shinjuku, Tokyo.

His wife was a daughter of Toda Tadaharu of Utsunomiya Domain.

Preceded by Naitō Yoriyasu	8th Daimyo of Takatō; 1859-1871	Succeeded by -none-]
