= Hoshina Masatoshi =

- 保科 正俊
- Hoshina Masatoshi and Takamatsu Naizen in combat

Head of Hoshina clan
- Preceded by: Hoshina Masanori
- Succeeded by: Hoshina Masanao

Personal details
- Born: 1509
- Died: 1593 (aged 84)
- Nickname: "Yari Danjo"

Military service
- Allegiance: Takeda clan
- Unit: Hoshina clan
- Battles/wars: Shinano Campaign; Battles of Kawanakajima; Kozuke Campaign; Suruga Campaign; Odawara Campaign

Hoshina Masatoshi (保科 正俊; 1509–1593) was a Japanese samurai of the Sengoku period, who served the Takeda clan. He was the head of Hoshina clan, son of Hoshina Masanori. Masatoshi served under Shingen from the latter's earliest campaigns and fought in many of battles.

He initially opposed Takeda Shingen's invasion of Shinano; however, he later submitted to Shingen and became a Takeda general, in command of 120 cavalry.

Together with Sanada Yukitaka and Kōsaka Masanobu, he was one of the three "Danjo" (Danjō stands for a formal title, Danjōchū; 弾正忠) in the Takeda clan, distinguished from the others as "Yari Danjō" (槍弾正), due to his skilled use of the spear.

Masatoshi was succeeded by his son Hoshina Masanao.

== Family ==
- Father: Hoshina Masanori
- Sons:
  - Hoshina Masanao
  - Hoshina Masakatsu
  - Naito Masaaki (1550-1588)

Preceded by Hoshina Masanori	Hoshina family head ????–????	Succeeded by Hoshina Masanao
