= Funai Castle =

Castle in Ōita, Ōita Prefecture, Japan

Coordinates: 33°14′24″N 131°36′41″E

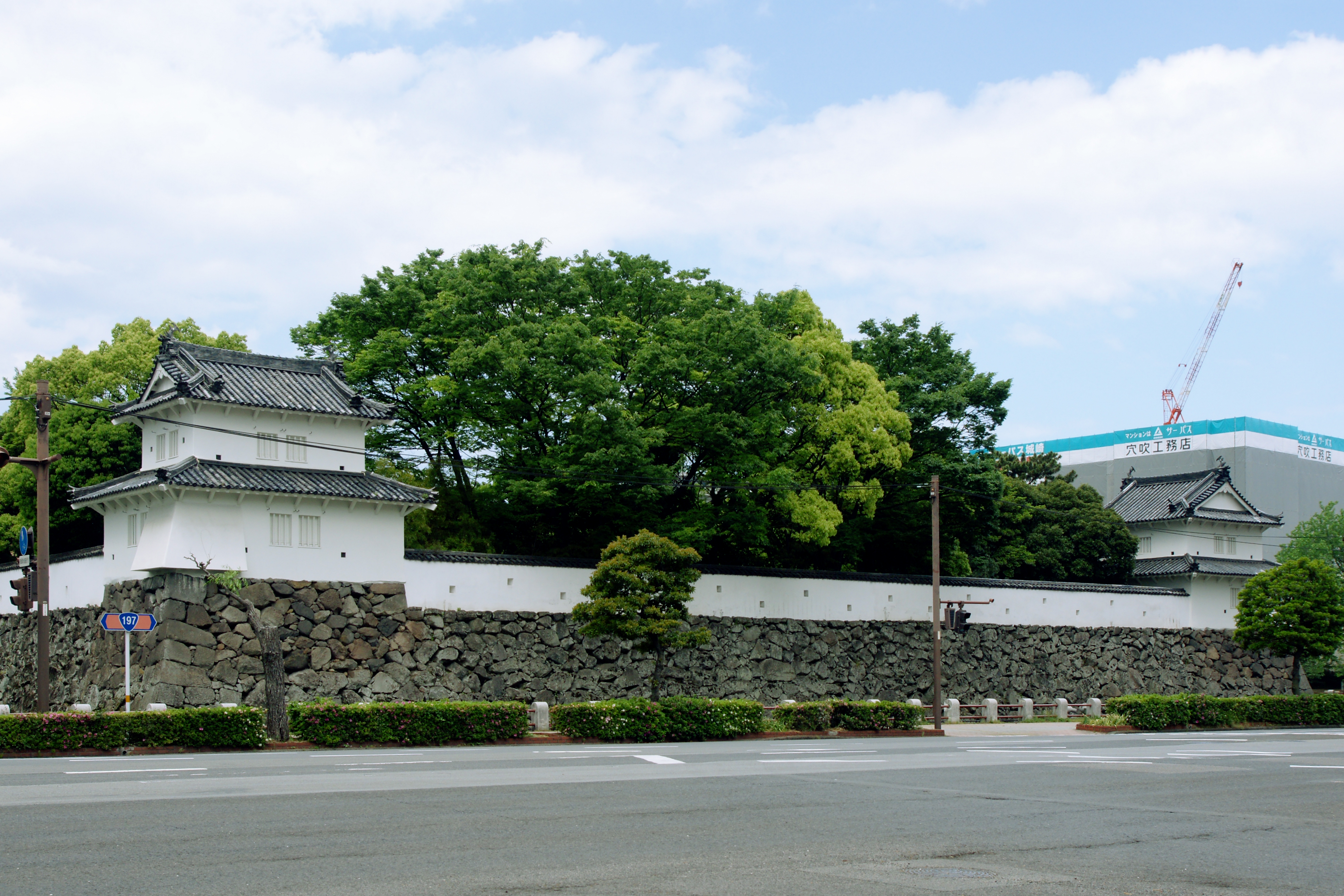
Funai Castle

Funai Castle (府内城, Funai-jō) is a 16th-century castle, located in Ōita city, Ōita Prefecture, Japan. It was built by Ōtomo Sōrin in 1562, who owned much of the surrounding Kyūshū island. The castle was originally built with several turrets (yagura), all of which were burnt down with the three-story donjon in 1743. Some parts of the castle were rebuilt in the 1800s, including two of the turrets which still stand today. The covered bridge that led to the castle over its moat, as well as three more turrets and the main castle gate, were rebuilt in the 20th century. Original remains also include parts of the stone and plaster walls, as well as the moat.

== Literature ==
- De Lange, William (2021). An Encyclopedia of Japanese Castles. Groningen: Toyo Press. pp. 600 pages. ISBN 978-9492722300.
- Schmorleitz, Morton S. (1974). Castles in Japan. Tokyo: Charles E. Tuttle Co. ISBN 0-8048-1102-4.
