= Torii Tadatsune =

Japanese daimyō

Torii Tadatsune (鳥居 忠恒, 1604 – August 7, 1636) was the son of the daimyō Torii Tadamasa; his fief reverted to the control of the shogunate when Tadatsune died without an heir.

Preceded by Torii Tadamasa	Daimyō of Yamagata; 1628–1636	Succeeded by Hoshina Masayuki
