= Yagura (tower) =

Japanese architectural element

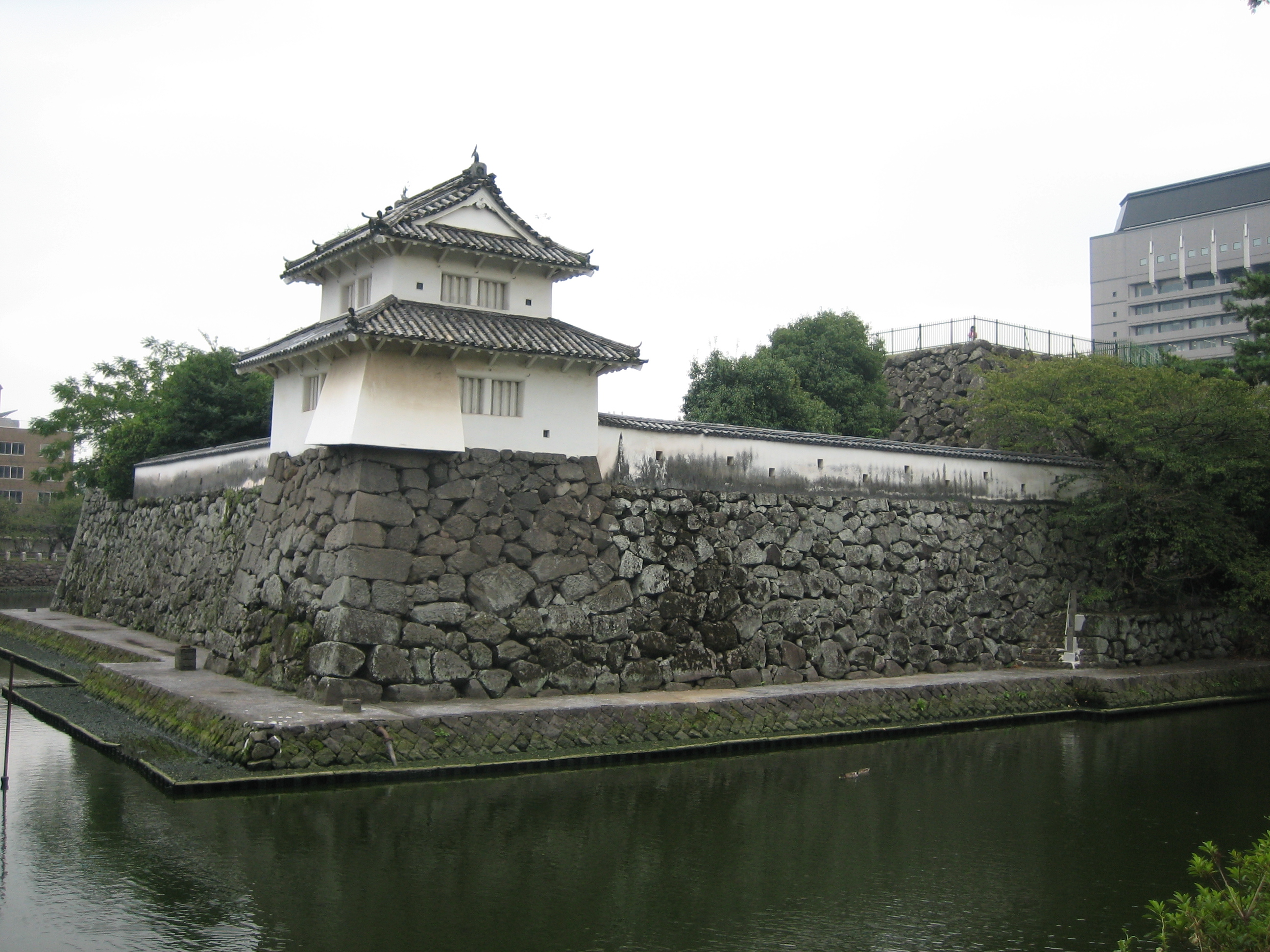
Funai Castle Hitojichi-yagura and base of the main keep tower in the honmaru

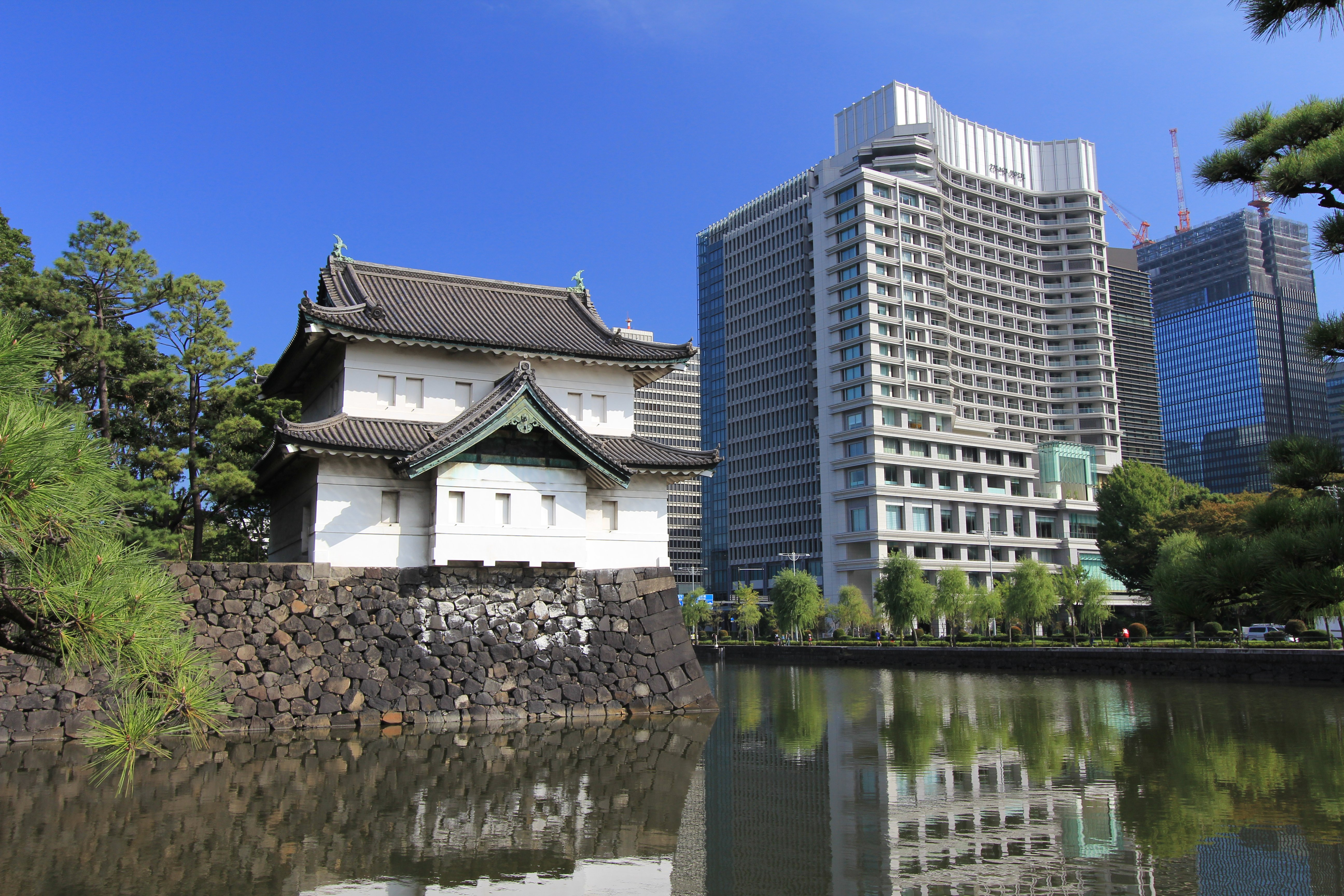
Edo Castle Tatsumi-yagura

Yagura (櫓, 矢倉) is the Japanese word for "tower", "turret", "keep", or "scaffold". The word is most often seen in reference to structures in Japanese castle compounds but can be used in other situations as well. The bandstand tower erected for Bon Festival is often called a yagura, as are similar structures used in other festivals. Yagura-daiko (taiko drumming from atop a yagura) is a traditional part of professional sumo competitions.

== Etymology ==
There were signs that the first written form of kanji was 櫓 during ancient periods, simply being a character representing a tower before being changed to 矢倉 – in which the former replaced the latter once again. The term originally derives from the use of fortress towers as high/tall or arrow (矢, ya) storehouses (倉, kura), and was thus originally written as 矢倉. The term was used for a collection of towers.

Today, modern towers such as skyscrapers or communications towers are almost exclusively referred to or named using the English-derived word tawā (タワー) and not yagura.

== Castle towers ==
Castle towers varied widely in shape, size, and purpose. Many served as watchtowers, guardtowers, and for similar military purposes. Arrows were often stored there, with other equipment. As castles served as the luxurious homes of Japan's feudal lords (the daimyō), it was not uncommon for a castle to have an astronomy tower or a tower that provided a good vantage point for enjoying the natural beauty of the scenery.

Japan has rarely feared invasion or maintained border forts. However, it is likely that guardtowers or watchtowers would have been kept, outside of larger castle compounds, at times and places throughout its history.

== Literature ==
- De Lange, William (2021). An Encyclopedia of Japanese Castles. Groningen: Toyo Press. pp. 600 pages. ISBN 978-9492722300.
- Turnbull, Stephen (2003). Japanese Castles 1540–1640. Oxford: Osprey Publishing.
- Motoo, Hinago (1986). Japanese Castles. Tokyo: Kodansha. p. 200 pages. ISBN 0-87011-766-1.
