= Torii clan =

Japanese daimyo family

Torii clan 鳥居氏
- The emblem (mon) of the Torii clan
- Home province: Shimōsa; Mutsu Province; Dewa; Shinano
- Founder: Taira no Yukinori
- Founding year: 14th century

Torii clan (鳥居氏, Torii-shi) was a Japanese daimyo family of the Sengoku and Edo periods.

== History ==
Yukinori, the founder of the Watari clan and the Torii clan, was from a family of Kumano Gongen Shinto priests in Kii Province. He was given the family name of Taira from Taira no Kiyomori, and was named Taira no Yukinori. His son Yukitada, moved to Yahagasho in Mikawa Province after the Jokyu War (1221), and changed his name to 'Watari'. During the disturbance of the Northern and Southern Courts, Watari Tadakage fought for Nitta Yoshisada of the Southern Court, and changed his name to 'Torii'.

Loyal retainers of the Tokugawa clan since the 16th century, the Torii are perhaps most famous for the bravery and valor of Torii Sune'emon, who was crucified by Takeda Katsuyori at the 1575 siege of Nagashino castle, and for Torii Mototada whose Seppuku is one of the most celebrated in the whole thousand years of Samurai history.

The family was originally granted the fief of Yahagi in Shimōsa Province in 1590. It was worth 40,000 koku. Following the establishment of the Tokugawa shogunate, in 1606 the Torii were given Iwakidaira Domain in Mutsu Province, worth 100,000 koku. Then, in 1622 they moved once more to Yamagata Domain in Dewa Province, with an annual income of 260,000 koku. Torii Tadatsune died without an heir in 1636, and his fief thus reverted to the shogunate; his brother Torii Tadaharu was given Takatō Domain in Shinano province (30,000 koku).

== Members of note ==
- Torii Tadayoshi (d. 1571)
- Torii Suneemon (d. 1575)
- Torii Mototada (1539–1600)
- Torii Tadamasa (1567–1628)
- Torii Naritsugu
- Torii Tadatsune (d. 1636)
- Torii Tadaharu (1608–1651)
- Torii Yōzō (1804–1874)
