= Hoshina clan =

The Hoshina clan (保科氏, Hoshina-shi) is a Japanese clan which claims descent from Emperor Seiwa, and is a branch of the Minamoto clan. They were famous for their role as retainers of the Takeda clan in the 16th century. In the Edo period, the clan produced two daimyō families: one ruling the Aizu domain, the other one ruling the Iino Domain. The Aizu-Matsudaira were descended from Hoshina Masayuki, a son of Tokugawa Hidetada, adopted by Hoshina Masamitsu.

Matsudaira Katamori and Hoshina Masaari, two prominent figures of the Bakumatsu period, were members of the Hoshina clan.

== Family head ==
1. Hoshina Tadanaga
2. Hoshina Naganao
3. Hoshina Nagatoki
4. Hoshina Mitsutoshi
5. Hoshina Masatomo
6. Hoshina Masatoshi
7. Hoshina Masanori
8. Hoshina Masatoshi
9. Hoshina Masanao
10. Hoshina Masamitsu
11. Hoshina Masayuki
12. Hoshina Masatsune (1647–1681)
13. Hoshina Masakata (1665–1715)
14. Hoshina Masataka (1694–1738)
15. Hoshina Masahisa (1704–1739)
16. Hoshina Masanori (1752–1815)
17. Hoshina Masayoshi (1775–1844)
18. Hoshina Masamoto (1801–1848)
19. Hoshina Masaari
20. Hoshina Masaaki
21. Hoshina Mitsumasa
22. Hoshina Masaoki
23. Hoshina Masanobu
