= Takatsukasa Fusako =

Empress consort of Japan
- Tenure: 1683–1687
- Born: 12 October 1653
- Died: 19 May 1712 (aged 58)
- Burial: Tsuki no wa no misasagi
- Spouse: Emperor Reigen (m. 1670)
- House: Imperial House of Japan
- Father: Takatsukasa Norihira

Takatsukasa Fusako (鷹司房子; October 12, 1653 – May 19, 1712), also known as Shinjōsaimon-in (新上西門院), was an empress consort of Japan. She was the consort of Emperor Reigen.

== Life ==
Her father was Takatsukasa Norihira, who had the post of sadaijin and the junior first rank (従一位). Her half-siblings by other mothers included the kampaku Takatsukasa Fusasuke, the sadaijin Kujō Kaneharu, and Takatsukasa Nobuko, the wife of Tokugawa Tsunayoshi. Another theory holds that Fusako was actually Norihira's younger sister, whom he adopted as his daughter.

=== Marriage ===
On December 1, 1670, (Note: The 21st day of the 11th month of Kanbun 9.) Fusako entered the court of Emperor Reigen, one year her junior, as a court lady. On June 23, 1673, (Note: The 9th day of the 5th month of Kanbun 13.) the palace went up in flames, and the estate of udaijin Konoe Motohiro was used as a temporary palace. This was not a new occurrence: in 1661, (Note: The 1st month of Manji 4.) during the reign of the previous emperor Emperor Go-Sai, another conflagration had led to the use of Motohiro's estate. On October 3, 1673, (Note: The 23rd day of the 8th month of Kanbun 13.) Fusako gave birth to her daughter Princess Masako (栄子内親王). In light of the great fire in Kyoto that had destroyed the palace, the era name was changed to Enpō. But on January 10, 1676, (Note: The 25th day of the 11th month of Enpō 3.) immediately after a new palace had been completed, the temporary one at Motohiro's estate caught flame in turn. Fusako and the emperor found refuge at the home of Yoshida Kaneyuki (吉田兼敬) before entering the new palace two days later.

=== Empress ===
On January 1, 1683, (Note: The 7th day of the 12th month of Tenna 2.) Fusako was proclaimed jusangō (准三后), and on December 3 (Note: The 14th day of the 2nd month of Tenna 3.) she was invested as chūgū. She thereby became the emperor's legitimate wife—during the entire Edo period, this only happened four times. Reigen abdicated the throne on May 2, 1687, (Note: The 21st day of the 3rd month of Jōkyō 4.) in favor of Crown Prince Asahito, who then became Emperor Higashiyama. Accompanying this, Fusako was bestowed the honorary name Shinjōsaimon-in. In early 1695, (Note: The 7th month of Genroku 8.) the shogunate presented her with 1,000 koku of land.

Takatsukasa Fusako died on May 19, 1712. (Note: The 14th day of the 4th month of Shōtoku 4.) Her grave is located at Tsuki no wa no misasagi in Higashiyama-ku, Kyoto.

== Notes ==
All Western dates calculated using Tsuchihashi's database via the Nengocalc tool.

Japanese royalty
Preceded by Tokugawa Masako	Empress consort of Japan; 1683–1687	Succeeded by Princess Yukiko
