= Emperor Nakamikado =

Emperor of Japan from 1709 to 1735

Emperor Nakamikado 中御門天皇
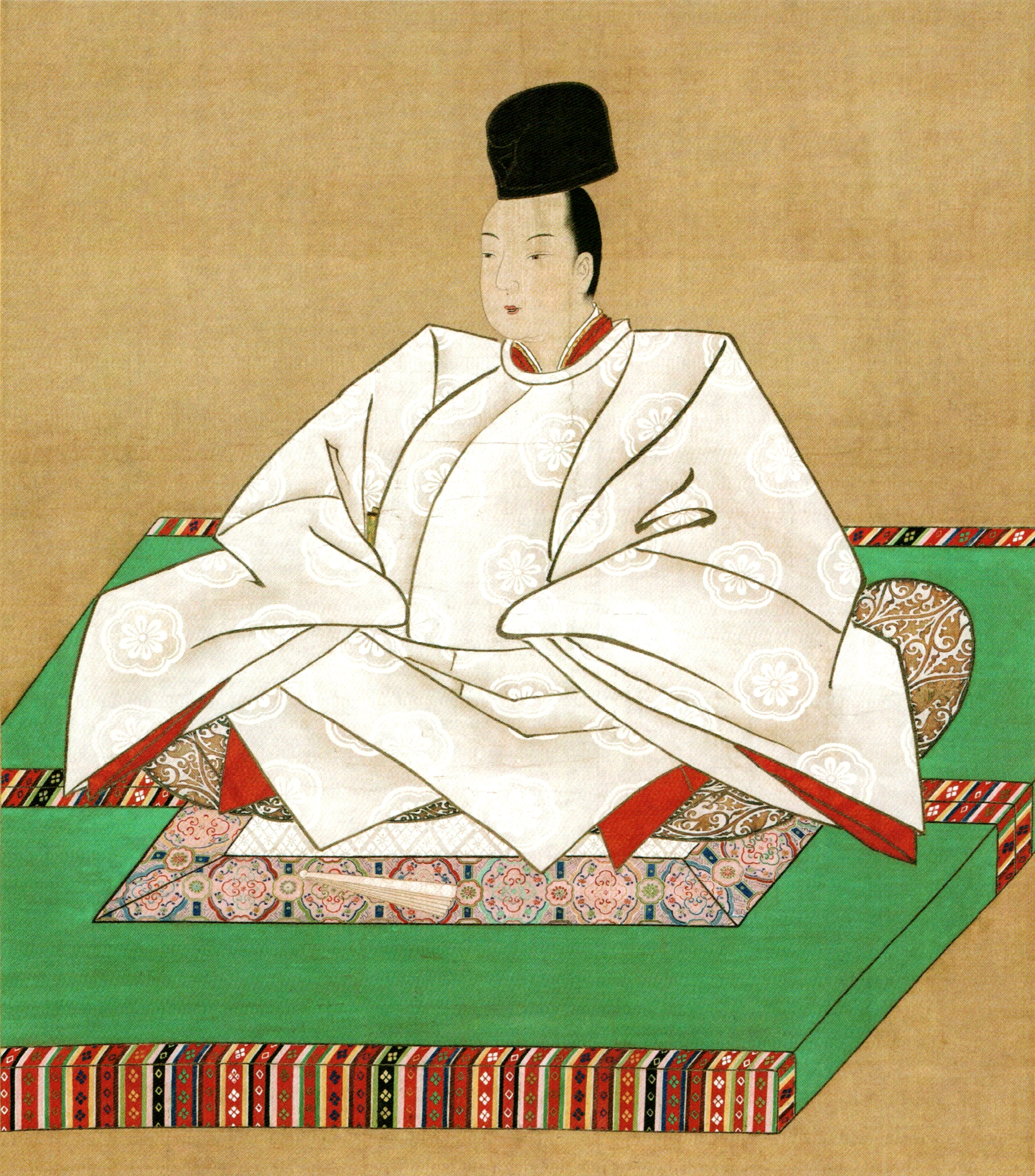
- Portrait by Kushige Takashige, 18th century

Emperor of Japan
- Reign: 27 July 1709 – 13 April 1735
- Predecessor: Higashiyama
- Successor: Sakuramachi
- Shōguns: See list: Tokugawa Ienobu (1709-1712) Tokugawa Ietsugu (1713-1716) Tokugawa Yoshimune (1716-1735)
- Born: Yasuhito (慶仁); 14 January 1702; Rinkyū-ji Temple (林丘寺), Tokugawa shogunate
- Died: 10 May 1737 (aged 35); Tokugawa shogunate
- Burial: Tsuki no wa no misasagi, Kyoto
- Spouse: Konoe Hisako
- Issue among others...: Emperor Sakuramachi
Posthumous name
- Tsuigō: Emperor Nakamikado (中御門院 or 中御門天皇)
- House: Imperial House of Japan
- Father: Emperor Higashiyama
- Mother: Kushige Yoshiko (Birth); Yukiko (Adoptive)

Emperor Nakamikado (Japanese: 中御門天皇, Hepburn: Nakamikado-tennō; 14 January 1702 – 10 May 1737), personal name Yasuhito, was the 114th emperor of Japan, according to the traditional order of succession. He was enthroned as Emperor in 1709, a reign that would last until 1735 with his abdication.

As Emperor, Nakamikado had an increasingly warmed relationship with the shogunate in part due to his father's efforts. Relations warmed up to the point of family marriage talks, but these fell through due to the sudden death of the potential Shōgun groom. Events that surrounded the Emperor included at least 2 major earthquakes, the largest Ryukyuan diplomatic mission of the Edo period, the Kyōhō Reforms, and the Kyōhō famine. It is unclear what role if any the Emperor had in these concurrent events as the role of "Emperor" was a figurehead at the time. Nakamikado's family included at least 14 children mothered by his wife, and 5 concubines. Nakamikado abdicated the throne in 1735 in favor of his first son, and died two years later.

== Events of Nakamikado's life ==
=== Early life ===
Before Nakamikado's ascension to the Chrysanthemum Throne, his personal name (imina) was Yasuhito (慶仁). He was born on January 14, 1702, and was the fifth son of Emperor Higashiyama, while his birth mother was a lady-in-waiting named Kushige Yoshiko. Due to tradition he was brought up as if he were the son of the Empress consort (Arisugawa no Yukiko). Yasuhito's Imperial family lived with him in the Dairi of the Heian Palace. The early years of Yasuhito's life were marked with disasters and incidents that included two major earthquakes, and a revenge plot involving leaderless samurai to avenge their fallen master. The two major earthquakes that took place were in 1703, and then again in 1707. The first of these is the 1703 Genroku earthquake, which caused parts of the shōgun's castle to collapse in Edo. The city was consumed by a large fire that swept through the city on the following day. In response, the era's name was changed to Hōei (meaning "Prosperous Eternity") the following year in hopes of better fortune. The second earthquake (1707 Hōei earthquake), dealt serious damage and suffering to the city of Osaka. Mt. Fuji also erupted that same year causing ash to fall on Izu, Kai, Sagami, and Musashi. In 1708, Yasuhito became Crown Prince and was given the pre-accession title of Masu-no-miya (長宮). On a particular note, Shōgun Tokugawa Tsunayoshi appointed a commission to repair and restore Imperial mausoleums shortly before his death on February 19, 1709.

=== Reign ===
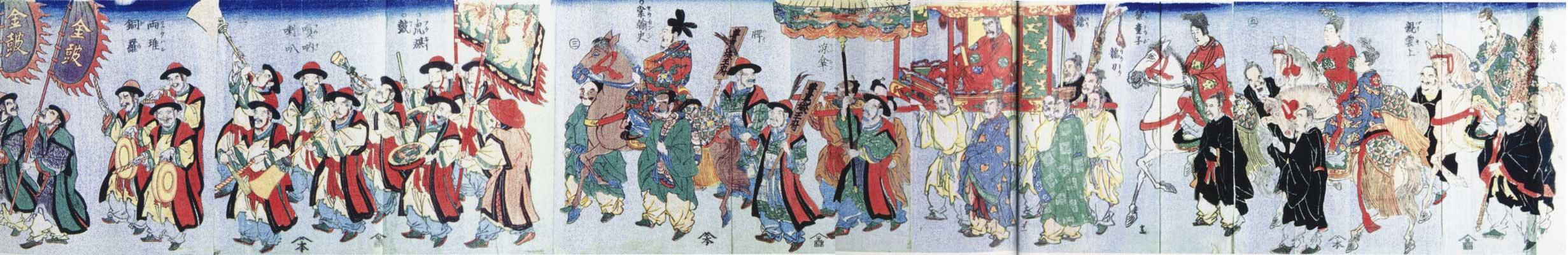
The 1832 Ryukyuan mission with a music band and officials to Edo.

Prince Yoshihito acceded to the throne on July 27, 1709, as Emperor when his father abdicated in his favor. While he held the political title of Emperor, it was in name only as the shoguns of the Tokugawa family controlled Japan. Due to his young age at the time, Imperial powers were exercised in his name by his now retired father Emperor Higashiyama. On January 16, 1710, Higashiyama died, and the imperial powers were now exercised in Nakamikado's name by his also retired grandfather Emperor Reigen. Events that took place during this transitional time included a Ryukyuan diplomatic mission, which lasted from July 7, 1710, to March 22, 1711. This particular mission was led by King Shō Eki of the Ryūkyū Kingdom, and was received by the shogunate. While this mission did not concern the young prince, this was the largest delegation in the Edo period at 168 people involved.

Nakamikado was formally enthroned as Emperor in 1711, and the era's name was changed from Hōei to Shōtoku. His reign would corresponded to the period from the sixth to the eighth shōgun. During this period, relations with the Tokugawa shogunate were fairly good in part due to former Emperor Higashiyama's warmed relationship with predecessors. Relations warmed to the point of marriage talks between Imperial Princess Yaso-no-miya Yoshiko (八十宮吉子内親王), daughter of Retired Emperor Reigen and the seventh shōgun, Tokugawa Ietsugu. These plans later became moot with the sudden death of Ietsugu at the age of six in Edo. On April 20, 1715, celebrations were held throughout the empire regarding the 100th anniversary of the death of the founding shōgun Tokugawa Ieyasu (posthumously known as Gongen-sama). After Ietsugu's death in 1716, Tokugawa Yoshimune became the next shogun. He implemented the Kyōhō reforms the following year which eventually resulted in partial success. While the Emperor had no say in these reforms, Yoshimune had the Imperial mausolea repaired in 1718.

The next several years of Nakamikado's reign saw the implementation of the shogun's reforms, by 1730 the shogunate officially recognized the Dojima Rice Market in Osaka; and government supervisors (nengyoji) are appointed to monitor the market and to collect taxes. The transactions relating to rice exchanges developed into securities exchanges, used primarily for transactions in public securities. This development of improved agriculture production caused the price of rice to fall in mid-Kyohō. Intervening factors like famine, floods and other disasters though exacerbated some of the conditions which the shōgun intended to ameliorate. On August 3, 1730, a great fire broke out in Muromachi, 3,790 houses were burnt, and over 30,000 looms in Nishi-jin were destroyed. The Kyōhō famine started in 1732 and lasted into 1733, due to swarms of locust that devastated crops in agricultural communities around the inland sea.

=== Daijō Tennō ===
Emperor Nakamikado abdicated on April 13, 1735, in favor of his son Teruhito, who became Emperor Sakuramachi. Nakamikado took on the title of Daijō Tennō (Retired Emperor), and the era's name was changed to Genbun (meaning "Original civility") to mark the occasion. Even though he was retired, Nakamikado continued to exercise Imperial powers in the same way his predecessors had done. While the Emperor had no say, a major milestone occurred in Japanese monetary history when the shogunate published an edict in 1736 regarding coinage. This edict declared that henceforth, authorized coinage in the empire would be those copper coins which were marked on the obverse with the character 文 (Genbun, also pronounced bun in Japanese). The practice of placing the name of the era on coinage continues to present day with Naruhito (令和). Nakamikado died in 1737 due to unknown causes, his kami is enshrined in an Imperial mausoleum (misasagi), Tsuki no wa no misasagi, at Sennyū-ji in Higashiyama-ku, Kyoto. Also enshrined in this location are his immediate Imperial predecessors since Emperor Go-Mizunoo – Meishō, Go-Kōmyō, Go-Sai, Reigen, and Higashiyama. Nakamikado's immediate Imperial successors, including Sakuramachi, Momozono, Go-Sakuramachi and Go-Momozono, are enshrined here as well.

== Eras and Kugyō ==
The years of Nakamikado's reign are more specifically identified by more than one era name or nengō. While Kugyō (公卿) is a collective term for the very few most powerful men attached to the court of the Emperor of Japan in pre-Meiji eras. Even during those years in which the court's actual influence outside the palace walls was minimal, the hierarchic organization persisted. In general, this elite group included only three to four men at a time. These were hereditary courtiers whose experience and background would have brought them to the pinnacle of a life's career.

The following eras occurred during Nakamikado's reign:

- Hōei (1704–1711)
- Shōtoku (1711–1716)
- Kyōhō (1716–1736)

During Nakamikado's reign, this apex of the Daijō-kan included:

- Kampaku, Konoe Iehiro
- Sadaijin
- Udaijin
- Naidaijin
- Dainagon

== Genealogy ==
Nakamikado's family included at least 14 children who were born from his wife and 5 concubines:

=== Spouse ===
Position	Name	Birth	Death	Father	Issue
Chūgū	Konoe Hisako (近衛尚子)	1702	1720	Konoe Iehiro	• First son: Imperial Prince Teruhito (later Emperor Sakuramachi)

=== Concubines ===
Name	Birth	Death	Father	Issue
Shimizutani Iwako (清水谷石子)	1703	1735	Shimizutani Sanenari	• Second son: Imperial Prince Priest Kōjyun • Fourth daughter: Princess Risyū • Sixth daughter: Princess Sonjō • Eighth daughter: Princess Chika
Iyo-no-Tsubone (伊予局)	1703	1770	Komori Yorisue	• First daughter: Princess Syōsan • Fifth son: Imperial Prince Priest Ji'nin
Gojō Hiroko (五条寛子)	1718	—N/a	Gojō Tamenori	• Sixth son: Imperial Prince Priest Jyun'nin
Sono Tsuneko (園常子)	—N/a	1763	Sono Motokatsu	• Third son: Imperial Prince Priest Cyūyo • Third daughter: Princess Go
Kuze Natsuko (久世夏子)	—N/a	1734	Kuze Michinatsu	• Second daughter: Princess Mitsu • Fifth daughter: Imperial Princess Fusako • Seventh daughter: Princess Eikō • Fifth son: Prince Nobu

=== Issue ===
Status	Name	Birth	Death	Mother	Marriage	Issue
First son	Imperial Prince Teruhito (昭仁親王) (later Emperor Sakuramachi)	1720	1750	Konoe Hisako	Nijō Ieko	• Imperial Princess Noriko • Imperial Princess Toshiko (later Empress Go-Sakuramachi) • Imperial Prince Toohito (later Emperor Momozono)
First daughter	Princess Syōsan (聖珊女王)	1721	1759	Iyo-no-Tsubone	—N/a	—N/a
Sixth son	Imperial Prince Priest Jyun'nin (遵仁法親王)	1736	1747	Gojō Hiroko	—N/a	—N/a
Second son	Imperial Prince Priest Kōjyun (公遵法親王)	1722	1788	Shimizutani Iwako	—N/a	—N/a
Third son	Imperial Prince Priest Cyūyo (忠與法親王)	1722	1788	Sono Tsuneko	—N/a	—N/a
Second daughter	Princess Mitsu (三宮) _{(stillborn daughter)}	1723	1723	Kuze Natsuko	—N/a	—N/a
Fifth son	Imperial Prince Priest Ji'nin (慈仁法親王)	1723	1735	Iyo-no-Tsubone	—N/a	—N/a
Third daughter	Princess Go (五宮)	1724	1725	Sono Tsuneko	—N/a	—N/a
Fourth daughter	Princess Risyū (理秀女王)	1725	1764	Shimizutani Iwako	—N/a	—N/a
Fifth daughter	Imperial Princess Fusako (成子内親王)	1729	1771	Kuze Natsuko	Kan'in-no-miya Sukehito	—N/a
Sixth daughter	Princess Sonjō (尊乗女王)	1730	1789	Shimizutani Iwako	—N/a	—N/a
Seventh daughter	Princess Eikō (永皎女王)	1732	1808	Kuze Natsuko	—N/a	—N/a
Sixth son	Prince Nobu (信宮) _{(stillborn son)}	1734	1734	Kuze Natsuko	—N/a	—N/a
Eighth daughter	Princess Chika (周宮) _{(stillborn daughter)}	1735	1735	Shimizutani Iwako	—N/a	—N/a

== Ancestry ==
Ancestors of Emperor Nakamikado

8. Emperor Go-Mizunoo (1596–1680)
4. Emperor Reigen (1654–1732)
9. Sono Kuniko (1624–1677)
2. Emperor Higashiyama (1675–1710)
10. Matsuki Munaeda (1625–1700)
5. Matsuki Muneko (1658–1732)
11. Kawabata Hideko
1. Emperor Nakamikado
12. Sono Munetomo (1611–1661)
6. Kushige Takayoshi (1652–1733)
13. Ikoma
3. Kushige Yoshiko (1675–1710)
14. Nishinotōin Tokinari (1645–1724)
7. Nishinotōin

== Notes ==
Japanese Imperial kamon — a stylized chrysanthemum blossom

== See also ==
- Emperor of Japan
- List of Emperors of Japan
- Imperial cult
- The Age of the Gods

Regnal titles
Preceded by Emperor Higashiyama	Emperor of Japan: Nakamikado; 1709–1735	Succeeded by Emperor Sakuramachi
