= Emperor Higashiyama =

Emperor of Japan from 1687 to 1709

Emperor Higashiyama 東山天皇
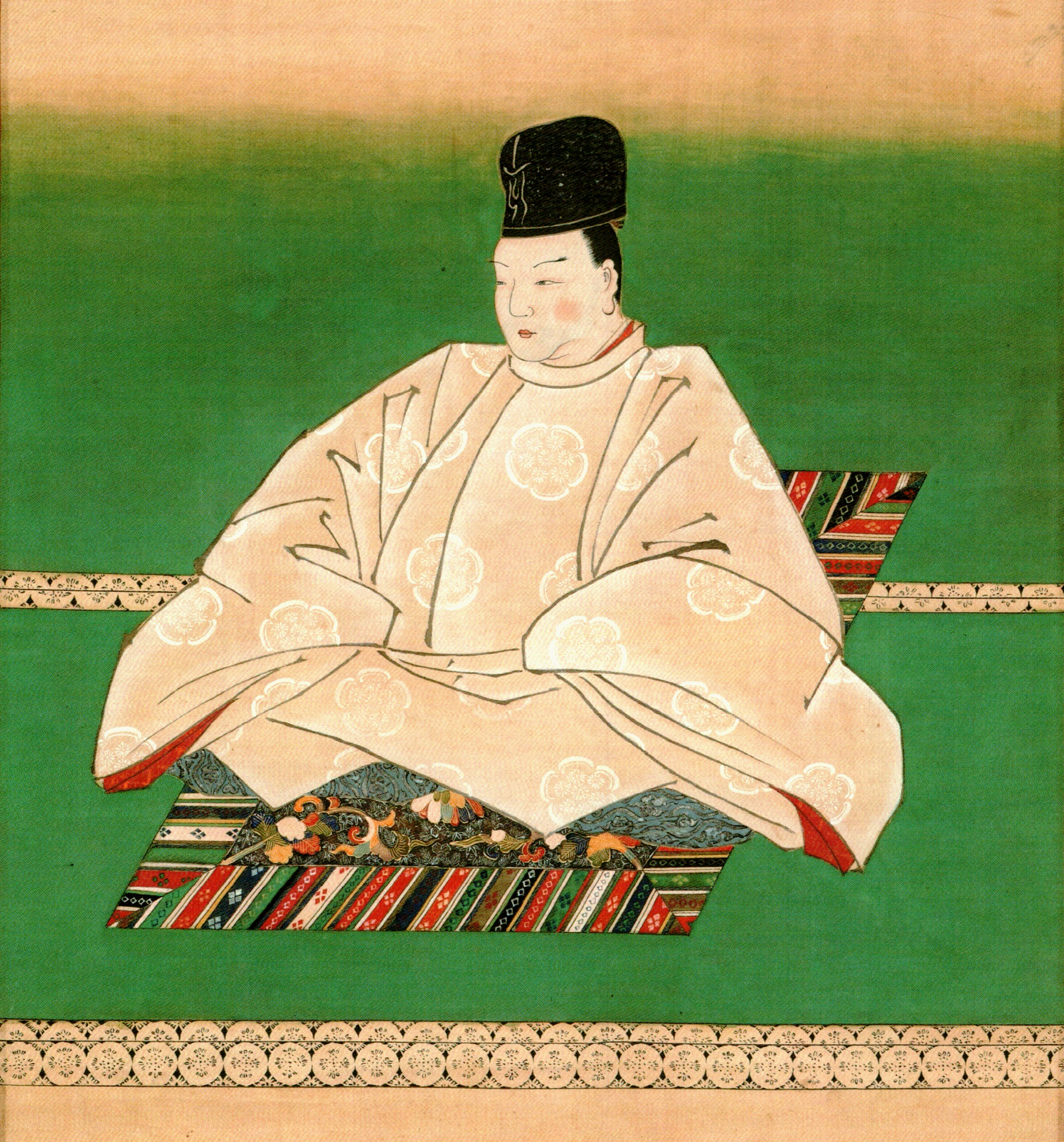
- Portrait by Prince Kōkan

Emperor of Japan
- Reign: 2 May 1687 – 27 July 1709
- Predecessor: Reigen
- Successor: Nakamikado
- Shōguns: See list: Tokugawa Tsunayoshi; Tokugawa Ienobu
- Born: Asahito (朝仁); 21 October 1675; Kyoto, Kyoto Prefecture, Tokugawa shogunate
- Died: 16 January 1710 (aged 34); Sentō Imperial Palace, Tokugawa shogunate
- Burial: Tsuki no wa no misasagi, Kyoto
- Spouse: Yukiko (m. 1697)
- Issue among others...: Emperor Nakamikado; Naohito, Prince Kan'in
Posthumous name
- Tsuigō: Emperor Higashiyama (東山院 or 東山天皇)
- House: Imperial House of Japan
- Father: Emperor Reigen
- Mother: Matsuki Muneko (biological); Takatsukasa Fusako (adoptive)

Emperor Higashiyama (東山天皇, Higashiyama-tennō; 21 October 1675 – 16 January 1710), personal name Asahito, was the 113th emperor of Japan, according to the traditional order of succession. Higashiyama's reign spanned the years from 1687 through to his abdication in 1709 corresponding to the Genroku era of the Edo period. The previous hundred years of peace and seclusion in Japan had created relative economic stability. The arts flourished, including theater and architecture.

== Events of Higashiyama's life ==
=== Early life ===
Before Higashiyama's ascension to the Chrysanthemum Throne, his personal name (imina) was Asahito (朝仁) or Tomohito. Tomohito was born on October 21, 1675, and was the fifth son of Emperor Reigen; his birth mother was a lady-in-waiting named Matsuki Muneko. While Prince Tomohito was the son of a secondary consort, he was adopted by empress Takatsukasa Fusako (chief consort or Chūgū). Tomohito's Imperial family lived with him in the Dairi of the Heian Palace. Events that took place before Tomohito became Crown Prince include a great flood that devastated Edo, a great famine that devastated Kyoto, and the Great Tenna Fire in Edo. The Shingon Buddhist temple Gokoku-ji was also founded in Edo where it remains today as one of the few sites in Tokyo that survived World War II. Tomohito-shinnō was proclaimed Crown prince in 1682, and given the pre-accession title of Go-no-miya (五宮). For the first time in over 300 years a ceremonial investiture was held for the occasion. A fire burned the Kyoto Imperial Palace to ashes in 1684 prompting reconstruction that took a year to complete. The effects from this fire on the Imperial family, if any, are unknown. Emperor Reigen's brother, former-Emperor Go-Sai, died on March 26, 1685, and a great comet was observed crossing the night sky.

=== Reign ===
Prince Tomohito acceded to the throne on May 2, 1687, as Emperor when his father abdicated in his favor, the era's name was changed from Jōkyō to Genroku to mark this event. While he held the political title of Emperor, it was in name only as the shoguns of the Tokugawa family controlled Japan. Initially, Emperor Reigen continued to rule in Higashiyama's name as a Cloistered Emperor as had been done in the Heian period. While this move caused trouble by provoking the ruling shogunate, Higashiyama's gentle character helped to improve relations with the Shōgun. This warmed relationship caused imperial property to be increased, and repairs carried out on Imperial mausoleums. Reigen meanwhile lived out his retirement in the Sentō-gosho (the palace for an ex-Emperor), and is now known for being the last "Cloistered Emperor" of Japan. On December 20, 1688, the esoteric Daijō-sai ceremony was revived because of the shogunate's insistence. This Shinto ritual had been in abeyance for over a century, and is performed only once by the emperor in the period of the enthronement ceremonies.

- 1688 (Genroku gannen): The Tokugawa shogunate revised the code of conduct for funerals (Fuku-kiju-ryō), which incorporated a code of conduct for mourning as well.
- September 16, 1689 (Genroku 2): German physician Engelbert Kaempfer arrives at Dejima for the first time. Bakufu policy in this era was designed to marginalize the influence of foreigners; and Kaempfer had to present himself as "Dutch" in dealings with the Japanese. Regardless of this minor subterfuge, an unintended and opposite consequence of sakoku was to enhance the value and significance of a very small number of thoughtful observers like Kaempfer, whose writings document what he learned or discovered first-hand. Kaempfer's published accounts and unpublished writings provided a unique and useful perspective for Orientalists and Japanologists in the 19th century; and his work continues to be rigorously examined by modern researchers today.
- 1695 (Genroku 8, 8th month): Minting begun of Genroku coinage. The shogunate placed the Japanese character gen (元) on the obverse of copper coins, the same character used today in China for the yuan. There is no connection between those uses, however.
- 1695 (Genroku 8, 11th month): First kennel is established for stray dogs in Edo. In this context, Tokugawa Tsunayoshi comes to be nicknamed the "Dog Shōgun" (犬公方, Inu-kubō).
- 1697 (Genroku 10): The fourth official map of Japan was made in this year, but it was considered to be inferior to the previous one—which had been ordered in 1605 (Shōhō 1) and completed in 1639 (Kan'ei 16). This Genroku map was corrected in 1719 (Kyōhō 4) by the mathematician Tatebe Katahiro (1644–1739), using high mountain peaks as points of reference, and was drawn to a scale of 1:21,600.
- 1697 (Genroku 10): Great fire in Edo.
- 1697 (Genroku 11): Another great fire in Edo. A new hall is constructed inside the enclosure of the Edo temple of Kan'ei-ji (which is also known as Tōeizan Kan'ei-ji or "Hiei-san of the east" after the principal temple of the Tendai Buddhist sect—that is to say, after the temple of Enryaku-ji at Mount Hiei near to Heian-kyō).
- 1703 (Genroku 15, 14th day of the 12th month): when the Akō Incident took place, in which a band of Forty-seven rōnin (leaderless samurai) avenged the death of their master Asano Naganori, due to the bloodshed, Emperor Higashiyama nearly withdrew the imperial will.
- 1703 (Genroku 16, 5th month): First performance of Chikamatsu Monzaemon's play The Love Suicides at Sonezaki.
- 1703 (Genroku 16, 28th day of the 11th month): The Great Genroku earthquake shook Edo and parts of the shōgun's castle collapsed. The following day, a vast fire spread throughout the city. Parts of Honshū's coast were battered by tsunami, and 200,000 people were either killed or injured.
- October 28, 1707 (Hōei 4, 14th day of the 10th month): 1707 Hōei earthquake. The city of Osaka suffers tremendously because of a very violent earthquake.
- November 15, 1707 (Hōei 4, 22nd day of the 10th month): An eruption of Mount Fuji; cinders and ash fell like rain in Izu, Kai, Sagami, and Musashi.
- 1708 (Hōei 5): The shogunate introduces new copper coins into circulation; and each coin is marked with the Hōei nengō name (Hōei Tsubo).
- 1708 (Hōei 5, 8th day of the 3rd month): There was a great fire in Heian-kyō.
- 1708 (Hōei 5, 8th month): Italian missionary Giovanni Sidotti landed in Yakushima, where he was promptly arrested.
- 1709 (Hōei 6): Shōgun Tsunayoshi appoints commission to repair and restore Imperial mausoleums.
- 1709 (Hōei 6, 4th month): Tokugawa Ienobu, Tsunayoshi's nephew, becomes the 6th shōgun of the Edo bakufu. and Emperor Nakamikado accedes to the throne.
- July 27, 1709 (Hōei 6, 21st day of the 6th month): Emperor Higashiyama abdicated and the throne passed to his son.
- January 16, 1710 (Hōei 6, 17th day of the 12th month): Higashiyama died.

Higashiyama is among those enshrined in the Imperial mausoleum, Tsuki no wa no misasagi, at Sennyū-ji in Higashiyama-ku, Kyoto. Also enshrined in this location are this emperor's immediate Imperial predecessors since Emperor Go-Mizunoo – Meishō, Go-Kōmyō, Go-Sai and Reigen. Higashiyama's immediate Imperial successors, including Nakamikado, Sakuramachi, Momozono, Go-Sakuramachi and Go-Momozono, are enshrined here as well.

== Eras of reign ==
The years of Higashiyama's reign are more specifically identified by more than one era name or nengō.

- Jōkyō (1684–1688)
- Genroku (1688–1704)
- Hōei (1704–1711)

== Genealogy ==
Higashiyama's family included at least 11 children.

=== Spouse ===
Position	Name	Birth	Death	Father	Issue
Chūgū	Princess Yukiko (幸子女王) (later: Shōshūmon’in - 承秋門院)	November 14, 1680	March 18, 1720	Arisugawa-no-miya Yukihito	• First daughter: Imperial Princess Akiko

=== Concubines ===
Name	Birth	Death	Father	Issue
Kushige Yoshiko (櫛笥賀子) (later: Shin-syukenmon’in - 新崇賢門院)	Unknown	Unknown	Kushige Takatomo	• First son: Prince Ichi • Second son: Prince Ni • Fourth son: Prince Hisa • Second daughter: Princess Tomi • Fifth son: Imperial Prince Yasuhito (later Emperor Nakamikado) • Sixth son: Imperial Prince Kan'in-no-miya Naohito
Reizei Tsuneko (冷泉経子)	1678	1755	Unknown	• Third son: Imperial Prince priest Kōkan
Unknown	Unknown	Unknown	Takatsuji Nagakazu (Aka: Sugawara - 菅原)	• Third daughter: Princess Kōmyōjyō'in • Fourth daughter: Princess Syōsyuku

=== Issue ===
Status	Name	Birth	Death	Mother	Marriage	Issue
First son	Prince Ichi (一宮)	1693	1694	Kushige Yoshiko	—N/a	—N/a
Second son	Prince Ni (二宮)	1696	1698	Kushige Yoshiko	—N/a	—N/a
Third son	Imperial Prince priest Kōkan (公寛法親王)	1697	1738	Reizei Tsuneko	Unknown	Unknown
First daughter	Imperial Princess Akiko (秋子内親王)	1700	1756	Princess Yukiko	Fushimi-no-miya Sadatake (Imperial Prince)	Unknown
Fourth son	Prince Hisa (寿宮)	1700	1701	Kushige Yoshiko	—N/a	—N/a
Fifth son	Imperial Prince Yasuhito (慶仁親王) (later Emperor Nakamikado)	1702	1737	Kushige Yoshiko	Konoe Hisako	• Imperial Prince Teruhito (later: Emperor Sakuramachi) • Princess Syōsan • Imperial Prince Priest Jyun'nin • among 14 children...
Second daughter	Princess Tomi (福宮)	1703	1705	Kushige Yoshiko	—N/a	—N/a
Sixth son	Prince Naohito of Kan'in-no-miya (閑院宮直仁親王)	1704	1753	Kushige Yoshiko	Saemon-no-suke Sanuki	Sukehito, Prince Kan'in (father of: Emperor Kōkaku)
Third daughter	Princess Kōmyōjyō'in (光明定院宮) (stillbirth)	1707	1707	Takatsuji Nagakazu's daughter	—N/a	—N/a
Fourth daughter	Princess Syōsyuku (聖祝女王)	1709	1721	Takatsuji Nagakazu's daughter	—N/a	—N/a

== Fictional portrayals ==
Higashiyama appears under the name of Tomohito in the novel The Samurai's Wife by author Laura Joh Rowland. In the novel, detective Sano Ichiro is sent to investigate the murder of an important official in the Imperial Court. Tomohito is labelled as a suspect, and is portrayed as a childish oaf at the start of the novel. He is later revealed to be the instigator behind a coming revolution against the Tokugawa regime, so he can seize control of Japan himself. However, his plan fails, and he is once again placed in the Imperial Palace, where he seems to have accepted his fate to never leave the palace.

== Ancestry ==
Ancestors of Emperor Higashiyama

8. Emperor Go-Yōzei (1571–1617)
4. Emperor Go-Mizunoo (1596–1680)
9. Konoe Sakiko (1575–1630)
2. Emperor Reigen (1654–1732)
10.Sono Motonari (1604–1655)
5. Sono Kuniko (1624–1677)
11. Tani
1. Emperor Higashiyama
12. Matsuki Muneyasu (1609–1646)
6. Matsuki Munaeda (1625–1700)
13. Hirohashi
3. Matsuki Muneko (1658–1732)
14. Kawabata Motohide (1606–1664)
7. Kawabata Hideko
15. Tsuchimikado

== See also ==
- Emperor of Japan
- List of Emperors of Japan
- Imperial cult

Regnal titles
Preceded by Emperor Reigen	Emperor of Japan: Higashiyama; 1687–1709	Succeeded by Emperor Nakamikado
