= Sennyū-ji =

Buddhist temple in Kyoto, Japan

Coordinates: 34°58′41″N 135°46′50″E

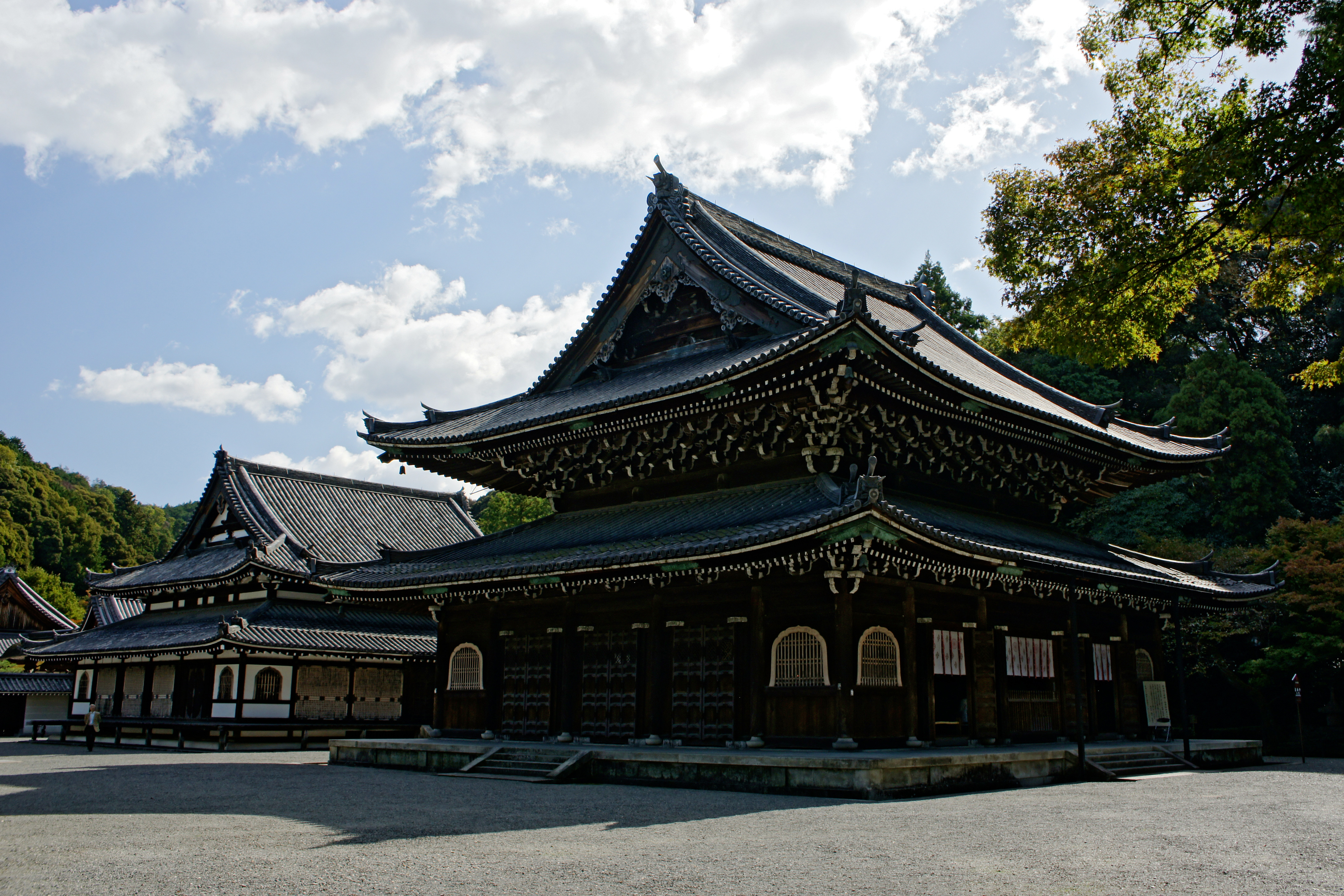
Butsuden and Shariden

A few scenes of Sennyū-ji, 2020

Sennyū-ji (泉涌寺), formerly written as Sen-yū-ji (仙遊寺), is a Shingon Buddhist temple and head of the Sennyū-ji sect in Higashiyama-ku in Kyoto, Japan. For centuries, Sennyū-ji has been a mausoleum for noble families and members of the Imperial House of Japan. Located within the temple grounds are the official tombs of Emperor Shijō and many of the emperors who came after him.

== History ==
Sennyū-ji was founded in the early Heian period. According to one tradition, it was founded as Senyū-ji (仙遊寺) in 855 at the former mountain villa of Fujiwara no Otsugu. According to another tradition, this temple was a reconstruction of an earlier temple, Hōrin-ji (法輪寺), which had been founded by Kōbō-Daishi in the Tenchō era (824–834). The major buildings in Sennyū-ji were reconstructed and enlarged in the early 13th century by the monk Tsukinowa Shunjō. The temple was enlarged by Priest Shunjo in 1218, and the large temple buildings were built in the contemporary Chinese style of the Song dynasty. Priest Shunjo traveled to China during the Song dynasty to study Buddhism.

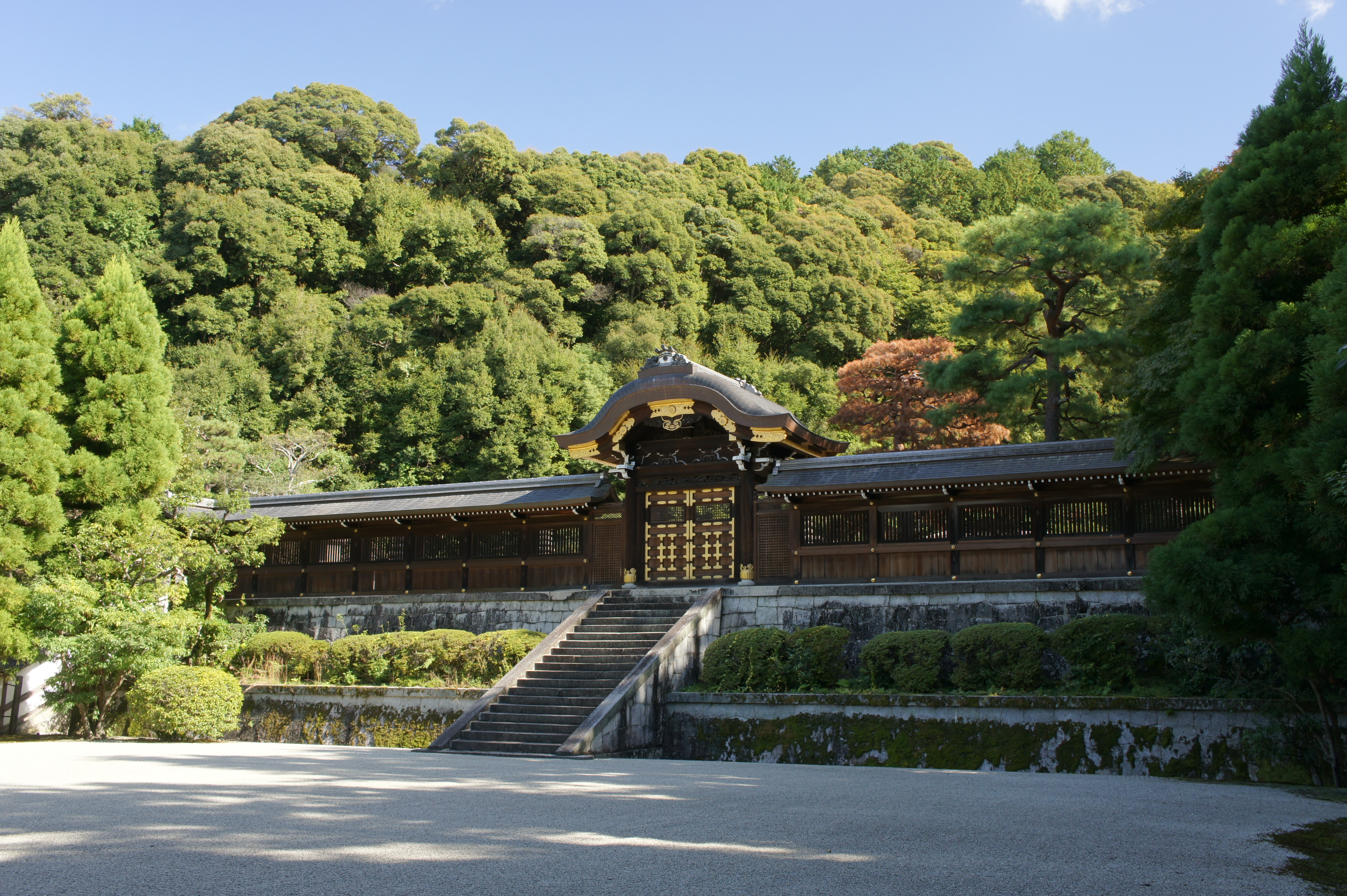
Tsukinowa no misasagi

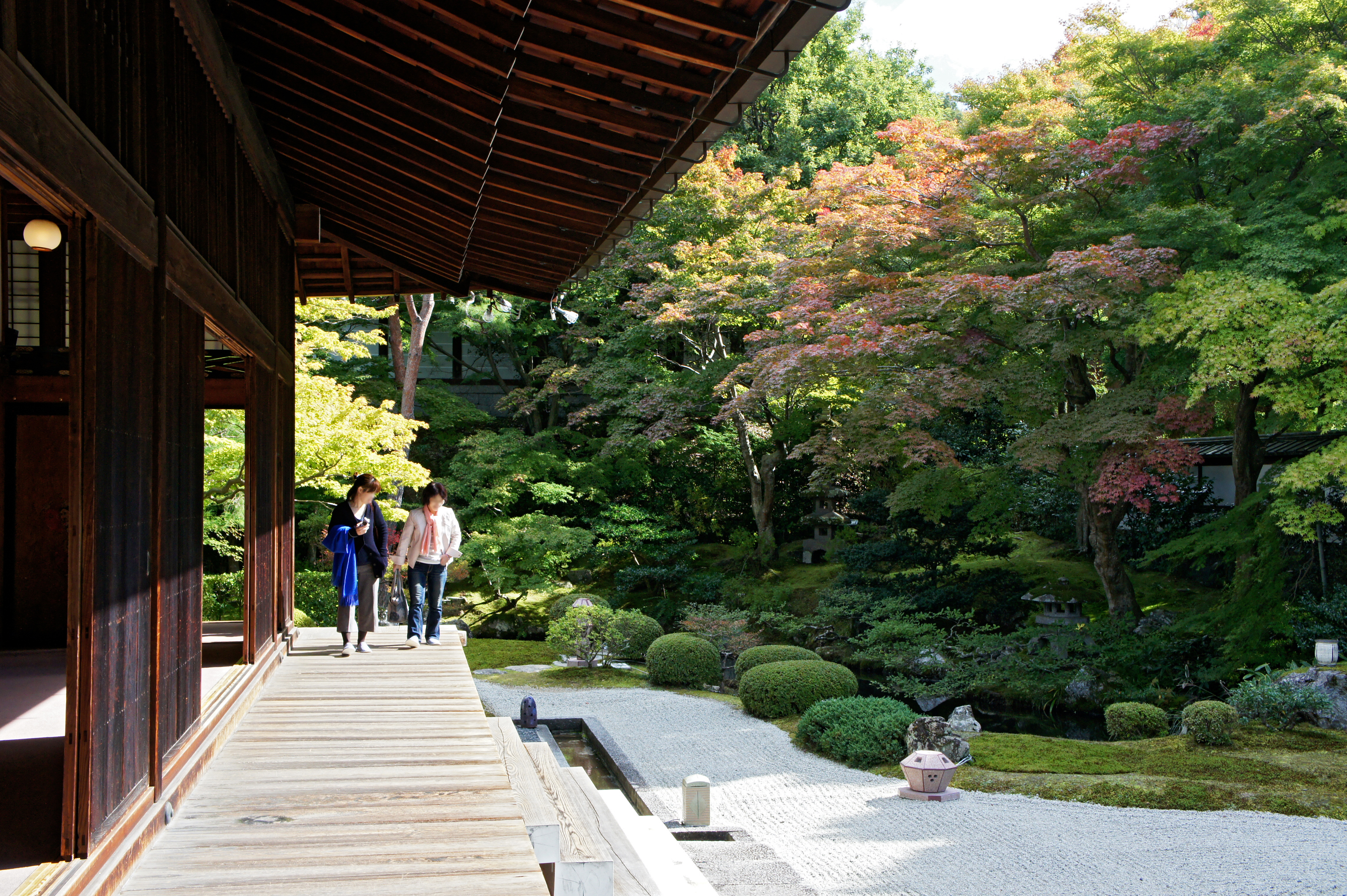
Gozasho Garden

Tsukinowa no misasagi
Emperor Go-Horikawa and Emperor Shijō were the first to be enshrined in an Imperial mausoleum at Sennyū-ji. It was called Tsukinowa no misasagi.

Go-Momozono is also enshrined in Tsukinowa no misasagi along with his immediate Imperial predecessors since Emperor Go-Mizunoo -- Meishō, Go-Kōmyō, Go-Sai, Reigen, Higashiyama, Nakamikado, Sakuramachi, Momozono and Go-Sakuramachi.

Nochi no Tsukinowa no Higashiyama no misasagi
Kokaku and Ninko are enshrined at Nochi no Tsukinowa no misasagi (後月輪陵) and Komei is also enshrined in form of kofun at Nochi no Tsukinowa no Higashiyama no misasagi (後月輪東山陵).

== Art ==
Sennyū-ji's large nehan-zu painting depicts Buddha on his death bed. This massive image (8 meters x 16 meters) is the largest in Japan. The image at nearby Tōfuku-ji is the second largest of its kind in Japan, measuring 7 meters x 14 meters. Both images are only rarely displayed, most recently in 2003 for three days only.

== See also ==
- Tsuki no wa no misasagi
- Tōfuku-ji
- Unryū-in
- List of Buddhist temples in Kyoto
- Thirteen Buddhist Sites of Kyoto
- List of National Treasures of Japan (ancient documents)
- Japanese Imperial Tombs
