= Emperor Go-Kōmyō =

Emperor of Japan from 1643 to 1654

Emperor Go-Kōmyō 後光明天皇
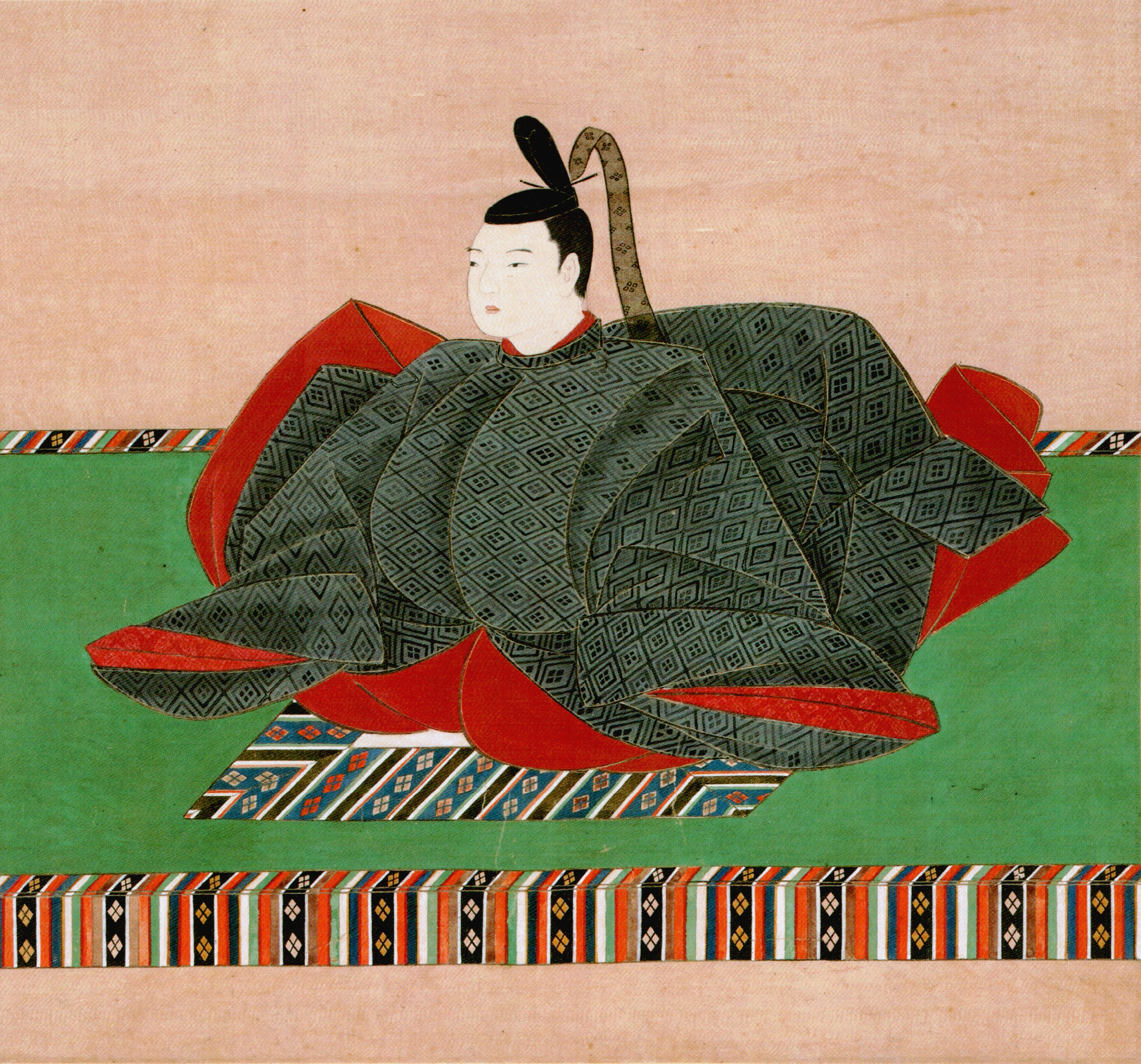
- Portrait by Otagi Michitomi, 1654

Emperor of Japan
- Reign: November 14, 1643 – October 30, 1654
- Enthronement: December 2, 1643
- Predecessor: Meishō
- Successor: Go-Sai
- Shōguns: See list: Tokugawa Iemitsu; Tokugawa Ietsuna
- Born: Tsuguhito (紹仁); April 20, 1633; Tokugawa shogunate (now Japan)
- Died: October 30, 1654 (aged 21); Tokugawa shogunate
- Burial: Tsuki no wa no misasagi, Kyoto
- Spouse: Niwata Hideko
- Issue: Princess Takako
Posthumous name
- Tsuigō: Emperor Go-Kōmyō (後光明院 or 後光明天皇)
- House: Imperial House of Japan
- Father: Emperor Go-Mizunoo
- Mother: Sono Mitsuko

Emperor Go-Kōmyō (後光明天皇, Go-Kōmyō-tennō; April 20, 1633 – October 30, 1654), personal name Tsuguhito (Japanese: 紹仁), was the 110th emperor of Japan, according to the traditional order of succession.

Go-Kōmyō's reign spanned the years from 1643 through 1654.

This 17th-century sovereign was named after the 14th-century Nanboku-chō Emperor Kōmyō and go- (後), translates as later, and thus, he could be called the "Later Emperor Kōmyō". The Japanese word go has also been translated to mean the second one, and in some older sources, this emperor may be identified as "Kōmyō, the second", or as Kōmyō II".

== Genealogy ==
Before Go-Kōmyō's accession to the Chrysanthemum Throne, his personal name (his imina) was Tsuguhito (紹仁); and his pre-accession title was Suga-no-miya (素鵞宮).

He was the fourth son of Emperor Go-Mizunoo. His mother was Fujiwara no Mitsuko, the daughter of the Minister of the Left (Sadaijin); but he was raised as if he were the son of Tōfuku-mon'in. His predecessor, Empress Meishō, was his elder paternal half-sister.

Go-Kōmyō's Imperial family lived with him in the Dairi of the Heian Palace. His family included only one daughter and no son:

- Lady-in-waiting (Naishi-no-Suke) : Niwata Hideko (d. 1685; 庭田秀子), Niwata Shigehide's daughter
  - First daughter: Imperial Princess Takako (1650–1725; 孝子内親王) later Empress Dowager Reiseimon’in (礼成門院)

== Events of Go-Kōmyō's life ==
Tsuguhito-shinnō was granted the title of Crown Prince; and the following year, he became Emperor when Empress Meishō abdicated. His sister stepped down from the throne and the succession (senso) was received by the new monarch. Shortly thereafter, Emperor Go-Kōmyō is considered to have acceded to the throne (sokui). The events during his lifetime shed light on his reign. The years of Go-Kōmyō's reign correspond with a period in which Tokugawa Iemitsu and Tokugawa Ietsuna were leaders at the pinnacle of the Tokugawa shogunate.

- April 20, 1633: The birth of an Imperial prince who will become known by the posthumous name of Go-Kōmyō-tennō.
- 1641 (Kan'ei 19): Prince Tsuguhito was named heir; and he was given the title of Crown Prince.
- 1643 (Kan'ei 20, 29th day of the 9th month): The empress ceded her throne to her brother by abdicating; and the succession (senso) was received by his younger brother.
- November 14, 1643 (Kan'ei 20, 3rd day of the 10th month): Go-Kōmyō accepted the title; and he is said to have acceded to the throne (sokui). He was age 10. His reign is considered to have begun.
- 1645 (Shōhō 2, 23rd day of the 4th month): The shōgun was elevated to the rank of sadaijin.
- 1649 (Keian 2, 20th day of the 2nd month): There was a major earthquake in Edo.
- 1651 (Keian 4): Tokugawa Ietsuna was proclaimed shōgun.
- 1652 (Keian 5, 5th month): Nihon Ōdai Ichiran is first published in Kyoto under the patronage of the tairō Sakai Tadakatsu, lord of the Obama Domain of Wakasa Province.
- 1653 (Jōō 2, 12th day of the 8th month): A violent fire destroyed a large part of the imperial palace and many temples which were nearby. Shortly thereafter, several girls, aged 12–14 years, were imprisoned for arson involving this fire as well as other fires in Kyoto.
- 1654 (Jōō 3, 6th day of the 7th month): Ingen, a Buddhist priest who would eventually become very influential, arrived at Nagasaki from China. His intention was to reform the practice of Buddhism in Japan.
- October 30, 1654 (Jōō 3, 20th day of the 9th month): The emperor died. He was buried at Sennyū-ji on the 15th day of the 10th month. There is a probability that the emperor died of smallpox.

Go-Kōmyō is among those enshrined in the imperial mausoleum, Tsuki no wa no misasagi, at Sennyū-ji in Higashiyama-ku, Kyoto. Also enshrined are Go-Kōmyō's immediate predecessors, Emperor Go-Mizunoo and Empress Meishō. Go-Kōmyō's immediate Imperial successors are also memorialized in this misasagi, including Go-Sai, Reigen, Higashiyama, Nakamikado, Sakuramachi, Momozono, Go-Sakuramachi and Go-Momozono.

=== Kugyō ===
Kugyō (公卿) is a collective term for the very few most powerful men attached to the court of the Emperor of Japan in pre-Meiji eras. Even during those years in which the court's actual influence outside the palace walls was minimal, the hierarchic organization persisted.

In general, this elite group included only three to four men at a time. These were hereditary courtiers whose experience and background would have brought them to the pinnacle of a life's career. During Go-Kōmyō's reign, this apex of the Daijō-kan included:

- Sesshō, Nijō Yasumichi, 1635–1647
- Sesshō, Kujō Michifusa, 1647
- Sesshō, Ichijō Akiyoshi, 1647
- Kampaku, Ichijō Akiyoshi, 1647–1651
- Kampaku, Konoe Hisatsugu, 1651–1653
- Kampaku, Nijō Mitsuhira, 1653–1663
- Sadaijin
- Udaijin
- Naidaijin
- Dainagon

== Eras of Go-Kōmyō's reign ==
The years of Go-Kōmyō's reign are more specifically identified by more than one era name or nengō.

- Kan'ei (1624–1644)
- Shōhō (1644–1648)
- Keian (1648–1652)
- Jōō (1652–1655)

== Ancestry ==
Ancestors of Emperor Go-Kōmyō

8. Prince Masahito (1552–1586)
4. Emperor Go-Yōzei (1571–1617)
9. Kanshūji Haruko (1553–1620)
2. Emperor Go-Mizunoo (1596–1680)
10.Konoe Sakihisa (1536–1612)
5.Konoe Sakiko (1575–1630)
11. Takeda
1. Emperor Go-Kōmyō
12. Sono Mototsugu (1526–1602)
6. Sono Mototada (1573–1613)
3. Sono Mitsuko (1602–1656)

== Notes ==
Japanese Imperial kamon — a stylized chrysanthemum blossom

== See also ==
- Imperial cult

Regnal titles
Preceded by Empress Meishō	Emperor of Japan: Go-Kōmyō; 1643–1654	Succeeded by Emperor Go-Sai
