= Emperor Reigen =

Emperor of Japan from 1663 to 1687

Emperor Reigen 霊元天皇
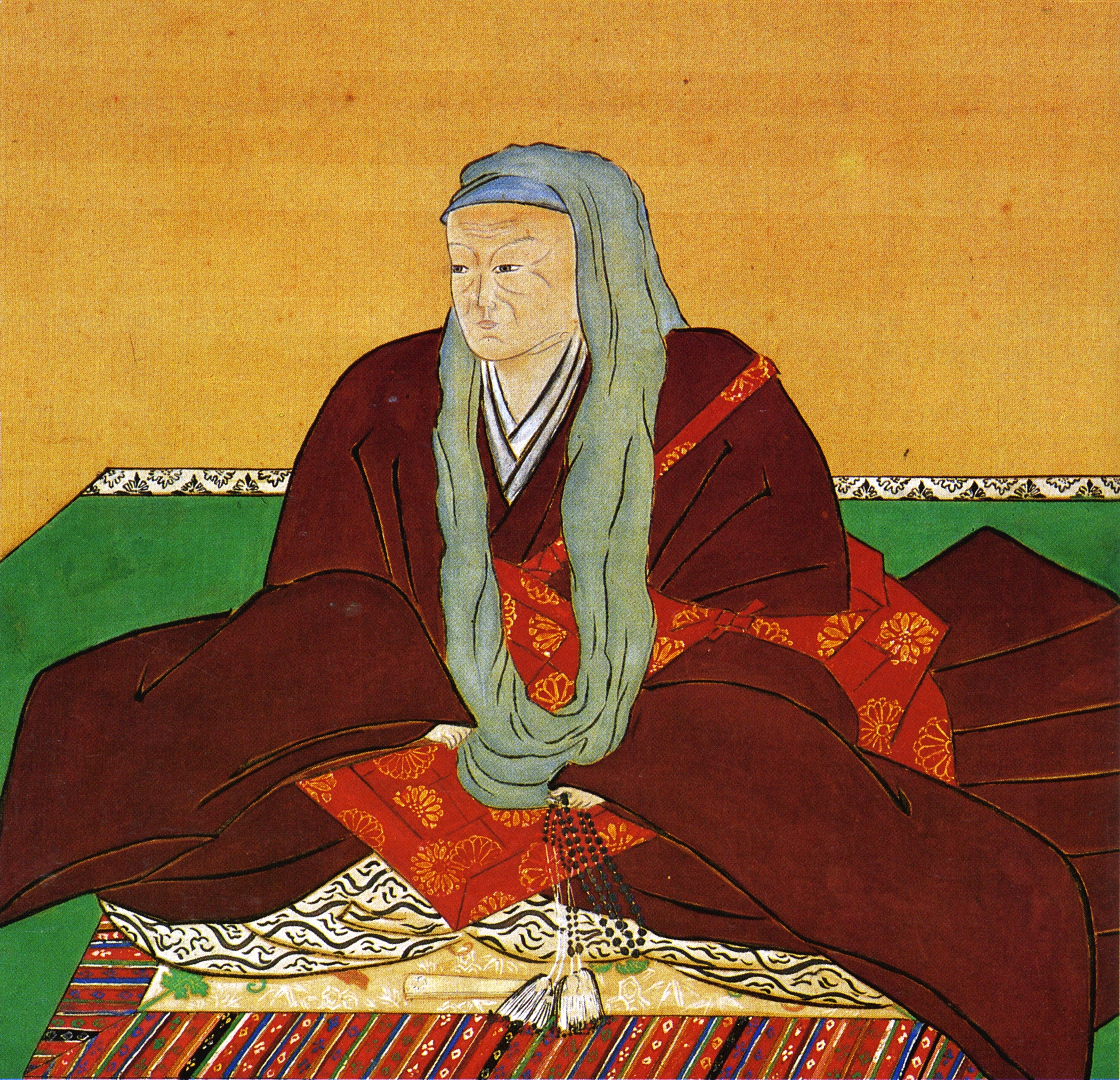

Emperor of Japan
- Reign: 5 March 1663 – 2 May 1687
- Enthronement: 2 June 1663
- Predecessor: Go-Sai
- Successor: Higashiyama
- Shōguns: See list: Tokugawa Ietsuna; Tokugawa Tsunayoshi
- Born: Satohito, Prince Ate; 9 July 1654; Tokugawa shogunate (now Japan)
- Died: 24 September 1732 (aged 78); Sentō Imperial Palace, Tokugawa shogunate
- Burial: Tsuki no wa no misasagi, Kyoto
- Spouse: Takatsukasa Fusako (m. 1670; died 1712)
- Issue among others...: Emperor Higashiyama
Posthumous name
- Tsuigō: Emperor Reigen (霊元院 or 霊元天皇)
- House: Imperial House of Japan
- Father: Emperor Go-Mizunoo
- Mother: Sono Kuniko

Emperor Reigen (Japanese: 霊元天皇, Hepburn: Reigen-tennō), personal name Satohito (識仁, 9 July 1654 – 24 September 1732), was the 112th emperor of Japan, according to the traditional order of succession. Reigen's reign spanned the years from 1663 through 1687.

== Genealogy ==
Before Reigen's ascension to the Chrysanthemum Throne, his personal name (imina) was Satohito (識仁); and his pre-accession title was Ate-no-miya (高貴宮).

Reigen was the 16th son of Emperor Go-Mizunoo. His mother was the daughter of Minister of the Center Sonomotooto (内大臣園基音), Lady-in-Waiting Kuniko (新広義門院国子).

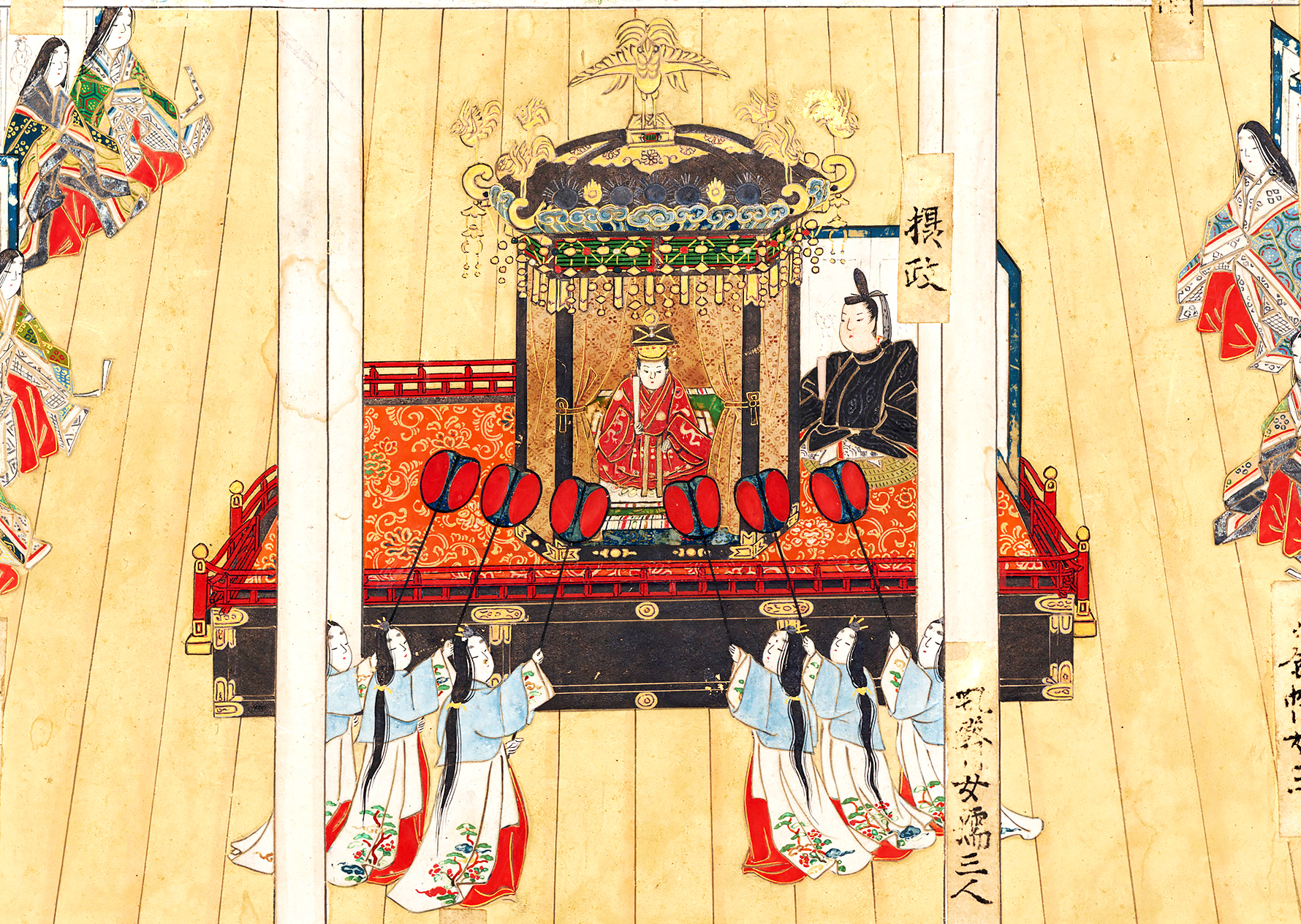
Coronation ceremony of Emperor Reigen.

Reigen's Imperial family lived with him in the Dairi of the Heian Palace. This family included at least 13 sons and 14 daughters:

- Empress: Takatsukasa Fusako (鷹司房子) later Shin-jyōsaimon’in (新上西門院), Takatsukasa Norihira’s daughter.
  - Third daughter: Imperial Princess Masako (1673–1746; 栄子内親王) married Nijo Tsunahira
- Lady-in-waiting: Bōjō Fusako (1652–1676; 坊城房子), Bōjō Toshihiro’s daughter
  - Second daughter: Imperial Princess Ken'shi (憲子内親王; 1669–1688) married Konoe Iehiro
- Lady-in-waiting: Chunagon-Naishi (1653–1691; 中納言典侍)
  - First son: Imperial Prince Priest Saishin (1671–1701; 済深法親王)
- Lady-in-waiting: Matsuki Muneko (松木宗子) later Keihōmon’in (敬法門院), Mutsuki Muneatsu’s daughter
  - Fourth son: Imperial Prince Asahito (朝仁親王), also known as Tomohito, later Emperor Higashiyama
  - Fifth daughter: Imperial Princess Tomiko (福子内親王; 1676–1707) married Imperial Prince Fushimi-no-miya Kuninaga
  - Sixth daughter: Princess Eisyū (永秀女王; 1678–1725)
  - Seventh son: Imperial Prince Kyōgoku-no-miya Ayahito (1680–1711; 京極宮文仁親王) – Seventh Kyōgoku-no-miya
  - Seventh daughter: Princess Ume (1681–1683; 梅宮)
  - Eighth daughter: Imperial Princess Katsuko (1686–1716; 勝子内親王)
  - Eighth son: Prince Kiyo (1688–1693; 清宮)
- Handmaid: Atago Fukuko (1656–1681; 愛宕福子), Atago Michitomi’s daughter
  - Second son: Imperial Prince Priest Kanryū (1672–1707; 寛隆法親王)
  - Fourth daughter: Princess Tsuna (1675–1677; 綱宮)
- Handmaid: Gojō Yōko (1660–1683; 五条庸子), Gojō Tametsune’s daughter
  - Third son: Prince San (1675–1677; 三宮)
  - Fifth son: Imperial Prince Priest Gyōen (1676–1718; 尭延法親王)
  - Sixth son: Prince Tairei'in (1679; 台嶺院宮)
- Handmaid: Higashikuze Hiroko (1672–1752; 東久世博子), Higashikuze Michikado’s daughter
  - Eleventh son: Prince Toku (1692–1693; 徳宮)
  - Twelfth son: Prince Riki (1697; 力宮)
- Court lady: Onaikouji-no-Tsubone (?–1674; 多奈井小路局), Nishinotōin Tokinaga‘s Daughter
  - First daughter: Princess Chikōin (1669; 知光院宮)
- Court lady: Gojō Tsuneko (1673–?; 五条経子), Gojō Tametsune’s daughter
  - Ninth son: Prince Saku (1689–1692; 作宮)
  - Tenth son: Imperial Prince Priest Syō'ou (1690–1712; 性応法親王)
  - Ninth daughter: Princess Bunki (1693–1702; 文喜女王)
  - Tenth daughter: Princess Gensyū (1696–1752; 元秀女王)
- Court lady: Tōshikibu-no-Tsubone (d.1746; 藤式部局), Reizei Sadaatsu‘s Daughter
  - Thirteenth son: Imperial Prince Priest Sonsyō (1699–1746; 尊賞法親王)
  - Eleventh daughter: Princess Bun'ō (1702–1754; 文応女王)
- Court lady: Irie Itsuko (?–1763; 入江伊津子), Irie Sukenao’s daughter
  - Fourteenth son: Prince Kachi (1709–1713; 嘉智宮)
  - Twelfth daughter: Princess Tome (1711–1712; 留宮)
- Court lady: Chūjō-no-Tsubone (1691–1753; 中将局), Kurahashi Yasusada‘s Daughter
  - Fifteenth son: Prince Mine (1710–1713; 峯宮)
- Court lady: Matsumuro Atsuko (?–1746; 松室敦子), Matsumuro Shigeatsu’s daughter
  - Sixteenth son: Imperial Prince Arisugawa-no-miya Yorihito (1713–1769; 有栖川宮職仁親王) – Fifth Arisugawa-no-miya
  - Thirteenth daughter: Imperial Princess Yoshiko (吉子内親王, 1714–1758), betrothed to shōgun Tokugawa Ietsugu
  - Eighteenth son: Imperial Prince Priest Gyōkyō (1717–1764; 尭恭法親王)
- Court lady: Shōshō-no-Tsubone (1702–1728; 少将局), Minami Suketada’s daughter
  - Fourteenth daughter: Princess Yae (1721–1723; 八重宮)
- Court lady:Matsumuro Nakako (1707–1751; 松室仲子), Matsumuro Shigenaka’s daughter
  - Seventeenth son: Imperial Prince Priest Son'in (1715–1740; 尊胤法親王)

His posthumous name was created during the Meiji Era by combining the kanji from the names of two previous Emperors, Emperor Kōrei (孝霊) and Emperor Kōgen (孝元).

== Events of Reigen's life ==
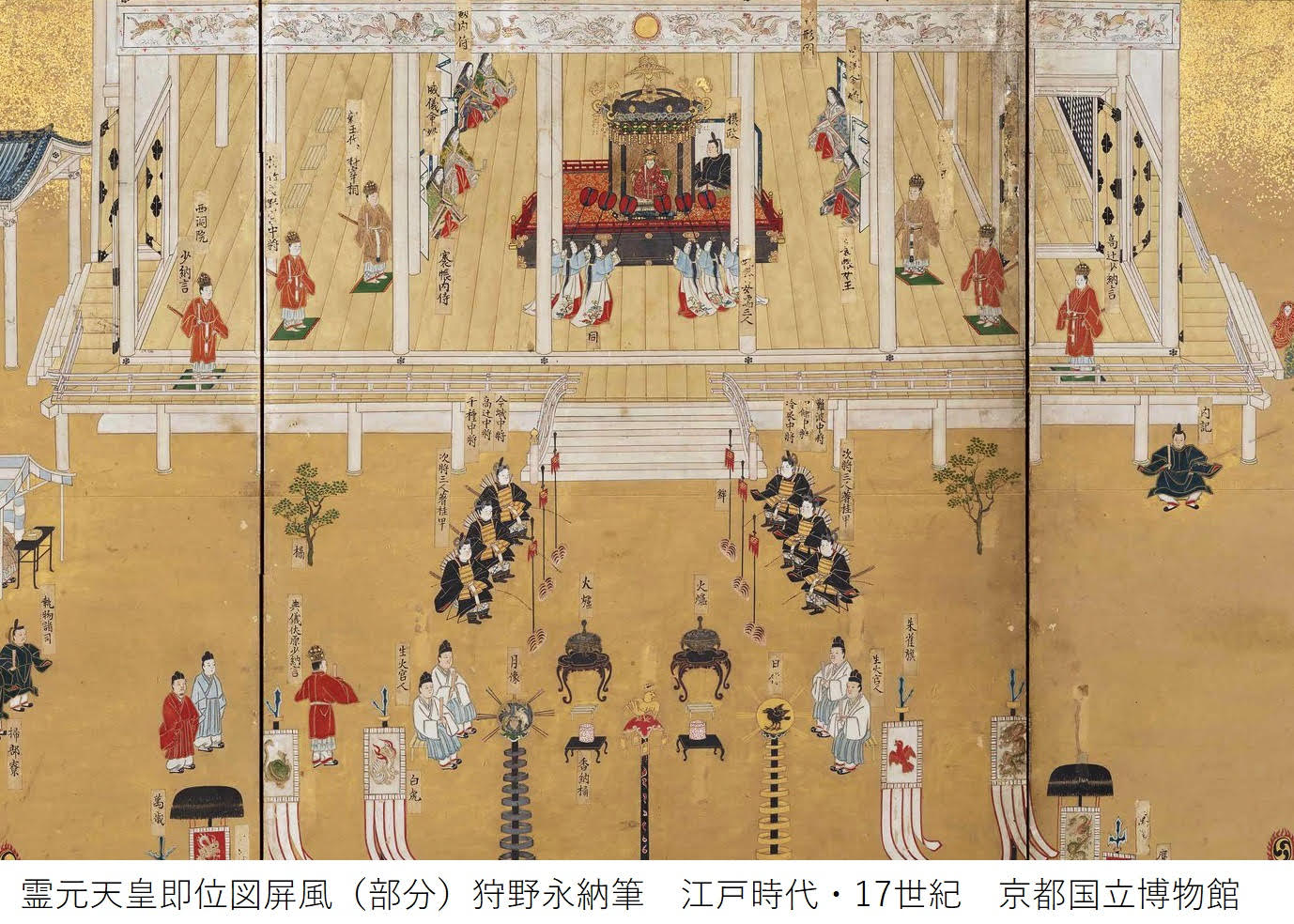
Coronation of emperor Reigen

- 9 July 1654: The birth of an Imperial prince who will become known by the posthumous name of Reigen-tennō.
- 1654: Prince Satohito, who is also known as Ate-no-miya, is named as heir before the death of his eldest brother, Emperor Go-Kōmyō; however, the young prince is considered too young to become emperor. It is decided that until the young heir grows older, his elder brother will accede to the throne as Emperor Go-Sai.
- 5 March 1663 (Kanbun 3, 26th day of the 1st month): Emperor Go-Sai abdicated; and Prince Satohito received the succession (senso). Shortly thereafter, Emperor Reigen formally acceded (sokui) and his reign began.
- 1665 (Kanbun 5, 6th month): Courts of inquisition were established in all the villages of Japan. These courts were charged with discovering and eliminating any vestiges of Christianity in each community.
- 1666 (Kanbun 6, 4th month): Hokke shu Buddhist religious practices are preserved for those who believe that their spiritual and moral purity may be tainted by close association with others.

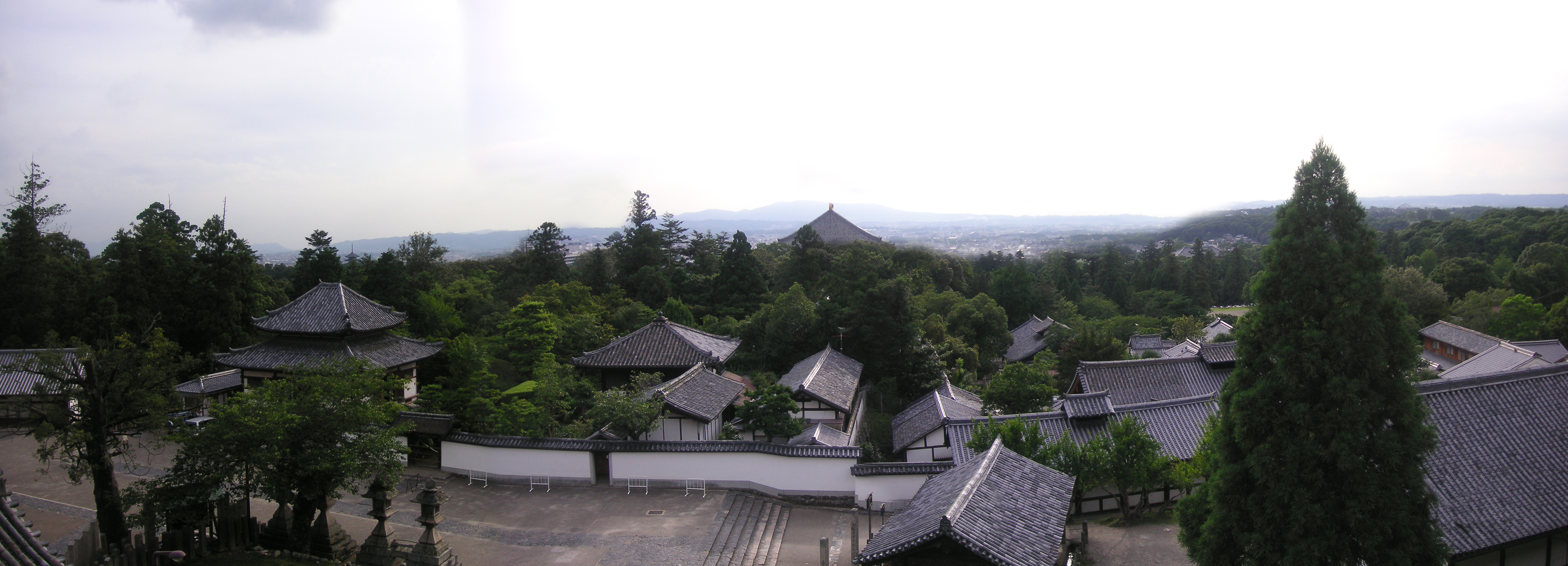
View across the roof of Tōdai-ji becomes a panoramic vista as seen from the elevated walkway of Nigatsu-dō.

- 1667 (Kanbun 7): After fire destroyed the main temple structure, work on rebuilding Nigatsu-dō (二月堂) at Nara commenced.
- 13 February 1668 (Kanbun 8, 1st day of the 2nd month): A great fire broke out in Edo—a conflagration lasting 45 days. The disastrous fire was attributed to arson.
- 1669 (Kanbun 9):There was a famine in this year; and a military expedition was sent to northern Honshū against Shakushain's Revolt.
- 1673 (Enpō 1): There was a great fire in Kyoto.
- 21 May 1673 (Enpō 1, 5th day of the 4th month): The Chinese Buddhist teacher Ingen dies in the Ōbaku Zen temple, Manpuku-ji at Uji.
- 1675 (Enpō 3): There was a great fire in Kyoto.
- 4 June 1680 (Enpō 8, 8th day of the 5th month): Shōgun Ietsuna dies; and he is succeeded by Tokugawa Tsunayoshi.
- 15 June 1680 (Enpō 8, 19th day of the 5th month): Former-Emperor Go-Mizunoo died.
- 1680 (Enpō 8, 8th month): A great flood devastates Edo.
- 1680 (Enpō 8): Gokoku-ji is founded in Edo.
- 1681 (Tenna 1): Tsunayoshi's investiture as shōgun.
- 5 February 1682 (Tenna 1, 28th day of the 12th month): A great fire sweeps through Edo.
- 1681 (Tenna 2): A great famine devastates Kyoto and the surrounding area.
- 1682 (Tenna 3): Tomohito-shinnō is proclaimed Crown Prince; and the ceremonial investiture is held (after being in abeyance for over 300 years).
- 26 March 1685 (Jōkyō 2, 22nd day of the 2nd month): Former-Emperor Go-Sai died; and a great comet was observed crossing the night sky.
- 2 May 1687 (Jōkyō 4, 21st day of the 3rd month): Emperor Reigen abdicates in favor of his fifth son who will come to be known as Emperor Higashiyama.
- 1687: Former-Emperor Reigen begins to rule as a cloistered emperor; and after abdication, Reigen's new home will be called the Sentō-gosho (the palace for an ex-Emperor).
- 4 December 1696 Former Empress Meishō died.
- 1713: Former-Emperor Reigen enters a monastery under the name Sojō (素浄)
- 1715: Former-Emperor Reigen's 13th daughter, Princess Yoshiko (1714-1758) married seventh Tokugawa shōgun Ietsugu
- 1716: The seventh Tokugawa shōgun Ietsugu died, he was aged 7
- 24 September 1732 (Kyōhō 17, 24th day of the 9th month): Reigen died; he was age 78.

Emperor Reigen's memory is honored and preserved at his designated Imperial mausoleum (misasagi), Tsuki no wa no misasagi at Sennyū-ji in Higashiyama-ku, Kyoto. His immediate Imperial predecessors since Emperor Go-Mizunoo – Meishō, Go-Kōmyō and Go-Sai are also enshrined along with his immediate Imperial successors, including Higashiyama, Nakamikado, Sakuramachi, Momozono, Go-Sakuramachi and Go-Momozono.

=== Kugyō ===
Kugyō (公卿) is a collective term for the very few most powerful men attached to the court of the Emperor of Japan in pre-Meiji eras. Even during those years in which the court's actual influence outside the palace walls was minimal, the hierarchic organization persisted.

In general, this elite group included only three to four men at a time. These were hereditary courtiers whose experience and background would have brought them to the pinnacle of a life's career. During Reigen's reign, this apex of the Daijō-kan included:

- Sesshō, Nijō Mitsuhira, 1663–1664
- Sessho, Takatsukasa Fusasuke, 1664–1668
- Kampaku, Takatsukasa Fusasuke, 1668–1682
- Kampaku, Ichijō Kaneteru, 1682–1687
- Sadaijin
- Udaijin
- Naidaijin
- Dainagon

== Eras of Reigen's reign ==
The years of Reigen's reign are more specifically identified by more than one era name or nengō.

- Kanbun (1661–1673)
- Enpō (1673–1681)
- Tenna (1681–1684)
- Jōkyō (1684–1688)

== Ancestry ==
Ancestors of Emperor Reigen

8. Prince Masahito (1552–1586)
4. Emperor Go-Yōzei (1571–1617)
9. Kanshūji Haruko (1553–1620)
2. Emperor Go-Mizunoo (1596–1680)
10.Konoe Sakihisa (1536–1612)
5.Konoe Sakiko (1575–1630)
11. Takeda
1. Emperor Reigen
12. Sono Mototada (1573–1613)
6.Sono Motonari (1604–1655)
3. Sono Kuniko (1624–1677)
14. Tani Moritomo, 1st Lord of Yamaga (1563–1628)
7. Tani
15. Kinoshita

== Notes ==
Japanese Imperial kamon — a stylized chrysanthemum blossom

== See also ==
- Emperor of Japan
- List of Emperors of Japan
- Imperial cult

Regnal titles
Preceded by Emperor Go-Sai	Emperor of Japan: Reigen; 1663–1687	Succeeded by Emperor Higashiyama
