= Tokugawa Tsunayoshi =

Japanese Samurai, Daimyo and Military leader of Japan from 1680 to 1709

Senior First Rank Tokugawa Tsunayoshi
- 徳川 綱吉
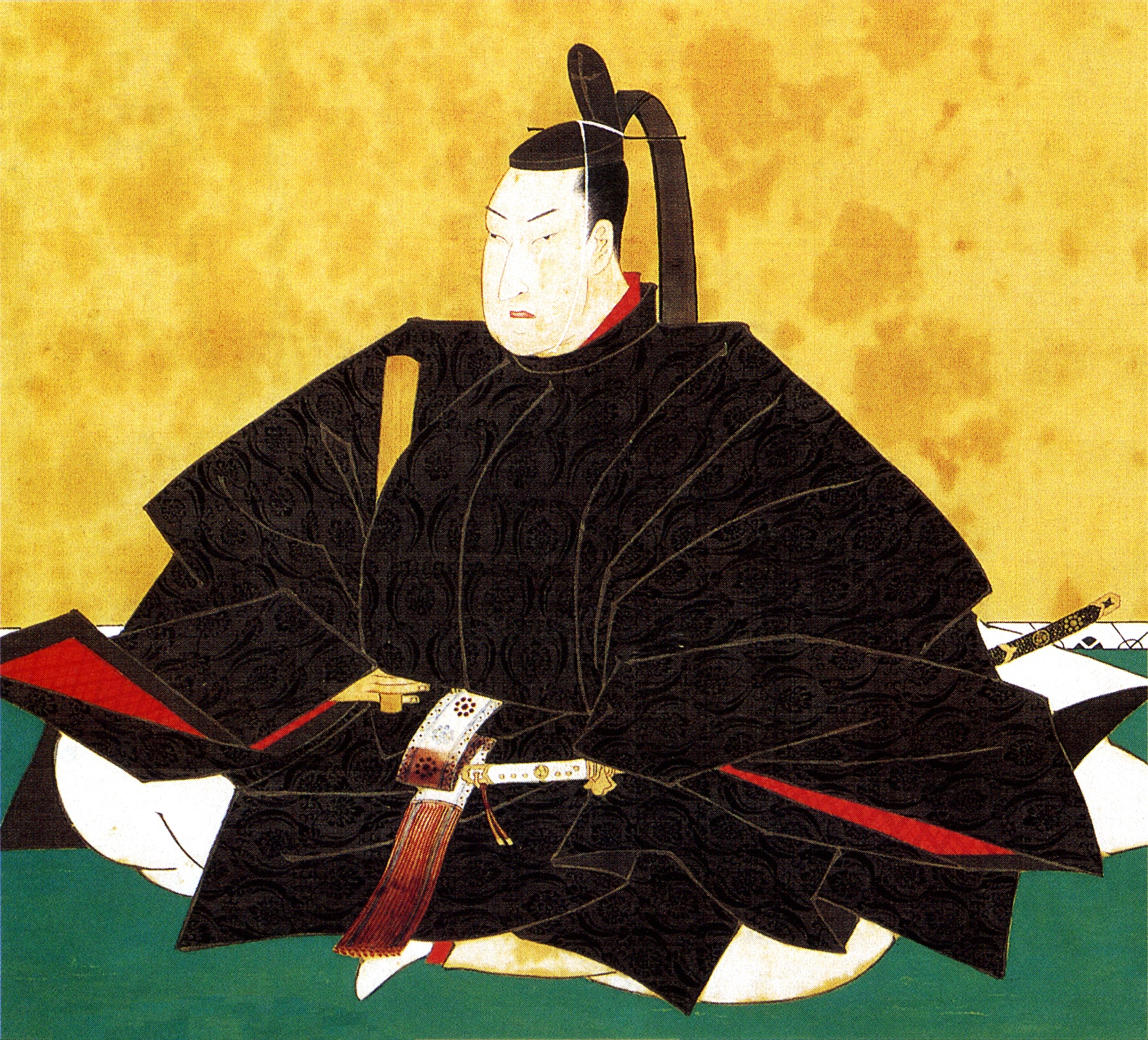
- Portrait by Tosa Mitsuoki, c. 1685

Shōgun
- In office 12 August 1680 – 19 February 1709
- Monarchs: Reigen; Higashiyama
- Preceded by: Tokugawa Ietsuna
- Succeeded by: Tokugawa Ienobu

Personal details
- Born: 23 February 1646 Edo, Tokugawa shogunate (now Tokyo, Japan)
- Died: 19 February 1709 (aged 62) Edo, Tokugawa shogunate
- Spouse: Takatsukasa Nobuko
- Children: Tsuruhime; Tokugawa Tokumatsu; Kichihime; Yaehime; Takehime
- Parent(s): Tokugawa Iemitsu; Keishouin
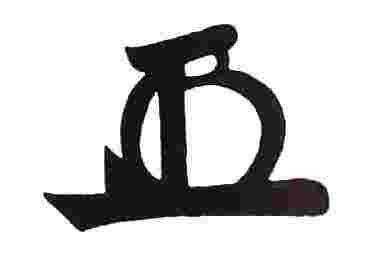
- Signature
- Nickname: The Dog Shogun

Tokugawa Tsunayoshi (徳川 綱吉; 23 February 1646 – 19 February 1709) was a Japanese samurai, daimyo and the fifth shōgun of the Tokugawa dynasty of Japan. He was the younger brother of Tokugawa Ietsuna, the son of Tokugawa Iemitsu, the grandson of Tokugawa Hidetada, and the great-grandson of Tokugawa Ieyasu.

Tsunayoshi is known for instituting animal welfare laws, particularly for dogs. This earned him the nickname of "the dog Shogun" (Inu-Kubō 犬公方: Inu=Dog, Kubō=formal title of Shogun).

== Early years (1646–1680) ==
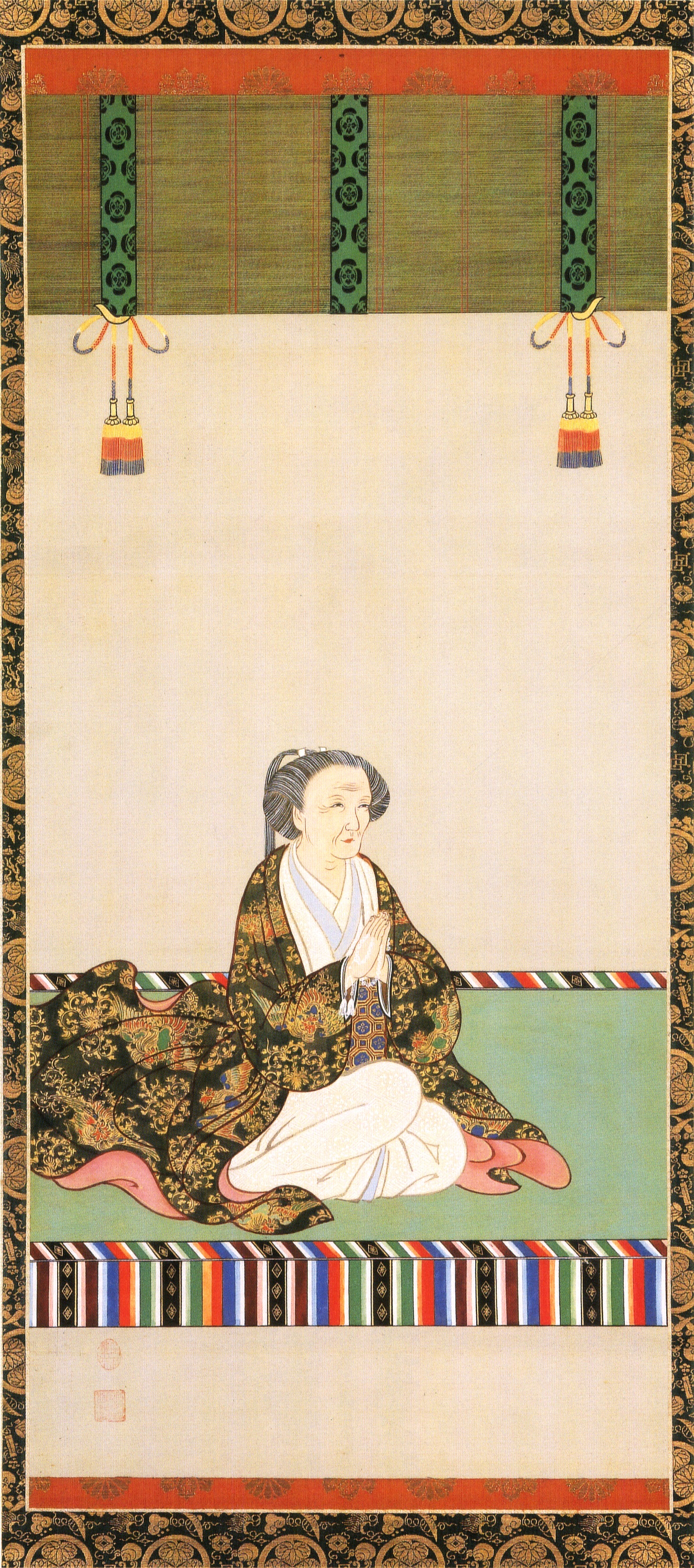
Keishōin, Tsunayoshi's mother

Tokugawa Tsunayoshi was born on 23 February 1646, in Edo. He was the son of Tokugawa Iemitsu by one of his concubines, named Otama, later known as Keishōin 桂昌院 (1627–1705). Tsunayoshi had an elder brother already five years old, who would become the next shogun after Iemitsu's death, Tokugawa Ietsuna. Tsunayoshi was born in Edo and after his birth moved in with his mother to her own private apartments in Edo Castle. "The younger son (Tsunayoshi) apparently distinguished himself by his precociousness and liveliness at an early age, and the father, the third shogun, Iemitsu, became fearful that he might usurp the position of his duller elder brothers [and] thus he ordered that the boy (Tsunayoshi) not to be brought up as a samurai/warrior, as was becoming for his station, but be trained as a scholar." His childhood name was Tokumatsu (徳松).

While his father was shōgun, his mother was an adopted daughter of the Honjō family, led by Honjō Munemasa (1580–1639) in Kyoto. His mother's natural parents were merchants in Kyoto. This remarkable woman was very close with Tsunayoshi in his young years, and while his older brother Ietsuna began to rely on regents for much of his reign, Tsunayoshi did exactly the opposite, relying on his remarkable mother for advice until her death.

In 1651, shōgun Iemitsu died when Tsunayoshi was only five years old. His older brother, Tokugawa Ietsuna, became shogun. For the most part, Tsunayoshi's life during the reign of his brother shōgun Ietsuna is unknown, but he never advised his brother.

== Family ==
- Father: Tokugawa Iemitsu (12 August 1604 – 8 June 1651)
- Mother: Otama no Kata (玉方, 1627–1705) later Keishōin, daughter of Honjo Munemasa

Consorts and their issue(s)

- Wife (Seishitsu): Takatsukasa Nobuko (鷹司信子, 1651 – 1709) later Jokoin (浄光院), daughter of court noble Takatsukasa Norihira
- Concubine (Sokushitsu): Oden no Kata (お伝の方, 1658 – 1738) later Zuishun-in (瑞春院)
  - Tsuruhime (鶴姫, 9 May 1677 – 15 May 1704), 1st daughter
    - married Tokugawa Tsunanori of Kii Domain
  - Tokugawa Tokumatsu (徳川 徳松, 14 June 1679 – 22 July 1683), 1st son
- Concubine (Sokushitsu): Lady Osuke (大典侍, d.1714), later Jukoin (寿光院）
- Concubine (Sokushitsu): Lady Shinsuke (新典侍), later Sheishin-in (清心院）

=== Adopted children ===
- Tokugawa Ienobu
- Kichihime (1697–1701) signed as Midaidokoro's daughter
- Yaehime (1689–1746) daughter of Takatsukasa Sukenobu, married Tokugawa Yoshizane of Mito Family later Yousen-in had 1 daughter, Miyohime married Tokugawa Munetaka signed as Midaidokoro's daughter
- Matsuhime daughter of Tokugawa Tsunanari married Maeda Yoshinori signed as Midaidokoro's daughter
- Takehime (1705–1772), daughter of Hirosada Seikan'in and adopted by Tokugawa Yoshimune and married Shimazu Tsugutoyo of Satsuma Domain and known as Joganin had 1 daughter, Kikuhime (1733–1808) signed as Midaidokoro's daughter and signed as Okume no Kata's daughter when she became adopted daughter of Yoshimune

== Disputed succession (1680) ==
In 1680, shōgun Ietsuna died at the premature age of 38.

- 4 June 1680 (Enpō 8, 8th day of the 5th month): Shogun Ietsuna's death leads to the accession of Tsunayoshi as head of the shogunate.
- 1680–81 (Enpō 8): Gokoku-ji in Edo is founded in honor of Tsunayoshi's mother.
- 1681 (Tenna 1): Tsunayoshi's investiture as shōgun.

A power struggle ensued, and for a time, the succession remained an open question. Sakai Tadakiyo, one of Ietsuna's most favored advisors, suggested that the succession not pass to someone of the Tokugawa line, but rather to the blood royal, favoring one of the sons of Emperor Go-Sai to become the next shōgun (as during the Kamakura shogunate) but Tadakiyo was dismissed soon after.

Hotta Masatoshi, one of the most brilliant advisors of shōgun Ietsuna's rule, was the first person to suggest that Tokugawa Tsunayoshi, as the brother of the former shōgun and the son of the third, become the next shōgun. Finally, in 1681 (Tenna 1), Tsunayoshi's elevation was confirmed; and he was installed as the fifth shōgun of the Tokugawa shogunate.

== Shōgun (1680–1709) ==
The political structure within which Tsunayoshi governed was the bakuhan system. It established a national authority in the shōgun as well as a regional authority in the daimyō; it also included an increasing amount of bureaucracy to manage both the centralization of power and decentralization of power. This was the feudal hierarchy that Tsunayoshi enforced through the strict application of the samurai code, as he interacted with the shinpan (related houses), fudai (house daimyō), and tozama (outside vassals) daimyō. Immediately after becoming shōgun, Tsunayoshi gave Hotta Masatoshi the title of Tairō, in a way thanking him for ensuring his succession. Almost immediately after he became shogun, he ordered a vassal of the Takata to commit suicide because of misgovernment, showing his strict approach to the samurai code. He then confiscated his fief of 250,000 koku. During his reign, he confiscated a total of 1,400,000 koku.

In 1682, shōgun Tsunayoshi ordered his censors and police to raise the living standard of the people. Soon, prostitution was banned, waitresses could not be employed in tea houses, and rare and expensive fabrics were banned. Most probably, smuggling began as a practice in Japan soon after Tsunayoshi's authoritarian laws came into effect. In 1684, Tsunayoshi also decreased the power of the tairō after the assassination of Masatoshi by a cousin in that same year.

Nonetheless, due again to maternal advice, Tsunayoshi became very religious, promoting the Neo-Confucianism of Zhu Xi. In 1682, he read to the daimyōs an exposition of the "Great Learning", which became an annual tradition at the shōgun's court. He soon began to lecture even more, and in 1690 lectured about Neo-Confucian work to Shinto and Buddhist daimyōs, and even to envoys from the court of Emperor Higashiyama in Kyoto. He also was interested in several Chinese works, namely The Great Learning (Da Xue) and The Classic of Filial Piety (Xiao Jing). Tsunayoshi also loved art and Noh theater.

In 1691, Engelbert Kaempfer visited Edo as part of the annual Dutch embassy from Dejima in Nagasaki. He journeyed from Nagasaki to Osaka, to Kyoto, and there to Edo. Kaempfer gives us information on Japan during the early reign of Tokugawa Tsunayoshi. As the Dutch embassy entered Edo in 1692, they asked to have an audience with Shogun Tsunayoshi. While they were waiting for approval, a fire destroyed six hundred houses in Edo, and the audience was postponed. Tsunayoshi and several of the ladies of the court sat behind reed screens, while the Dutch embassy sat in front of them. Tsunayoshi took an interest in Western matters, and apparently asked them to talk and sing with one another for him to see how Westerners behaved. Tsunayoshi later put on a Noh drama for them.

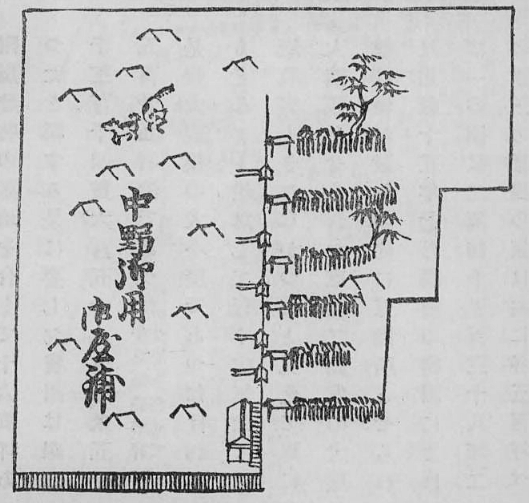
Historic drawing of the Nakano Inugoya (Nakano dog shelters) in 1696. Tokugawa Tsunayoshi had large kennels built in Nakano, Yotsuya and Okubo in Edo (Tokyo). Even during the famine the Shogunate accommodated 80,000 stray dogs in the kennels in Nakano and gave them 3 go (0.18L) of polished rice, 50 moon (187g) of bean paste and 1 go of sardines daily. The total space for the dog shelters in Nakano was approximately 750,000 square meters in 1702.

A devout Buddhist, he sought protection for living beings in the later parts of his rule. In the 1690s and first decade of the 1700s, Tsunayoshi, who was born in the Year of the Dog, thought he should take several measures concerning dogs. A collection of edicts released daily, known as the Edicts on Compassion for Living Things (生類憐みの令, Shōruiawareminorei), told the populace, among other things, to protect dogs, since in Edo there were many stray and diseased dogs walking around the city. Therefore, he earned the pejorative title Inu-Kubō (犬公方: Inu=Dog, Kubō=formal title of Shogun).

In 1695, there were so many dogs that Edo began to smell horribly. An apprentice was even executed because he wounded a dog. Finally, the issue was taken to an extreme, as over 50,000 dogs were deported to kennels in the suburbs of the city where they would be housed. They were apparently fed rice and fish at the expense of the taxpaying citizens of Edo.

For the latter part of Tsunayoshi's reign, he was advised by Yanagisawa Yoshiyasu. Yanagisawa Yoshiyasu (柳沢吉保), (1658-1714) was one of the most influential figures in Tsunayoshi's administration. He was an officer in the government of the Tokugawa Shoguns and a favorite of the fifth shōgun, Tokugawa Tsunayoshi. Yoshiyasu began working with Tsunayoshi at a very young age; eventually, he would rise to the rank of soba yōnin which is a high-ranking title signifying him as Tsunayoshi's private servant and gatekeeper. Additionally, beyond politics, he was a patron of art: he established Rikugien Garden, a traditional Japanese garden, in 1695. The Genroku period, which spanned from 1688 to 1704, was largely concurrent with the majority of Tsunayoshi's reign and was an age that has come to be recognized historically as a celebrated era of artistic achievement in Japanese history. There was a sense of peace and economic stability that existed throughout this time because the preceding century-long period of both peace and isolation that Japan experienced produced a relatively stable economy; as a result, the arts and architectural achievements flourished notably. However, while certainly influenced by the Shogun's patronage of the arts, this cultural renaissance truly represented a larger shift within Japanese society. During the Edo Period, a culture of the common people developed in the urban areas of Japan, including Edo and other major cities such as Osaka and Kyoto. Artistic forms such as kabuki and ukiyo-e (woodblock printing) flourished during this time. Some of the many famous figures who were active during the Genroku era include: playwright Chikamatsu Monzaemon, kabuki actors, including Ichikawa Danjūrō I, artists who created woodblock prints (ukiyo-e), including Hishikawa Moronobu, and haiku poet Matsuo Bashō. However, despite the cultural advancements that took place during this time, some significant financial problems developed, most notably, the shogunate's devaluation of currency to continue the appearance of prosperity during this period, which caused an immediate, severe increase in prices.

In 1701, Asano Naganori, the daimyō of Akō han, having been allegedly insulted by Kira Yoshinaka in Edo Castle, attempted to kill him. Asano was executed, but Kira went unpunished. Asano's forty-seven rōnin avenged his death by killing Kira and became a legend that influenced many plays and stories of the era. The most successful of them was a bunraku play called Kanadehon Chūshingura (now simply called Chūshingura, or "Treasury of Loyal Retainers"), written in 1748 by Takeda Izumo and two associates; it was later adapted into a kabuki play, which is still one of Japan's most popular. The earliest known account of the Akō incident in the West was published in 1822 in Isaac Titsingh's book, Illustrations of Japan.

Tsunayoshi's first son Tokugawa Tokumatsu (1679–1683) died at the age of 4 due to illness.

In 1704, Tsunayoshi's only surviving child, Tsuruhime died following a miscarriage and a few months after her husband, his son-in-law, Tokugawa Tsunanori of Kii Domain also died. Therefore, Tsunayoshi appointed his nephew, Tokugawa Ienobu, heir apparent in the winter of 1704. Ienobu was the son of his other brother, Tokugawa Tsunashige, the former Lord of Kōfu, which was a title Ienobu held himself before becoming shōgun. Ienobu moved into the official residence of Shogunal heir apparent at the Western Perimeter of Edo Castle.

In 1706, Edo was hit by a typhoon, and Mount Fuji erupted the following year.

It was insinuated that Tsunayoshi was stabbed by his consort after he tried to proclaim an illegitimate child as his heir; this concept, stemming from the Sanno Gaiki, is refuted in contemporary records which explain that Tsunayoshi had the measles at the end of his life and died on 19 February 1709, in the presence of his entourage. His death was just four days short of his 63rd birthday. He was given the Buddhist name Joken'in (常憲院) and buried in Kan'ei-ji.

== Legacy ==
Although derided during his time and afterwards for what was perceived as his overtly strong care of dogs, more recent evaluations by historians have shown him to be ahead of his time with his progressive animal welfare laws. His edicts on the care of animals can be seen as equivalent to modern-day animal rights and welfare laws and regulations. His reign marked the first time in comprehensive and enforced animal welfare and rights in Japan since the rule of Emperor Tenmu (673–686).

== Eras of Tsunayoshi's bakufu ==
The years in which Tsunayoshi was shogun are more specifically identified by more than one era name or nengō.

- Enpō (1673–1681)
- Tenna (1681–1684)
- Jōkyō (1684–1688)
- Genroku (1688–1704)
- Hōei (1704–1711)

== Ancestry ==
Ancestors of Tokugawa Tsunayoshi

8. Tokugawa Ieyasu, 1st Tokugawa Shōgun (1543-1616)
4. Tokugawa Hidetada, 2nd Tokugawa Shōgun (1579-1632)
9. Lady Saigō (1552-1589)
2. Tokugawa Iemitsu, 3rd Tokugawa Shōgun (1604-1651)
10. Azai Nagamasa (1545-1573)
5. Oeyo (1573-1626)
11. Oichi (1547-1583)
1. Tokugawa Tsunayoshi, 5th Tokugawa Shōgun
6. Honjō Munemasa (?) (1580-1639)
3. Keishōin (1627-1705)
7. Nabeta

== Notes ==
Royal titles
Preceded by Matsudaira Norihisa	Lord of Tatebayashi: Tokugawa Tsunayoshi; 1661–1680	Succeeded by Tokugawa Tokumatsu
Military offices
Preceded by Tokugawa Ietsuna	Shōgun: Tokugawa Tsunayoshi; 1680–1709	Succeeded by Tokugawa Ienobu
