= Tenna =

Period of Japanese history (1681–1684)

Tenna (天和) was a Japanese era name (年号, nengō; "year name") after Enpō and before Jōkyō. This period spanned the years from September 1681 through February 1684. The reigning emperor was Reigen-tennō (霊元天皇).

== Change of era ==
- Tenna gannen (天和元年): The new era name of Tenna (meaning "Heavenly Imperial Peace") was created to mark the 58th year of a cycle of the Chinese zodiac. The previous era ended and the new one commenced in Enpō 9, on the 29th day of the 9th month.

== Events of the Tenna era ==
- 1681 (Tenna 1): In Edo, the investiture of Tokugawa Tsunayoshi as the fifth shōgun of the Edo bakufu.
- February 5, 1681 (Tenna 1, 28th day of the 12th month): The Great Tenna Fire in Edo.
- 1681 (Tenna 2): A famine afflicts Heian-kyō and the nearby areas.
- March 3, 1683 (Tenna 3, 5th day of the 2nd month): Yaoya Oshichi was burned at the stake for arson.
- 1683 (Tenna 3): Tokugawa shogunate grants permission for Mitsui money exchanges (ryōgaeten) to be established in Edo.
- 1683 (Tenna 4): The assassination of Hotta Masatoshi signals the end of government characterized by financial sobriety and stringency, and the beginning of a swing towards extravagance and the expansive spending policies of Tsunayoshi's chamberlains.

== Notes ==
Preceded by Enpō (延宝)	Era or nengō Tenna (天和); 1681–1684	Succeeded by Jōkyō (貞享)
