= Enpō =

Period of Japanese history (1673–1681)

Enpō (延宝) (contemporarily written as 延寳) is the Japanese era name (年号, nengō, "year name") after Kanbun and before Tenna. This period spanned the years from September 1673 to September 1681. The reigning emperor was Reigen-tennō (霊元天皇).

== Change of era ==
- 1673 Enpō gannen (延宝元年): The new era of Enpō (meaning "Prolonged Wealth") was created to mark a number of disasters, including a great fire in Kyōto. The previous era ended and a new one commenced in Kanbun 14, on the ninth day of the 13th month.

== Events of the Enpō era ==
- 1673 (Enpō 1): There was a great fire in Heian-kyō.
- 1673 (Enpō 1): The foundations for Mitsui financial success began with the opening of a dry good store in Edo.
- May 10, 1674 (Enpō 2, 5th day of the 4th month): Ingen Ryūki, founder of the Ōbaku sect of Japanese Zen Buddhism, died at Manpuku-ji, a Buddhist temple which Ingen had founded at Uji, near Heian-kyō.
- 1675 (Enpō 3): A devastating fire burned Heian-kyō.
- 1675 (Enpō 3): The Bonin Islands (Ogasawara Islands) are explored by shogunate expedition, following up "discovery" of the islands by the Japanese when a ship bound for Edo from Kyūshū is blown off course by a storm in Kanbun 10. The islands are claimed as a territory of Japan.
- April 7, 1680 (Enpō 8, 8th day of the 3rd month) : Tokugawa Ietsuna, the 4th shōgun of the Edo bakufu died; and his named successor, Tokugawa Tsunayoshi, was ready to take his place as the 5th Tokugawa shōgun.

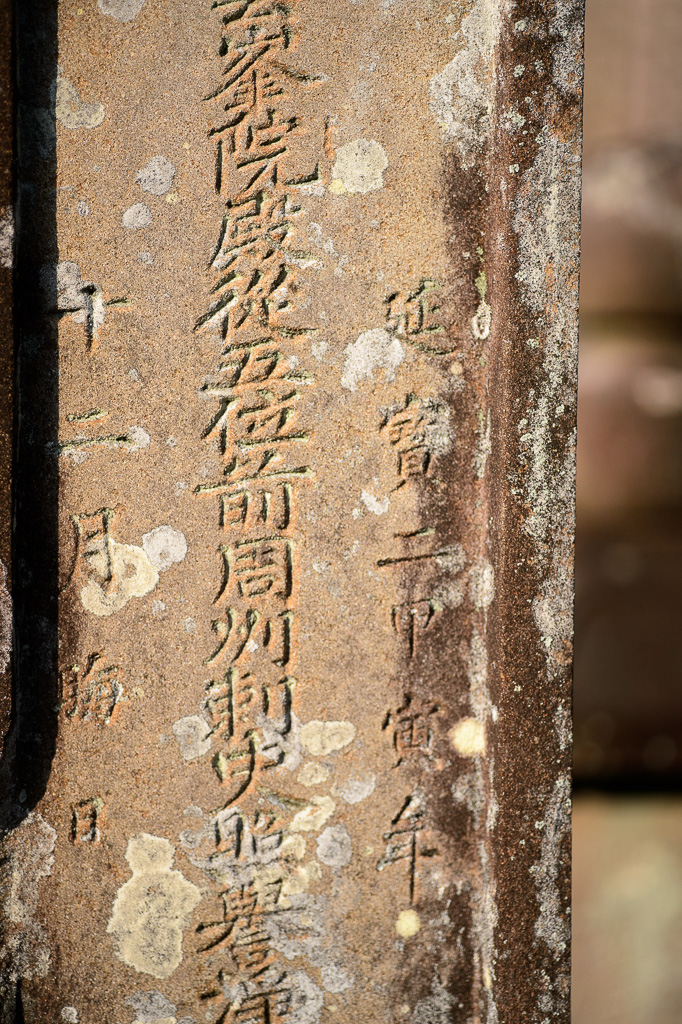
Gravestone showing "延寳二甲寅年" (Enpō 2, 1674)

== Notes ==
Preceded by Kanbun (寛文)	Era or nengō Enpō (延宝); 1673–1681	Succeeded by Tenna (天和)
