= Tsuki no wa no misasagi =

Mausoleum in Higashiyama, Kyoto, Japan

- 月輪陵
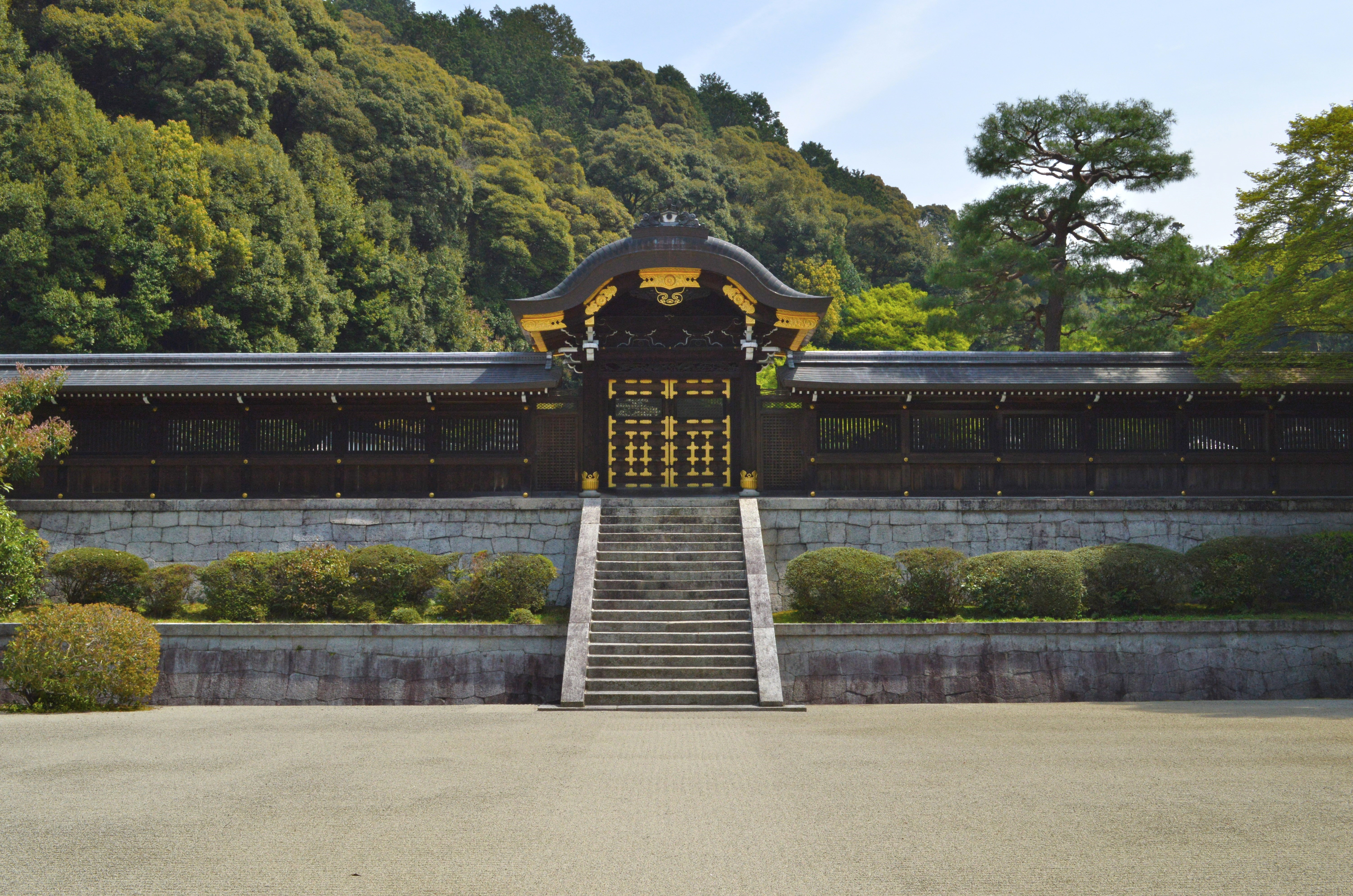
- Tsuki no wa no misasagi
- Interactive map of Tsuki no wa no misasagi

Details
- Established: 1242
- Location: Higashiyama-ku, Kyoto
- Country: Japan
- Type: imperial cemetery
- Owned by: Imperial Household Agency
- Footnotes: Imperial tomb

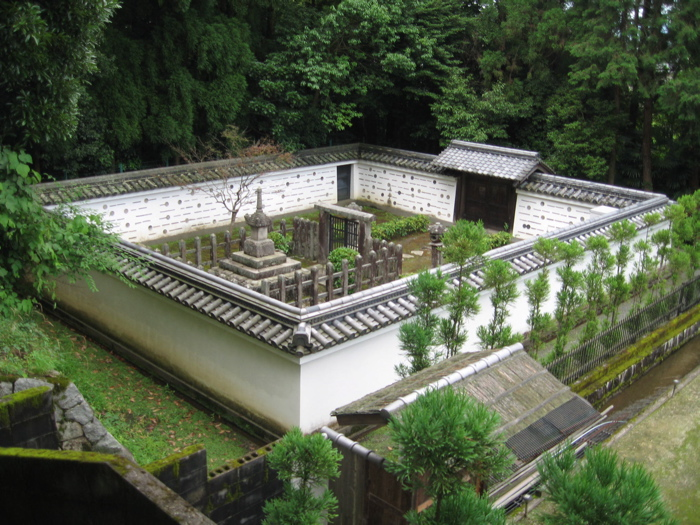
Grave of Emperor Go-Mizunoo

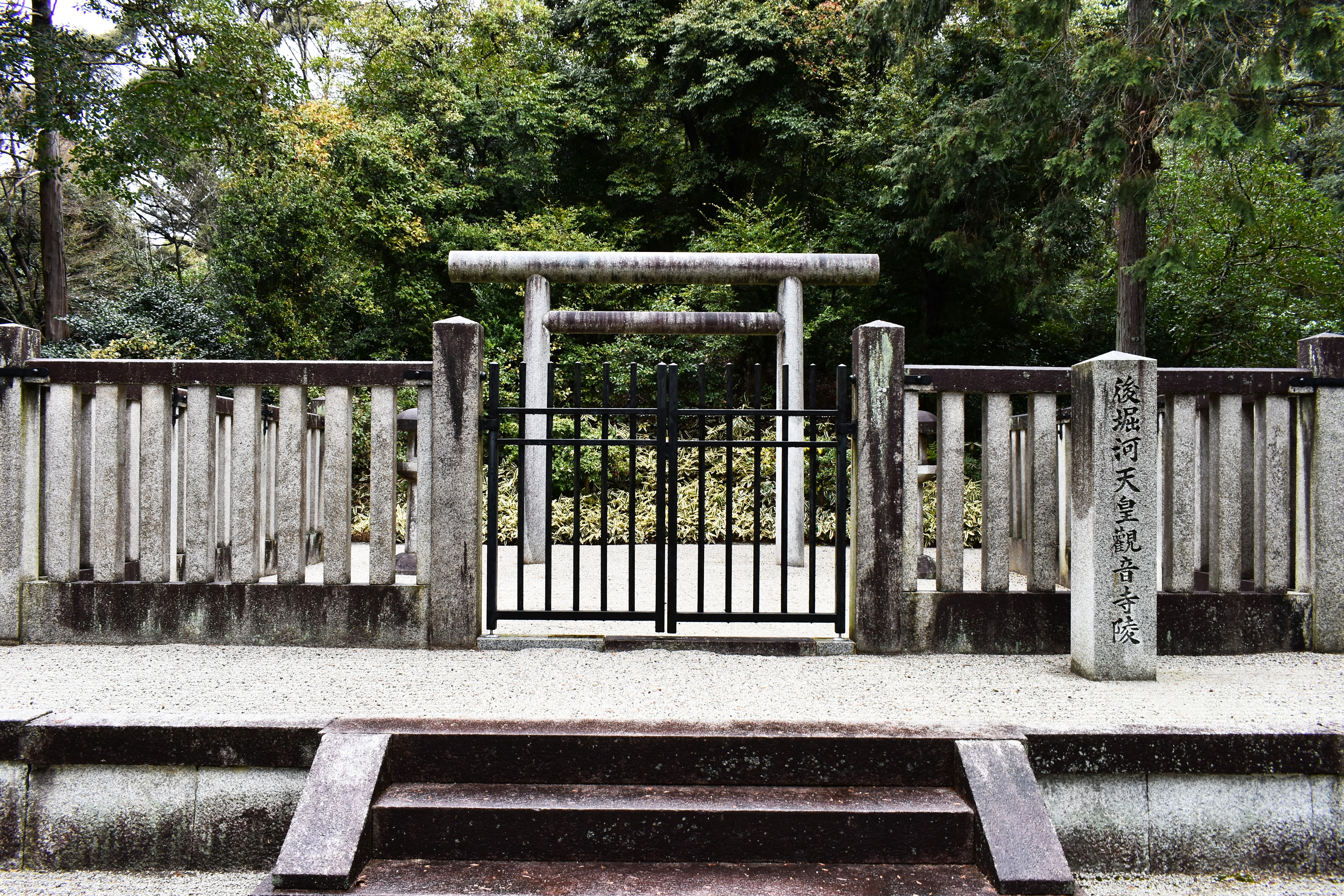
Grave of Emperor Go-Horikawa

Tsuki no wa no misasagi (月輪陵) and the Nochi no Tsuki no wa no misasagi (後月輪陵) is the name of a mausoleum in Higashiyama-ku, Kyoto used by successive generations of the Japanese Imperial Family. The mausoleum complex is historically associated with Sennyū-ji, a Buddhist temple founded in the early Heian period, which was the bodaiji (菩提寺) of the Imperial Family.. The complex contains 25 mausoleums, including those of 14 emperors, starting with Emperor Shijō, as well as the ash mounds of five emperors and the tombs of nine other members of the imperial family.

Due to the separation of Shinto and Buddhism during the Meiji era, it was surrendered to the Imperial Household Ministry. The Main Mausoleum is located behind the Reimei-den Hall of Sennyū-ji, surrounded by a lattice wall and a gate with a curved gable, with a white sand garden in front serving as a place of worship. The name is derived from Tsukinowa Daishi of Sennyū-ji and Mount Tsukinowa behind the temple. Nearby are the Kannonji Mausoleum of Emperor Go-Horikawa, the Go-Tsukinowa Higashiyama Mausoleum of Emperor Kōmei, and the Go-Tsukinowa Tohoku Mausoleum of Empress Dowager Eishō, all of which are considered part of the overall complex.

== History ==
During the early Heian period, it was customary for emperors who died while still on the throne to be buried, while those who died after abdicating were cremated. On the other hand, it was recognized that it was an inauspicious event for an emperor to die while still on the throne, so abdication during one's lifetime became customary, and from the mid-9th century onwards, cremation became the norm. Cremation mounds and ash mounds, separate from the mausoleums, were constructed at the places where the cremation took place. Also, throughout the Heian period, the connection between imperial mausoleums and temples grew stronger.

When the imperial court was defeated in the Jōkyū War (1221), its authority declined, and the Kamakura shogunate's will began to influence the succession to the throne. When Emperor Shijō suddenly died in 1242, his funeral was held at Sennyū-ji, and he was buried within the temple grounds. A new hall was constructed as his tomb. This was the first instance of an imperial funeral at Sennyū-ji and the establishment of the Tsukinowa Mausoleum. There is a tradition that the reason the funeral and burial took place at Sennyū-ji was according to Emperor Shijō's will, but it is thought that no temple would undertake Emperor Shijō's funeral out of fear of the shogunate; and Sennyū-ji did so as Kujō Michiie who was both Emperor Shijō's grandfather and the grandfather of Emperor Shijō's consort, was the patron of the temple, and because it was close to the tomb of his father, Emperor Go-Horikawa.

Afterward, the imperial line split into the Jimyōin line and the Daikaku-ji line, eventually leading to the Nanboku-chō period When Fukakusa Hokkedō (present-day Fukakusa Kita Mausoleum) was built as the tomb of Emperor Go-Fukakusa (died 1304), the first emperor of the Jimyōin lineage, and subsequent emperors of the Jimyōin lineage were buried there.

Emperor Go-Kōgon (died 1374), the fourth emperor of the Northern Court, had his funeral and cremation at Sennyū-ji and his ashes interred at Fukakusa Hokkedō. Furthermore, his ashes were divided and distributed among five temples, including Sennyū-ji. From then on, Sennyū-ji monopolized the funeral and cremation of emperors, and it became customary for the ashes to be interred at Fukakusa Hokkedō afterward. Among them, the ash mounds of five emperors, from Emperor Go-Tsuchimikado (died 1500) to Emperor Go-Yōzei (died 1617), were constructed within the main mausoleum.

In the Edo period, tombs of members of the imperial family, starting with Shin-Jōtōmon-in (died 1620), were constructed within the main mausoleum, and with Emperor Go-Kōmyō (died 1654), the first mausoleum since Emperor Shijō was constructed. [14] From Emperor Go-Kōmyō to Emperor Ninkō (died 1846), the funeral system for emperors in the early modern period involved performing a cremation ceremony but not actually cremating the deceased, instead burying them in the ground. Furthermore, all mausoleums were constructed within the main mausoleum, and Sennyū-ji became, in name and in reality, the imperial family's bodaiji.

When Emperor Kōmei died in 1867, a movement arose to revive imperial tombs due to the separation of Shinto and Buddhism. There were suggestions to construct the tomb near Emperor Tenji's tomb, but Sennyū-ji opposed this, and it was decided to build it at the Gotsukinowa Higashiyama Mausoleum. This confusion caused Emperor Kōmei's funeral to take place a month after his death. The funeral was a complete earth burial without cremation, marking a restoration to pre-Buddhist practices.

== Tsuki no wa no misasagi ==
Of the five ash mounds, four, excluding the ash mound of Emperor Go-Yōzei, are planted with trees and arranged side by side. The trees planted are now sakaki trees, sacred to Shintoism. However, different trees were planted in the past. Only the ash mound of Emperor Go-Yōzei is a nine-story stone pagoda. However, the distinction between mausoleums and ash mounds was not clear at the time, as records from the Muromachi period refer to ash mounds also as "imperial mausoleum" and "imperial tomb".

All of the currently designated imperial mausoleums are nine-story stone pagodas, and the sections are divided into squares by stone dividers and finished with stone paving. Some have stone gates attached to the stone dividers. The tombs of the 16 empresses and form princes are primarily of the form of a Muhōtō or a Hōkyōintō stupa. The scale of the tombs of the empresses differs depending on whether they are the principal wife or not. Initially, the form was a Muhōtō stupa, but the tomb of Tōfukumon'in was the first to be a Hōkyōintō. Records show that the shogunate consulted the imperial court regarding the construction of Tōfukumon'in's tomb. After Tōfukumon'in's tomb, the form reverted to a Muhōtō stupa, but more than 100 years later, a Hōkyōintō was again constructed at Seikamon'in's tomb. From then on, the tombs of empresses became Hōkyōintō. However, these tombs lack the stone inscription found at the Tofukumonin's tomb, and their status is lower.

Only the Shinseiwain tomb is a seven-story pagoda, but this was rebuilt in 1870, but was originally a Hōkyōintō pagoda. According to records, when built the Imperial Court requested permission from the Shogunate to make its scale the same as that of the Tofukumonin, due to her status as an Imperial princess.

In the 19th century, three princely tombs were constructed, all of which were children of the Emperor's principal wife, suggesting that the status of their birth mothers played a role. All of these are Hōkyōintō pagodas, but are slightly smaller than those of the Empress Dowager.

No.	Name of the tomb	Deceased	Form	Size (cm) Total height × Tower height × Base width	Section (cm square) Finish, etc.	Funeral Date	Remarks
1	Emperor Shijō Tsukinowa Mausoleum	87th Emperor; Emperor Shijō	Nine-Storied Pagoda	454×-×-	224; Paving Stones and Stone Inscription	Ninji 3 (1242); January 25	
2	Emperor Go-Tsuchimikado's Ash Mound	103rd Emperor; Emperor Go-Tsuchimikado	Trees	—	—	Meio 9 (1500); November 11	According to records from the Kyōroku era, the trees were camellias. This tomb is Fukakusa Kita Mausoleum
3	Emperor Go-Kashiwabara's Ash Mound	104th Emperor; Emperor Go-Kashiwabara	Trees	—	—	Daiei 6 (1526); May 3	According to records from the Kyōroku era, the trees were pines. This mausoleum is Fukakusa Kita Mausoleum
4	Emperor Go-Nara's Ash Mound	105th Emperor; Emperor Go-Nara	Trees	—	—	Koji 3 (1557); November 22	This mausoleum is Fukakusa Kita Mausoleum
5	Posthumously Honored Emperor Yōkō Taijō Emperor (Prince Masahito) Tsukinowa Mausoleum	Prince Masahito	Muhōtō	172×155×78	224; Stone Inscription	Tensho 14 (1586); August 10	Emperor Go-Yōzei's Birth Father
6	Emperor Ōgimachi's Ash Mound	106th Emperor; Emperor Ōgimachi	Trees	—	—	Bunroku 2 (1593); February 23	This mausoleum is Fukakusa Kita Mausoleum
7	Emperor Go-Yōzei's Ash Mound	107th Emperor; Emperor Go-Yōzei	Nine-Storied Pagoda	550×545×295	452; Stone Inscription	Genna 3 (1617); September 20	This mausoleum is Fukakusa Kita Mausoleum
8	Haruko (Shinjō Tomonin) Grave	Kanjuji Haruko	Muhōtō	171×161×81	197	Genna 6 (1620); March 12	Emperor Goyōzei's birth mother
9	Chuwamonin Fujiwara Sakiko Tomb	Konoe Sakiko	Muhōtō	166×157×79	196	Kanei 7 (1630); July 28	Lawful wife of Emperor Gōyōzei and birth mother of Emperor Gomizunoo
10	Emperor Gokōmyō Tsukirin Mausoleum	110th Emperor Go-Kōmyō	Nine-storied pagoda	607×569×296	631; Paving stones, stone scrolls, stone gates	Joo 3 (1654); October 15	
11	Mibuin Fujiwara Mitsuko Grave	Sono Mitsuko	Muhōtō	210×180×91	196	Meireki 2 (1656); February 23	Emperor Gokōmyō's birth mother
12	Shinkogimonin Fujiwara Kuniko Tomb	Sono Kuniko	Muhōtō	?×169×?	187	Enpō 5 (1677); July 16	Mother of Emperor Reigen
13	Empress Kazuko (Tofukumonin) Tsukinowa Mausoleum	Tokugawa Kazuko	Hōkyōintō	368×356×213	448; Stone Inscription	Enpō 6 (1678); June 26	Principal Wife of Emperor Go-Mizunoo, Mother of Empress Meishō
14	Emperor Go-Mizunoo's Tsukinowa Mausoleum	108th Emperor; Emperor Go-Mizunoo	Nine-Storied Pagoda	579×544×273	494; Paving Stones and Stone Inscriptions	Enpō 8 (1680); Leap August 8	
15	Emperor Go-Sai's Tsukinowa Mausoleum	111th Emperor; Emperor Go-Sai	Nine-Storied Pagoda	539×510×213	368; Paving Stones and Stone Inscriptions	Jokyo 2 (1685); March 7	
16	Tomb of Fujiwara no Takako, Oshunmon-in	Kushige Takako	Muhōtō	186×164×89	182	2 June, 1685	Mother of Emperor Gosai
17	Tsukinowa Mausoleum of Empress Meishō	109th Emperor Empress Meishō	Nine-Storied Pagoda	541×507×212	365 Paving Stones and Stone Inscription	25 November, 1696	
18	Emperor Higashiyama Tsukirin Mausoleum	113th Emperor Higashiyama	Nine-storied pagoda	578×556×273	499; Paving stones/stone book	Hoei 6 (1709); Next January 10	
19	Empress Fusako (Shinjōsimon-in) Tsukirin Mausoleum	Takatsuka Fusako	Muhōtō	210×183×91	212	Shōtoku 2 (1712); May 12	Lawful wife of Emperor Reigen
20	Empress Dowager Naoko (Shin-Chūwamon-in) Tsukinowa Mausoleum	Konoe Naoko	Muhōtō	212×185×90	212	Kyōhō 5 (1720); February 6	Principal wife of Emperor Nakamikado, mother of Emperor Sakuramachi
21	Empress Yukiko (Shōshūmon-in) Tsukinowa Mausoleum	Princess Yukiko	Muhōtō	209×186×90	212	Kyōhō 5 (1720); March 5	Principal wife of Emperor Higashiyama
22	Emperor Reigen's Tsukinowa Mausoleum	112th Emperor; Emperor Reigen	Nine-Storied Pagoda	563×538×272	662; Paving Stones and Stone Inscriptions	Kyōhō 17 (1732); August 29	
23	Emperor Nakamikado's Tsukinowa Mausoleum	114th Emperor; Emperor Nakamikado	Nine-Storied Pagoda	591×560×274	661; Paving Stones and Stone Inscriptions	Genbun 2 (1737); May 8	
24	Emperor Sakuramachi Tsukinowa Mausoleum	115th Emperor; Emperor Sakuramachi	Nine-Storied Pagoda	567×539×274	666; Paving Stones and Stone Plaques	Kan'en 3 (1750); May 18	
25	Emperor Momozono Tsukinowa Mausoleum	116th Emperor; Emperor Momozono	Nine-Storied Pagoda	609×574×400	742; Paving Stones, Stone Plaques, and Stone Gate	Hōreki 12 (1762); August 22	
26	Emperor Go-Momozono's Tsukinowa Mausoleum	118th Emperor; Emperor Go-Momozono	Nine-Storied Pagoda	635×608×401	728; Paving Stones, Stone Plaque, Stone Gate	An'ei 8 (1779); December 10	
27	Empress Dowager Koreko (Seikamon-in) Tsukinowa Mausoleum	Konoe Koreko	Hōkyōintō	?×363×214	399	Tenmei 3 (1783); November 13	Emperor Go-Momozono's Principal Wife
28	Honored title Empress Dowager Ieko (Seikimon-in) Tsukinowa Mausoleum	Nijō Ieko	Hōkyōintō	389×368×214	395	Kansei 2 (1790); February 22	Principal wife of Emperor Sakuramachi, mother of Emperor Go-Sakuramachi
29	Honored title Empress Dowager Tomiko (Kyōreimon-in) Tsukinowa Mausoleum	Ichijō Tomiko	Hōkyōintō	416×384×214	400	Kansei 7 (1795); December 29	Lawful wife of Emperor Momozono and mother of Emperor Gomomozono
30	Imperial Prince Atsuhito Tomb	Prince Atsuhito	Hōkyōintō	333×327×?	312	Kansei 12 (1800); April 22	Son of Emperor Kōkaku, mother of Shinseiwain
31	Tsukinowa Mausoleum of Emperor Go-Sakuramachi	117th Emperor; Emperor Go-Sakuramachi	Nine-Storied Pagoda	563×548×274	647; Paving Stones and Stone Plaque	Bunka 10 (1813); December 16	
32	Tomb of Prince Toshihito	Prince Toshihito	Hōkyōintō	303×272×?	300	Bunsei 4 (1821); February 27	Emperor Kokaku's birth mother is Shinseiwain
33	Imperial Prince Yasuhito Tomb	Prince Yasuhito	Hōkyōintō	333×303×?	312	Bunsei 4 (1821); June 21	Son of Emperor Ninko, mother of Shin-Kōkamon-in
34	Posthumously granted Empress Tsunako (Shin-Kōkamon-in) Go-Tsukinowa Mausoleum	Takatsukasa Tsunako	Hōkyōintō	380×368×200	348	Bunsei 6 (1823); May 2	Principal wife of Emperor Ninko
35	Go-Tsukinowa Mausoleum of Emperor Kōkaku	119th Emperor; Emperor Kōkaku	Nine-Storied Pagoda	605×582×274	665; Paving stones and stone plaque	Tenpo 11 (1840); December 20	
36	Emperor Ninkō's Gotsukinowa Mausoleum	120th Emperor; Emperor Ninkō	Nine-story pagoda	671×648×402	743; Paving stones, stone plaque, and stone gate	Koka 3 (1846); March 4	
37	Empress Yoshiko (Shinseiwain) Go-Tsukinowa Mausoleum	Empress Yoshiko	Seven-Storied Pagoda	496×478×216	449; Stone Inscription	Koka 3 (1846); July 23	Daughter of Emperor Go-Momozono, Principal Wife of Emperor Kōkaku
38	Honorary Title Empress Dowager Yasuko (Shin-Sakuheimonin) Go-Tsukinowa Mausoleum	Takatsukasa Yasuko	Hōkyōintō	398×378×216	402	Kōka 4 (1847); November 12	Emperor Ninkō's principal wife (second wife)
39	Tomb of Shin-Taikenmon-in Fujiwara Masako	Ogimachi Masako	Muhōtō	?×175×?	187	Ansei 3 (1856); July 23	Emperor Kōmei's birth mother
