= Shōhō =

Period of Japanese history (1644–1648)

Shōhō (正保) was a Japanese era name (年号, nengō; "year name") after Kan'ei and before Keian. This period spanned the years from December 1644 through February 1648. The reigning emperor was Go-Kōmyō-tennō (後光明天皇).

== Change of era ==
- 1644 Shōhō gannen (正保元年): The era name was changed to Shōhō to mark the enthronement of the new emperor Go-Kōmyō. The previous era ended and a new one commenced in Kan'ei 21, on the 16th day of the 12th month.

== Events of the Shōhō era ==
- 1644 (Shōhō 1): The third major map of Japan was ordered by the Tokugawa Shogunate—the first having been completed in Keichō 10—at a scale of 1:432,000 (based on maps of the provinces drawn to a scale of 1:21,600).
- May 18, 1645 (Shōhō 2, 23rd day of the 4th month): The Shōgun was elevated the court role of Middle Counselor (中納言, Chūnaigon).
- June 13, 1645 (Shōhō 2, 19th day of the 5th month): Death of Miyamoto Musashi.
- December 1645 (Shōhō 3): Death of Takuan Sōhō, a leading figure in the Zen reform movement.
- January 18, 1646 (Shōhō 2, 2nd day of the 12th month): Death of Hosokawa Tadaoki.
- May 11, 1646 (Shōhō 3, 26th day of the 3rd month): Death of Yagyū Munenori.
- 1648 (Shōhō 6): The shogunate issues a legal code governing the lives of commoners in Edo.

== Notes ==
Preceded by Kan'ei (寛永)	Era or nengō Shōhō (正保); 1644–1648	Succeeded by Keian (慶安)
