= Princess Yukiko =

- Empress consort of Japan

Empress consort of Japan
- Reign: 27 March 1708 – 7 November 1709
- Predecessor: Fujiwara no Fusako
- Successor: Princess Yoshiko
- Born: 14 November 1680; Kyoto, Japan
- Died: March 18, 1720 (aged 39); Kyoto, Japan
- Burial: Tsuki no wa no misasagi, Kyoto
- Spouse: Emperor Higashiyama
- Issue: Imperial Princess Akiko
- House: Arisugawa-no-miya
- Father: Arisugawa-no-miya Yukihito
- Religion: Buddhism

Princess Yukiko (幸子女王; 14 November 1680 – 18 March 1720) later known as Shōshūmon’in(承秋門院), was an empress consort of Emperor Higashiyama of Japan. She was one of only four Empresses during the Edo Period.

She was the daughter of Arisugawa-no-miya Yukihito. She was thus a member of the Arisugawa-no-miya, one of the Imperial family clans. She became a part of the Emperor's court in 1697. She gave birth to a Princess in 1700. In 1707, she was promoted to a higher rank. In 1708, she was named Empress. This was one of only four times during the Edo Period for this to occur.

Issue

- First daughter: Imperial Princess Akiko (1700–1756)

== Notes ==
Japanese royalty
Preceded by Fujiwara no Fusako	Empress consort of Japan; 1708–1710	Succeeded by Princess Yoshiko
