= Jōkyō =

Period of Japanese history (1684–1688)

Jōkyō (貞享) was a Japanese era name (年号, nengō; "year name") after Tenna and before Genroku. This period spanned the years from February 1684 through September 1688. The reigning emperors were Reigen-tennō (霊元天皇) and Higashiyama-tennō (東山天皇).

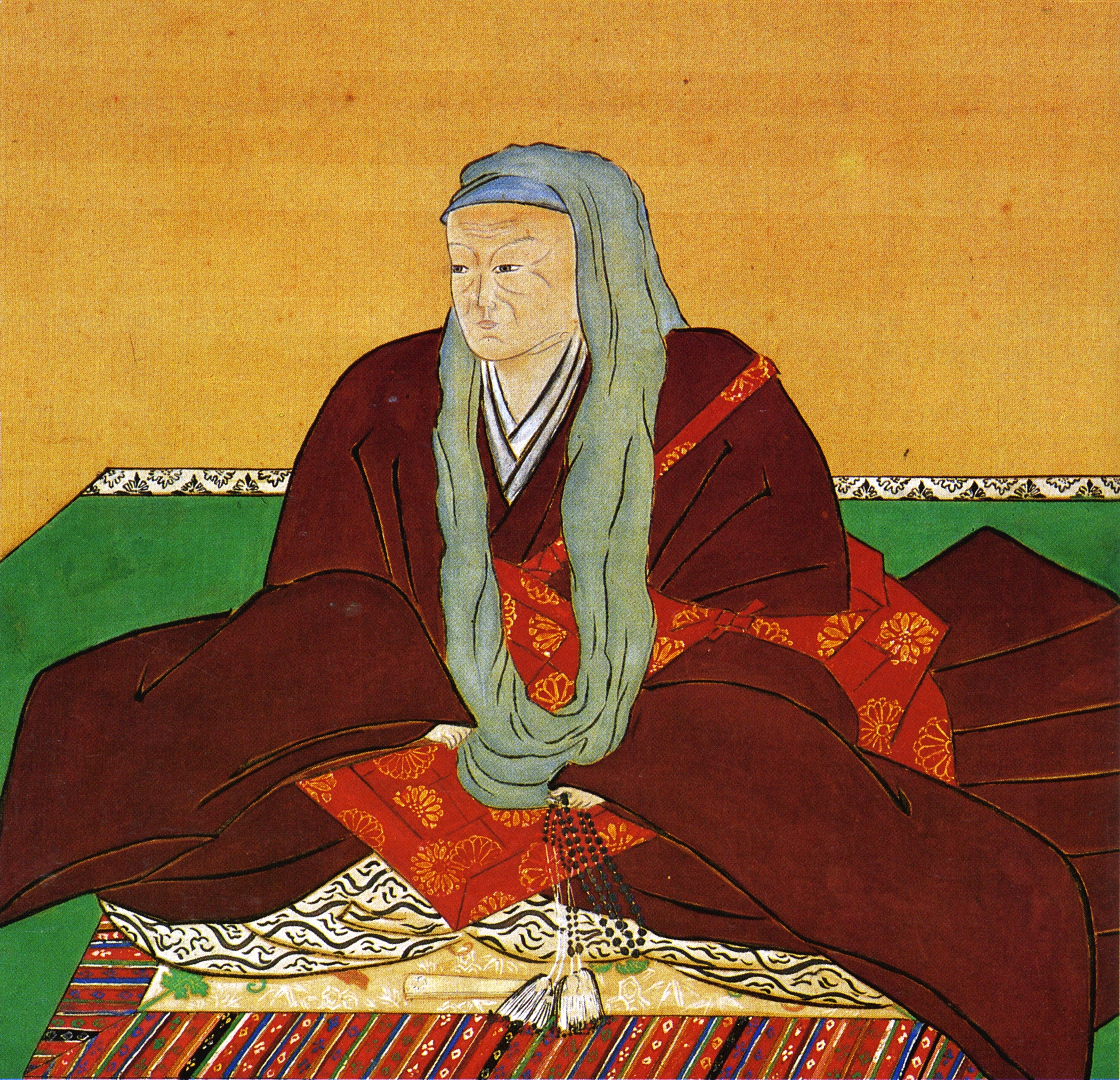
Emperor Reigen

== Change of era ==
- 1684 Jōkyō gannen (貞享元年): The new era of Jōkyō (meaning "Taking Righteousness") was created to mark the start of a new cycle of the Chinese zodiac. The previous era ended and the new one commenced in Tenna 4, on the 21st day of the 2nd month.

Subsequently, the power to create a calendar shifted to the Tokugawa shogunate, and the authority of the Imperial calendar was diminished after 1684. In that year, the astrology bureau of the Tokugawa bakufu created a "Japanese" calendar which was independent of Chinese almanacs.

== Events of the Jōkyō era ==
- 1684 (Jōkyō 1): A fire burned the Kyoto Imperial Palace to ashes. The reconstruction took a year.
- 1684 (Jōkyō 1): Having met with success in Osaka's kabuki theater, Chikamatsu Monzaemon began to write plays for the kabuki audience in Heian-kyō. In part, his success stemmed from the way his work would sometimes mirror current happenings and contemporary urban characters.
- March 26, 1685 (Jōkyō 2, 22nd day of the 2nd month): The former Emperor Go-Sai died. A large comet appeared in the night sky.
- April 13, 1686 (Jōkyō 3, 21st day of the 3rd month): Emperor Reigen abdicated in favor of his son, who become Emperor Higashiyama. After abdication, Reigen's new home was called the Sentō-gosho (The Palace for an Ex-Emperor). The Jōkyō Uprising occurred in October.
- December 20, 1687 (Jōkyō 4, 16th day of the 11th month): The esoteric Daijō-sai ceremony, having been in abeyance since the time of Emperor Go-Kashiwabara—for nine reigns—was revived because of the bakufu's insistence. This Shinto ritual is performed only once by each emperor during the enthronement ceremonies.

== See also ==
- Edo period
- Jōkyō calendar

Preceded by Tenna (天和)	Era or nengō Jōkyō (貞享); 1684–1688	Succeeded by Genroku (元禄)
