= Tokugawa Ietsuna =

Japanese Samurai, Daimyo and Military leader of Japan from 1651 to 1680

Senior First Rank Tokugawa Ietsuna
- 徳川 家綱
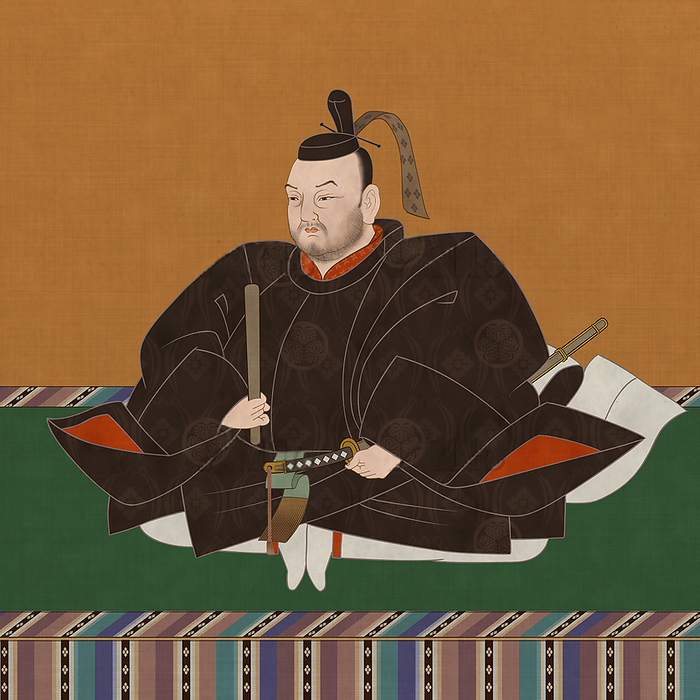
- Portrait by Kanō Yasunobu

Shōgun
- In office 10 September 1651 – 4 June 1680
- Monarchs: Go-Kōmyō; Go-Sai; Reigen
- Preceded by: Tokugawa Iemitsu
- Succeeded by: Tokugawa Tsunayoshi

Personal details
- Born: 7 September 1641 Edo, Tokugawa shogunate
- Died: 4 June 1680 (aged 38) Edo Castle, Edo, Tokugawa shogunate
- Children: Naohime
- Parents: Tokugawa Iemitsu; Houjuin
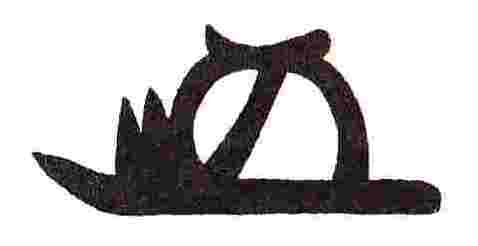
- Signature

Tokugawa Ietsuna (徳川 家綱; 7 September 1641 – 4 June 1680) was a Japanese samurai, daimyo and the fourth shōgun of the Tokugawa dynasty of Japan who was in office from 1651 to 1680. He is considered the eldest son of Tokugawa Iemitsu, which makes him the grandson of Tokugawa Hidetada and the great-grandson of Tokugawa Ieyasu.

== Early life (1641–1651) ==
Tokugawa Ietsuna was born in 1641, the eldest son of Tokugawa Iemitsu with his concubine, Oraku no Kata later Houjuin. Later Ietsuna was raised with his sister, Chiyohime (born by Ofuri) by Iemitsu's concubine, Oman no kata (later Eikoin) and Iemitsu's wife, Takatsukasa Takako later Honriin. After Eikoin retired, Senhime (also called Tenjuin) raised him with Honriin. At that time his father was shogun in his own right and had enacted several anti-Christian measures after the bloody Shimabara Rebellion of 1637. Though the suppression of this rebellion quelled all serious threats to Tokugawa rule, it was nonetheless an unsure era. Ietsuna was a frail child, and this carried over into his adult years. Nothing else is known of his youth. His childhood name was Takechiyo (竹千代).

== Family ==
Parents

- Father: Tokugawa Iemitsu (徳川 家光, 12 August 1604 – 8 June 1651)
- Mother: Hōjuin (1621–1653)
- Adopted mother: Eiko'in (1624–1711)
- Consorts and Issue:
- Wife: Asa no Miya Akiko (1640–1676) later Koge'in
- Concubine: Ofuri no Kata (1649–1667) later Yoshun'in
  - son (died in womb in 1667)
- Concubine: Mitsuru no Kata (1660–1690) later Enmyō'in
  - daughter (died in womb in 1678)
- Concubine: Yoshino no Kata (d. 1680)
  - son (died in womb in 1680)
- Concubine: Oyo no Kata (d. 1657)
- Concubine: Oshima no Kata (d. 1660)
- Concubine: Onatsu no Kata (d. 1680) later Honjuin
- Concubine: Okiku no Kata
- Concubine: Ofuji no Kata later Jokkoin
- Concubine: Okoto no Kata later Zumnyoin
- Concubine: Oran no Kata
- Concubine: Omino no Kata (d. 1679)
- Concubine: Osumi no Kata

Adopted daughter:

- Naohime, daughter of Tokugawa Mitsutomo

== Shogunal regency (1651–1663) ==
Tokugawa Iemitsu died in early 1651, at the age of forty-seven. After his death, the Tokugawa dynasty was at major risk. Ietsuna, the heir, was only ten years old. Nonetheless, despite his age, Tokugawa Ietsuna became shogun in Kei'an 4 (1651). Until he came of age, five regents were to rule in his place, but Shogun Ietsuna nevertheless assumed a role as formal head of the bakufu bureaucracy.

In this period, regents exercised power in the shogun's name. These were Sakai Tadakatsu, Sakai Tadakiyo, Inaba Masanori, Matsudaira Nobutsuna (a distant member of the Tokugawa), and one other. In addition to this regency, Iemitsu handpicked his half-brother, Hoshina Masayuki.

The first thing that Shogun Ietsuna and the regency had to address was the rōnin (masterless samurai). During the reign of Shogun Iemitsu, two samurai, Yui Shōsetsu and Marubashi Chūya, had been planning an uprising in which the city of Edo would be burned to the ground and, amidst the confusion, Edo Castle would be raided and the shōgun, other members of the Tokugawa and high officials would be executed. Similar occurrences would happen in Kyoto and Osaka. Shosetsu was himself of humble birth and he saw Toyotomi Hideyoshi as his idol.

Nonetheless, the plan was discovered after the death of Iemitsu, and Ietsuna's regents were brutal in suppressing the rebellion, which came to be known as the Keian Uprising or the "Tosa Conspiracy". Chuya was brutally executed along with his family and Shosetsu's family. Shosetsu chose to commit seppuku rather than being captured.

In 1652, about 800 rōnin led a small disturbance on Sado Island, and this was also brutally suppressed. But for the most part, the remainder of Ietsuna's rule was not disturbed anymore by the rōnin as the government became more civilian-oriented.

In Meireki 3 (1657), on the 18th–19th days of the 1st month, when Ietsuna was almost 20 years old, a great fire broke out in Edo and burned the city to the ground. Ietsuna's concubine Oyo burned to death in the fire. It took two years to rebuild the city and bakufu officials supervised the rebuilding of the city. In 1659, Ietsuna presided over the opening ceremonies. In the 11th month he married Asa no Miya Akiko, daughter of Fushimi no Miya Sadakiyo. It is said that his relationship was quite good with Asa no Miya, though they didn't have a child; they adopted Naohime, daughter of Tokugawa Mitsutomo.

== Bakufu power struggle (1663–1671) ==
In 1663, the regency for shōgun Ietsuna ended, but the regents still exercise authority, which was the first time that the power behind the bakufu was not a former shōgun. Ietsuna's chief advisors were Hoshina Masayuki, Ietsuna's uncle (for whom he had deep regard) Itakura Shigenori, Tsuchiya Kazunao, Kuze Hiroyuki, and Inaba Masanori. Even though Ietsuna was then ruling in his own right, those former regents became his official advisors, and in some cases, acted on his behalf. In some cases however, Ietsuna acted on his own accord, as when he abolished junshi, the custom in which a samurai committed suicide to follow his lord in death.

- 1663 (Kanbun 3). The shogunate banned suicides due to fidelity (junshi).
- 1669 (Kanbun 9). An Ainu rebellion broke out in Hokkaido.

In 1671, the Date clan of Sendai had a succession dispute. The bakufu intervened and prevented another reiteration of the Ōnin War. By that time many of the former regents were either dead or retired, and Ietsuna became more invested in the affairs of state.

== Shōgun (1671–1680) ==
Following the succession dispute of the Date, very few disturbances occurred for the remainder of Ietsuna's reign, except some defiant daimyōs.

In 1679, shōgun Ietsuna fell ill. His succession began to be discussed, in which Sakai Tadakiyo took an active role. He suggested that a son of Emperor Go-Sai become the next shogun, following the precedent of the later Kamakura shoguns, who in reality were members of the blood royal. Tadakiyo probably saw himself as becoming powerful like the Hōjō regents, and thus many members of the Tokugawa blood preferred Shogun Ietsuna's younger brother Tokugawa Tsunayoshi, also a son of Shogun Iemitsu, to become shōgun.

- 4 June 1680 (Enpō 8, 8th day of the 5th month): Shōgun Ietsuna dies; and he is succeeded as shogun by Tsunayoshi.

Tadakiyo retired, embarrassed, and shortly after, Tokugawa Ietsuna died in 1680. His posthumous name was Genyū-in (厳有院) and was buried in Kan'ei-ji. He was succeeded by his younger brother, Tsunayoshi.

Though Ietsuna proved to be an able leader, affairs were largely controlled by the regents his father had appointed, even after Ietsuna was declared old enough to rule in his own right.

== Eras of Ietsuna's bakufu ==
The years in which Ietsuna was shōgun are more specifically identified by more than one era name or nengō.

- Keian (1648–1652)
- Jōō (1652–1655)
- Meireki (1655–1658)
- Manji (1658–1661)
- Kanbun (1661–1673)
- Enpō (1673–1681)

== Ancestry ==
Ancestors of Tokugawa Ietsuna

8. Tokugawa Ieyasu, 1st Tokugawa Shōgun (1543-1616)
4. Tokugawa Hidetada, 2nd Tokugawa Shōgun (1579-1632)
9. Lady Saigō (1552-1589)
2. Tokugawa Iemitsu, 3rd Tokugawa Shōgun (1604-1651)
10. Azai Nagamasa (1545-1573)
5. Oeyo (1573-1626)
11. Oichi (1547-1583)
1. Tokugawa Ietsuna, 4th Tokugawa Shōgun
6. Aoki Santarō
3. Hōjuin (1621-1653)

== Notes ==
Military offices
Preceded by Tokugawa Iemitsu	Shōgun: Tokugawa Ietsuna; 1651–1680	Succeeded by Tokugawa Tsunayoshi
