= Emperor Go-Sai =

Emperor of Japan from 1655 to 1663

Emperor Go-Sai 後西天皇
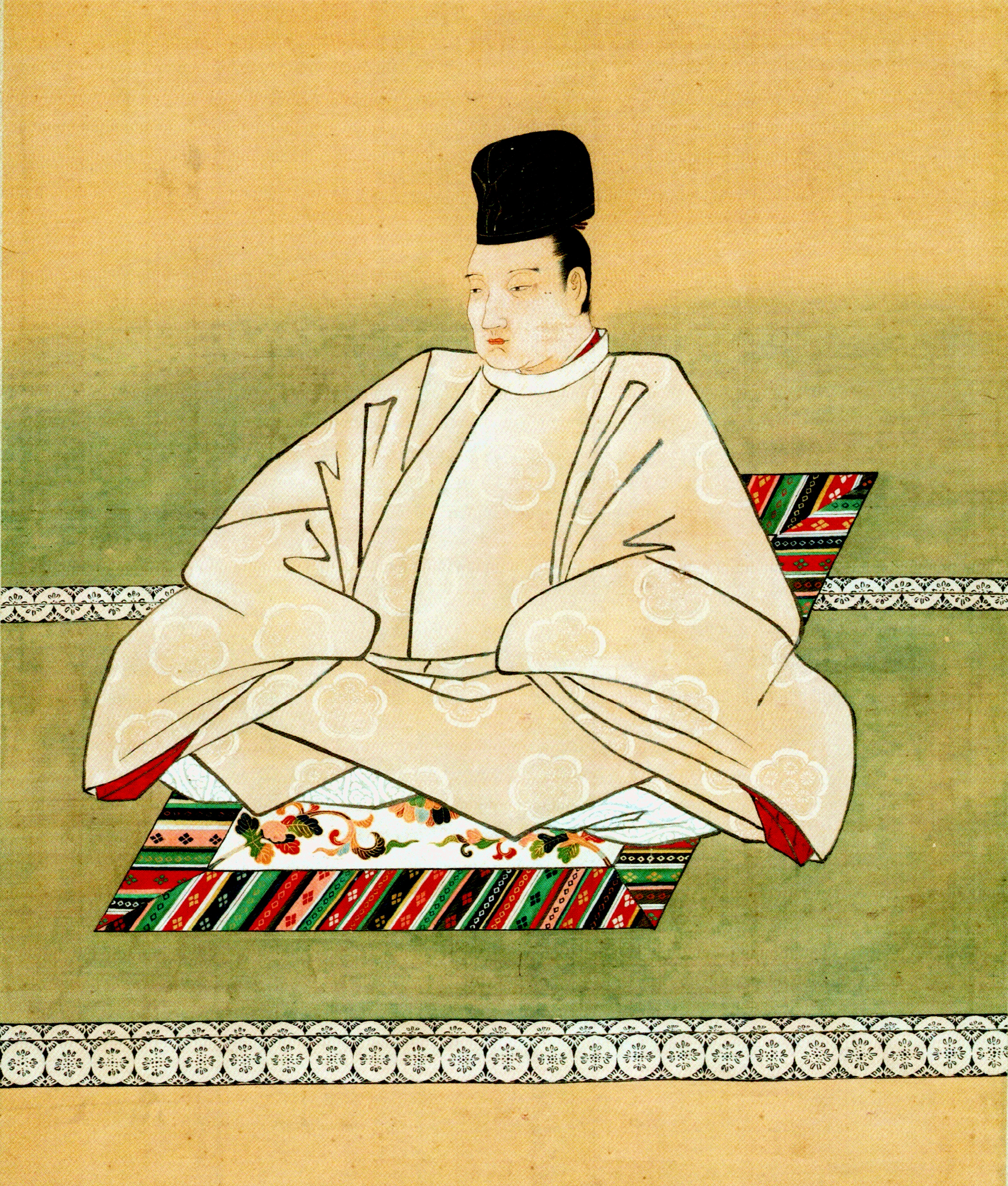
- Portrait by Prince Kōben

Emperor of Japan
- Reign: January 5, 1655 – March 5, 1663
- Enthronement: February 17, 1656
- Predecessor: Go-Kōmyō
- Successor: Reigen
- Shōguns: Tokugawa Ietsuna
- Born: Nagahito (良仁); January 1, 1638; Kyoto, Kyoto Prefecture, Tokugawa shogunate
- Died: March 26, 1685 (aged 47); Tokugawa shogunate (Japan)
- Burial: Tsuki no wa no misasagi, Kyoto
- Spouse: Akiko
- Issue: See below
Posthumous name
- Tsuigō: Emperor Go-Sai (後西院 or 後西天皇)
- House: Imperial House of Japan
- Father: Emperor Go-Mizunoo
- Mother: Kushige (Fujiwara) Takako

Emperor Go-Sai (後西天皇, Go-Sai-tennō; January 1, 1638 – March 22, 1685), also known as Emperor Go-Saiin (後西院天皇, Go-Saiin-tennō), personal name Nagahito, was the 111th emperor of Japan, according to the traditional order of succession.

Go-Sai's reign spanned the years from 1655 through 1663.

This 17th-century sovereign was named after the 9th-century Emperor Junna and go- (後), translates as later, and thus, he could have been called the "Later Emperor Junna". Emperor Go-Sai could not pass the throne onto his descendants. For this reason, he was known as the Go-Saiin emperor, after an alternate name of Emperor Junna, who had confronted and reached an accommodation with similar issues. This emperor was also called "Emperor of the Western Palace" (西院の帝, Saiin no mikado). The Japanese word go has also been translated to mean the second one, and thus, this emperor might be identified as "Junna II". During the Meiji era, the name became just Go-Sai.

== Genealogy ==
Before Go-Sai's accession to the Chrysanthemum Throne, his personal name (imina) was Nagahito (良仁) or Yoshihito; and his pre-accession title was Hide-no-miya (秀宮) or Momozono-no-miya.

He was the eighth son of Emperor Go-Mizunoo. He was raised as if he were the son of Tōfuku-mon'in; both former Empress Meishō and former Emperor Go-Kōmyō were his older half-siblings.

Emperor Go-Sai's Imperial family lived with him in the Dairi of the Heian Palace. This family included at least 16 sons and 17 daughters, none of whom would ascend to the throne.

- Nyōgo: Princess Akiko (明子女王; 1638–1680) later Myokichijou’in (妙吉祥院), Imperial Prince Takamatsu-no-miya Yoshihito's daughter
  - First daughter: Imperial Princess Tomoko (1654–1686; 誠子内親王)
  - First son: Imperial Prince Hachijō-no-miya Osahito (1655–1675; 八条宮長仁親王) – fourth Hachijō-no-miya, Hachijō-no-miya Yasuhito's adopted son
- Lady-in-waiting: Seikanji Tomoko (d.1695; 清閑寺共子), Seikanji Tomotsuna's daughter
  - Second son: Imperial Prince Arisugawa-no-miya Yukihito (1656–1695; 有栖川宮幸仁親王) – 3rd Arisugawa-no-miya
  - Second daughter: Second Princess (Onna-Ni-no-miya, 1657–1658; 女二宮)
  - Third daughter: Princess Sōei (1658–1721; 宗栄女王)
  - Fourth daughter: Princess Sonsyū (1661–1722; 尊秀女王)
  - Fourth son: Imperial Prince Priest Gien (1662–1706; 義延法親王)
  - Sixth daughter: Princess Enkōin (1663; 円光院宮)
  - Fifth son: Imperial Prince Priest Tenshin (1664–1690; 天真法親王)
  - Seventh daughter: Princess Kaya (1666–1675; 賀陽宮)
  - Tenth daughter: Imperial Princess Mashiko (1669–1738; 益子内親王) married Kujo Sukezane
  - Eleventh daughter: Princess Rihō (1672–1745; 理豊女王)
  - Thirteenth daughter: Princess Zuikō (1674–1706; 瑞光女王)
- Consort: Iwakura Tomoki's Daughter
  - Third son: Imperial Prince Priest Eigo (1659–1676; 永悟法親王)
- Consort: Ukyō-no-Tsubone (右京局), Tominokōji Yorinao's Daughter
  - Fifth daughter: Princess Tsune (1661–1665; 常宮)
- Consort: Umenokōji Sadako (梅小路定子), Umenokōji Sadanori's adopted daughter and Kōgenji Tomohide's daughter
  - Eighth daughter: Princess Kaku (1667–1668; 香久宮)
  - Ninth daughter: Princess Syō'an (1668–1712; 聖安女王)
  - Sixth son: Imperial Prince Priest Kōben (1669–1716; 公弁法親王)
  - Seventh son: Imperial Prince Priest Dōyū (1670–1691; 道祐法親王)
  - Eighth son: Imperial Prince Hachijō-no-miya Naohito (1671–1689; 八条宮尚仁親王) – fifth Hachijō-no-miya
  - Twelfth daughter: Princess Mitsu (1672–1677; 満宮)
  - Fourteenth daughter: Princess Sonkō (1675–1719; 尊杲女王)
  - Fifteenth daughter: Princess Sonsyō (1676–1703; 尊勝女王)
  - Eleventh son: Imperial Prince Priest Ryō'ou (1678–1708; 良応法親王)
  - Sixteenth daughter: Ryougetsuin (1679; 涼月院) (there is still doubt about birth mother)
- Consort: Azechi-no-tsubone (按察使局, Takatsuji Toyonaga's Daughter
  - Ninth son: Imperial Prince Priest Sondō (道尊法親王) (1676–1705; Buddhist Priest)
- Consort: Matsuki Atsuko (松木条子), Matsuki Muneatsu's Daughter
  - Tenth son: Prince Roei’in (槿栄院宮; 1677)

== Events of Go-Sai's life ==
Nagahito-shinnō became emperor when his emperor-brother died. This death left the throne vacant and the succession (senso) was received by the new monarch. Shortly thereafter, Emperor Go-Sai is considered to have acceded to the throne (sokui). The events during his lifetime shed light on his reign. The years of Go-Sai's reign correspond with a period in which Tokugawa Ietsuna was the leader at the pinnacle of the Tokugawa shogunate.

Go-Sai married the daughter of the first Takamatsu-no-miya Yoshihito (高松宮好仁親王); and he succeeded as second Takamatsu-no-miya. Then this Imperial prince became the emperor as a temporary measure until his younger brother, Imperial Prince Satohito (識仁親王, Satohito-shinnō) could grow older.

- January 1, 1638: The birth of an Imperial prince who will become known by the posthumous name of Go-Sai-tennō.
- January 5, 1655: The death of Go-Kōmyō caused the succession (senso) to be passed to his brother; and when the succession (senso) was received, the reign of Emperor Go-Sai was deemed to commence.
- 1655 (Meireki 1): The new ambassador of Korea, arrived in Japan.
- March 2–3, 1657 (Meireki 3, 18–19th days of the 1st month): Great Fire of Meireki: The city of Edo was devastated by a violent fire.
- 1659 (Manji 5): In Edo, construction begins on the Ryōgoku Bridge (ryōgokubashi).
- 1661 (Manji 6): Imperial Palace in Kyoto is burnt to the ground; and the Gekū at Yamada was seriously damaged by fire.
- March 20, 1662 (Kanbun 2, 1st day of the 2nd month): There was a violent earthquake in Kyoto which destroyed the tomb of the Taiko, Toyotomi Hideyoshi.
- 1662 (Kanbun 2): Emperor Gosai ordered Tosa Hiromichi 土佐広通 (1561–1633), a Tosa-school disciple, to adopt the name Sumiyoshi (probably in reference to a 13th-century painter, Sumiyoshi Keinin 住吉慶忍), upon assuming a position as official painter for the Sumiyoshi Taisha 住吉大社).
- March 5, 1663 (Kanbun 3, 26th day of the 1st month): Emperor Go-Sai abdicated, which meant that the Prince Satohito received the succession (senso). Shortly thereafter, Emperor Reigen formally acceded to the throne (sokui).

After abdicating, Go-sai put his heart into scholarship and he left behind many books, including the "Water and Sun Collection" (Suinichishū, 水日集). He was talented in waka; and he had a profound understanding of the classics.

During his reign, because of great fires at the Grand Ise Shrine, Osaka Castle, and the Imperial Palace, among others, the Great Meireki Fire, earthquakes in the region, and because of repeated floods, many people blamed the Emperor, saying he lacked moral virtue.

- March 26, 1685 (Jōkyō 2, 22nd day of the 2nd month): Former-Emperor Go-Sai died; and a great comet was observed crossing the night sky.

Emperor Go-Sai is enshrined in the imperial mausoleum, Tsuki no wa no misasagi, at Sennyū-ji in Higashiyama-ku, Kyoto. Also enshrined are Go-Sai's immediate predecessors, Emperor Go-Mizunoo, Empress Meishō and Go-Kōmyō. Go-Sai's immediate Imperial successors, including Reigen, Higashiyama, Nakamikado, Sakuramachi, Momozono, Go-Sakuramachi and Go-Momozono, are enshrined here as well.

At the Kitano Shrine, a tablet over the Chu-mon entryway reads tenmangu in the calligraphy of Emperor Go-sai.

=== Kugyō ===
Kugyō (公卿) is a collective term for the very few most powerful men attached to the court of the Emperor of Japan in pre-Meiji eras. Even during those years in which the court's actual influence outside the palace walls was minimal, the hierarchic organization persisted.

In general, this elite group included only three to four men at a time. These were hereditary courtiers whose experience and background would have brought them to the pinnacle of a life's career. During Go-Sai's reign, this apex of the Daijō-kan included:

- Kampaku, Nijō Mitsuhira, 1653–1663
- Sadaijin
- Udaijin
- Naidaijin
- Dainagon

== Eras of Go-Sai-tennō's reign ==
The years of Go-Sai's reign are more specifically identified by more than one era name or nengō.

- Jōō (1652–1655)
- Meireki (1655–1658)
- Manji (1658–1661)
- Kanbun (1661–1673)

== Ancestry ==
Ancestors of Emperor Go-Sai

8. Prince Masahito (1552–1586)
4. Emperor Go-Yōzei (1571–1617)
9. Kanshūji Haruko (1553–1620)
2. Emperor Go-Mizunoo (1596–1680)
10.Konoe Sakihisa (1536–1612)
5.Konoe Sakiko (1575–1630)
11. Takeda
1. Emperor Go-Sai
12. Shōin Koji
6. Kushige Takachika (1556–1613)
3. Kushige Takako (1604–1685)

== See also ==
- Emperor of Japan
- List of Emperors of Japan
- Imperial cult

Regnal titles
Preceded by Emperor Go-Kōmyō	Emperor of Japan: Go-Sai; 1655–1663	Succeeded by Emperor Reigen
