= Hōkō-ji (Kyoto) =

Buddhist temple in Kyoto, Japan

Coordinates: 34°59′32″N 135°46′19″E

Hōkō-ji 方広寺
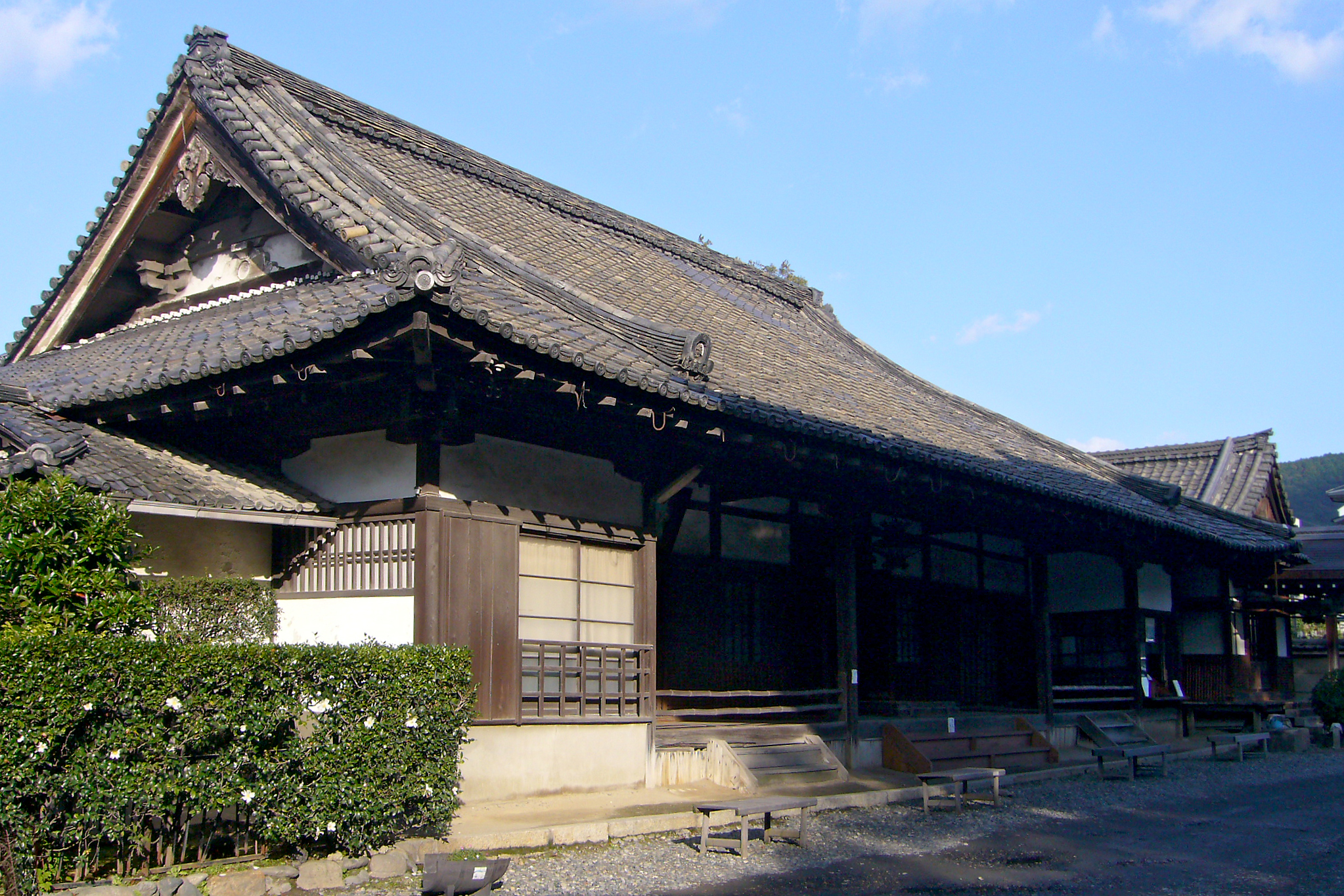
- Hondo

Religion
- Affiliation: Tendai

Location
- Country: Japan
- Interactive map of Hōkō-ji 方広寺

Architecture
- Founder: Ashikaga Yoshimitsu; Shun’oku Myoha/Muso Soseki
- Completed: 1586

Hōkō-ji (方広寺, Hōkō-ji) (or Great Buddha of Kyoto) is a temple in Kyoto, Japan, dating from the 16th century. Toyotomi Hideyoshi determined that the capital city should have a Daibutsu (Great Buddha of Kyoto) temple to surpass that of Nara. He is reputed to have claimed at the outset that he would complete construction in half the time it took Emperor Shōmu to complete the Great Buddha of Nara. The project during Emperor Shomū's reign took ten years. Hideyoshi would complete the initial phase of his project in only three years. The architects for this project were Nakamura Masakiyo and Heinouchi Yoshimasa.

== History ==
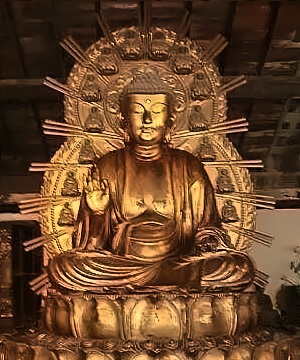
Replica of Great Buddha of Kyoto

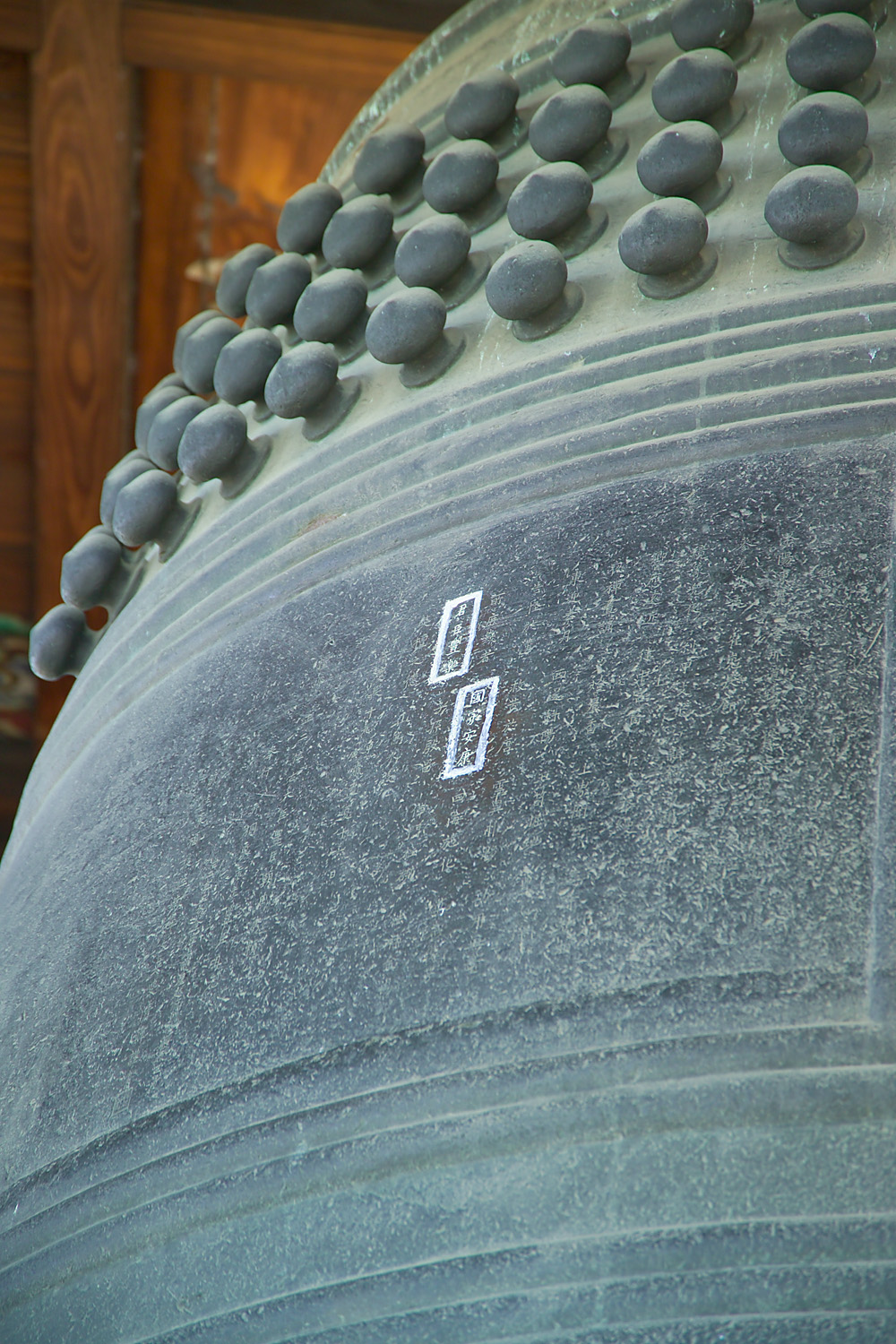
Temple bell at Hōkō-ji

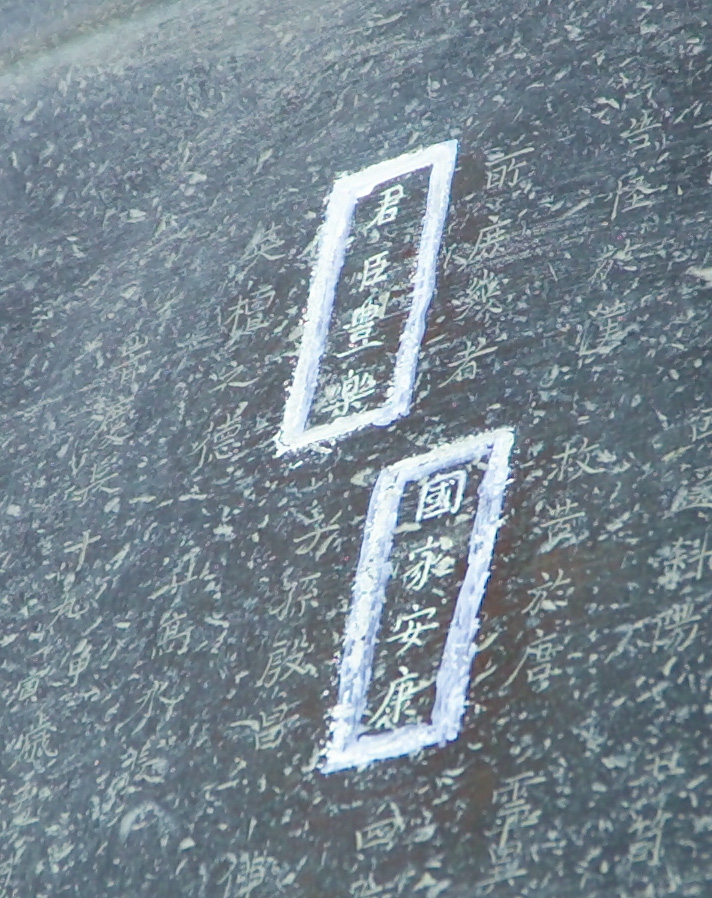
Inscription on bell at Hōkō-ji

- Tenshō 14, in the 10th month (1586): With the approval of Emperor Go-Yōzei, Hideyoshi ordered land-surveys as he prepared to begin construction of a Daibutsu-ji in Heian-kyō.
- Tenshō 16 (1588): Construction on the temple commenced, and the work moved forward in an area where the Kyoto National Museum now stands. Constructed in Tensho 16 (1588), this stone structure once had a tiled-roofed and mud walls, with pillars marking the walls of the Daibutsu-den's central space. – see example of the iron rings used to hold together and re-inforce columns in the great hall of the Daibutsu-den
- Tenshō 16 (1588):Hideyoshi's sword hunt edict required that all weapons must be relinquished by non-samurai—including long swords, short swords, bows, spears and firearms; and the edict explained that the metal was to be melted down into nails and clamps to be used in creating a grand statue of Buddha at Hōkō-ji, thus earning merit in this life and the next.
- Tenshō 17, in the 10th month (1589): The priest Kokei of Daitoku-ji was nominated founder of the new temple; and Shōkōin-no-Miya Kōi Hōshinnō conducted the dedication ceremony with a thousand priests in attendance.
- Bunroku 4 (1595): Hideyoshi summons a thousand priests from 8 Buddhist sects to mass service at Hōkō-ji in honor of his ancestors.– Nichiren sect priests decline to participate
- Bunroku 5 (August 14, 1596): An earthquake destroyed both the image of the buddha and the completed Daibutsu-den.
- Keichō 3 (September 17, 1598): Work was begun to replace the temporary structure which was built after the Bunroku earthquake, and the borrowed statue of Buddha was returned to Zenkō-ji as work began on reconstructing a new large statue of the buddha as well; but this work was halted the following month when Hideyoshi died at the age of 63 on the 18th day of the 8th month of Keichō 3.
- Keichō 7 (January 15, 1602): A fire at the Hōkō-ji temple complex in Kyoto was caused by careless workmen; and the great image of the buddha and the structure housing the statue, the Daibutsu-den, were both consumed by the flames.
- Keichō 15 (November 15, 1610): Toyotomi Hideyori decided to sponsor work which had begun to rebuild the Hōkō-ji in line with the plans which his father had supported; and this would include recreating the great statue of the buddha in bronze to replace the wooden image which had been burned. At this time, Hideyori also decided to order a great bell cast in bronze.
- Keichō 19 (August 24, 1614): A new bronze bell for the Hōkō-ji was cast successfully;– see 19th-century photo of Hōkō-ji bell– see old photo of bell and dedication ceremonies were scheduled, but at the last minute, Ieyasu forbade the ceremonies to take place.

"[T]he tablet over the Daibatsu-den and the bell bore the inscription "Kokka ankō" (meaning "the country and the house, peace and tranquility"), and at this Tokugawa Ieyasu affected to take umbrage, alleging that it was intended as a curse on him for the character 安 (an, "peace") was placed between the two characters composing his own name 家康 ("ka-kō", "house tranquility") [suggesting subtly perhaps that peace could only be attained by Ieyasu's dismemberment?] ... This incident of the inscription was, of course, a mere pretext, but Ieyasu realized that he could not enjoy the power he had usurped as long as Hideyori lived, and consequently, although the latter more than once dispatched his kerei Katagiri Kastumoto to Sunpu Castle with profuse apologies, Ieyasu refused to be placated."

- Kanbun 2 (June 16, 1662): An earthquake destroys the temple, the great statue, and the Daibutsu-den; and some accounts say that Shōgun Ietsuna used the metal to coin sen.
- Kanbun 4–7 (1664–1667): Rebuilding and repairs were made; and a gilt wooden statue replaced the bronze statue which had been destroyed. A drawing made by Engelbert Kaempfer after his 1691 visit to Hōkō-ji was the first image of any Japanese Daibutsu image published in the West.
- An'ei 4 (September 5, 1775): Lightning struck the Hōkō-ji, but the fires were quickly contained and the damage was slight.
- Kansei 10 (August 12, 1798): Lightning struck, and the Daibutsu-den is entirely burnt along with other nearby structures; but instead of rebuilding, a small gold image which had been kept in the eyebrow of the old statue of the buddha was saved, and this became the central image of the diminished Hōkō-ji. The structure in which this small statue was displayed rested on the approximate site of the Imperial Household Museum in late-Taisho/early-Showa Kyoto.– see view of stone wall under which was part of the original Hōkō-ji foundations from Keichō 16 (1588)
- Kyōwa gannen or Kyōwa 1 (1801): An image one-tenth the size of Hideyoshi's Daibutsu was presented and installed in a temporary Hōkō-ji Daibutsu-den.
- Tenpō 15 (1845): A rich man from Owari province presented a gigantic wooden figure which was displayed until both the image of the buddha and the reconstructed Daibutsu-den were destroyed by fire in the late 20th century.– see old photo of the Hōkō-ji bell with a view of the 19th–20th century daibutsu-den
- Meiji 3 (1870): Hōkō-ji land subdivided—southern portion allotted to Kyōmei-gū and part of the central portion of land was used for the Meiji era reconstruction of the Hōkoku-jinja, with the result being that the size of this temple was considerably reduced.
- Meiji 3 (1870): Hōkō-ji belfry (Shōrō) which had been added in 1614 was pulled down and re-erected in a nearby location. The multi-ton bell had not been part of original construction, but over time, it has become irretrievably linked with the history of the temple.

== See also ==
- Ernest Henry Wilson – Wilson stump (ウィルソン株, Wilson kabu)
