= Ryōgoku =

District in Sumida, Tokyo

Coordinates: 35.694833°N 139.794052°E

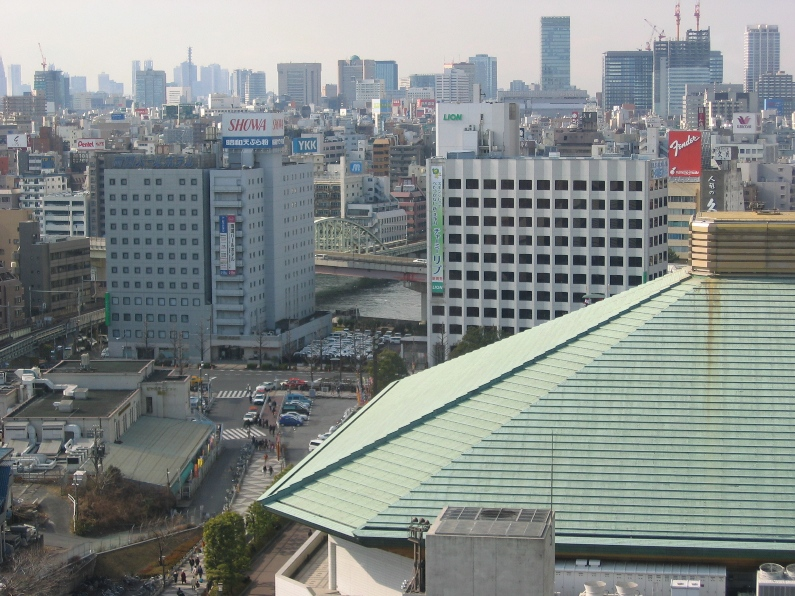
Ryōgoku Station and the surrounding area, with the Ryōgoku Kokugikan sumo stadium in the foreground

Ryōgoku (両国) is a district in Sumida, Tokyo. It is surrounded by various districts in Sumida, Chūō, and Taitō wards: Yokoami, Midori, Chitose, Higashi Nihonbashi, and Yanagibashi.

== History ==
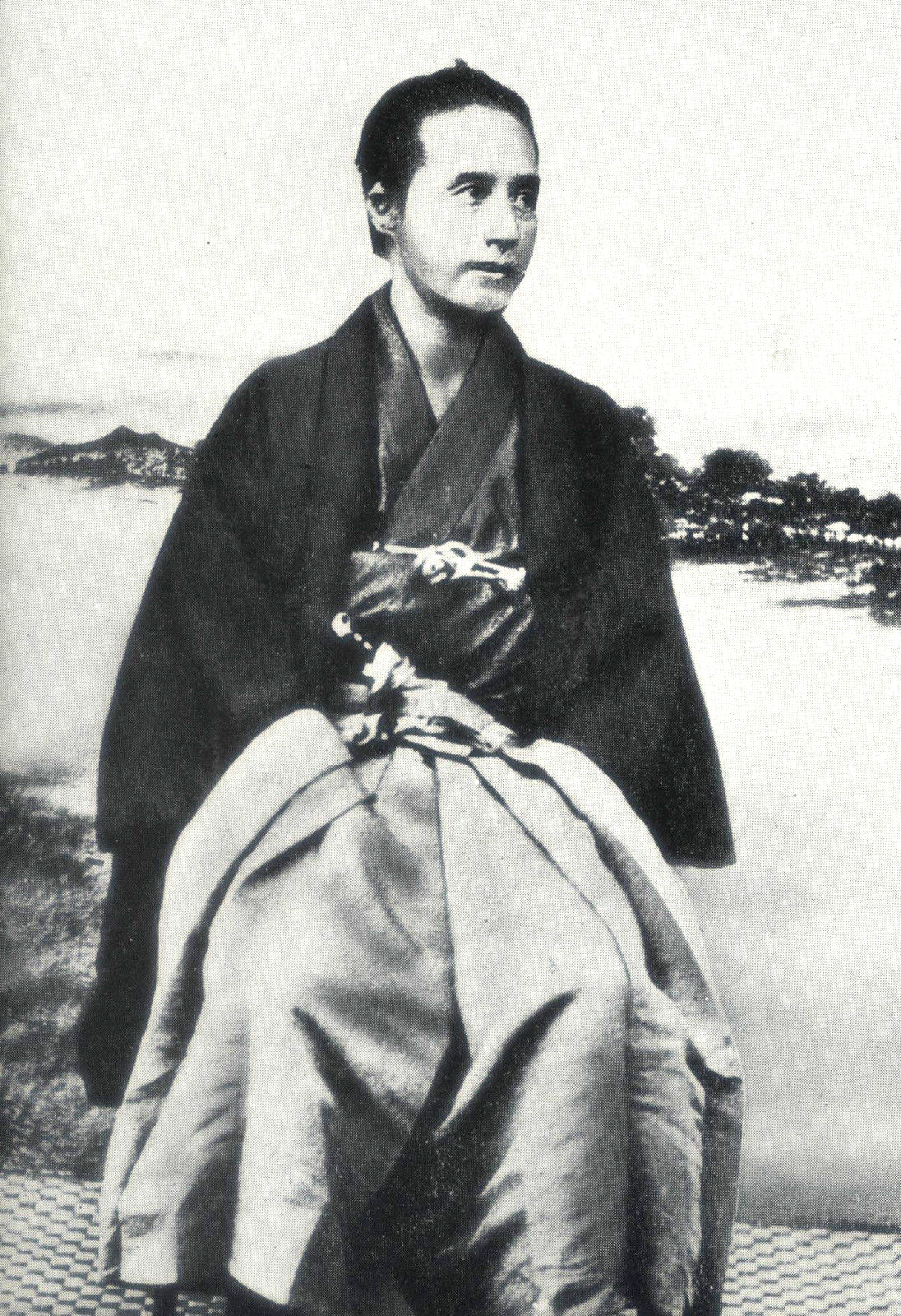
Katsu Kaishū was born in Ryōgoku

In 1659, the Ryōgoku Bridge was built, spanning the Sumida River just upstream of its confluence with the Kanda River. Its name, meaning "two provinces", came from its joining Edo (the forerunner of Tokyo in Musashi Province) and Shimōsa Province. The district derived its name from that of the bridge.

The Forty-seven rōnin avenged the death of their lord, Asano Naganori, by breaking into the mansion of his enemy, Kira Yoshinaka, in 1703. Part of the mansion has been preserved in a public park in Ryōgoku.

At 2 a.m. on 26 January 1881, a fire broke out in Ryōgoku. Due to strong seasonal winds, the fire spread throughout Tokyo and destroyed over 10,000 buildings. The fire was the largest of the Meiji era.

Ryōgoku Station in the neighboring Yokoami district was opened in 1904, bringing rail transportation to the area.

Ryōgoku is home to the Edo-Tokyo Museum.

== Sumo ==
Because the Ryōgoku bridge was developed in the region, during the Edo period this part of Tokyo became as significant as Ueno and Asakusa. Sumo wrestling began to grow very popular due to the Kanjin sumo, which were championships organized to raise money for the construction of temples. These tournaments were held at the Eko-in temple.

Ryōgoku is regarded as the heartland of professional sumo. Most training stables or heya are based there.

The first Ryōgoku Kokugikan stadium for sumo was completed in 1909. The present one was built in 1985 in the Yokoami district north of Ryōgoku. Three of professional sumo's six annual official tournaments take place there in January, May and September at the Ryōgoku Kokugikan.

== Education ==
Sumida City Board of Education (墨田区教育委員会) operates public elementary and junior high schools.

Ryōgoku is zoned to Ryōgoku Elementary School (両国小学校) and Ryōgoku Junior High School (両国中学校).

== Notable people ==
Famous people connected with Ryōgoku include Katsu Kaishū, statesman and naval engineer, who was born there in 1823. Novelist Ryūnosuke Akutagawa was raised in the district. Television personality and former member of the House of Councillors Kyosen Ōhashi was born there.
