= Zenkō-ji (Gifu) =

Buddhist temple in Gifu Prefecture, Japan

Coordinates: 35°25′41″N 136°46′05″E

Zenkō-ji 善光寺
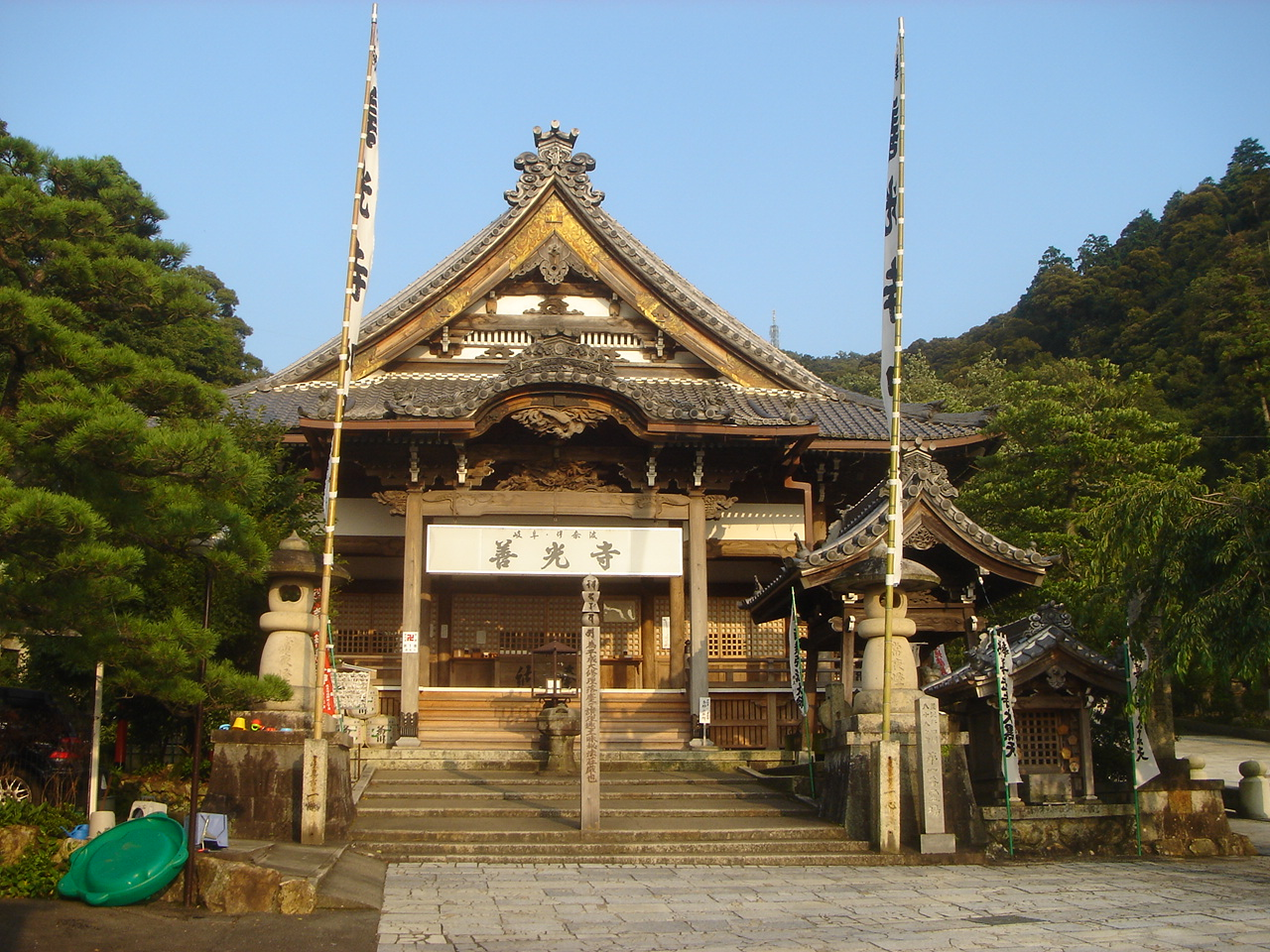
- Zenkō-ji's main hall

Religion
- Affiliation: Shingon sect

Location
- Location: 1-8 Inaba-dōri, Gifu, Gifu Prefecture
- Country: Japan
- Interactive map of Zenkō-ji 善光寺

Architecture
- Completed: late 16th century

Website
- Zenkō-ji

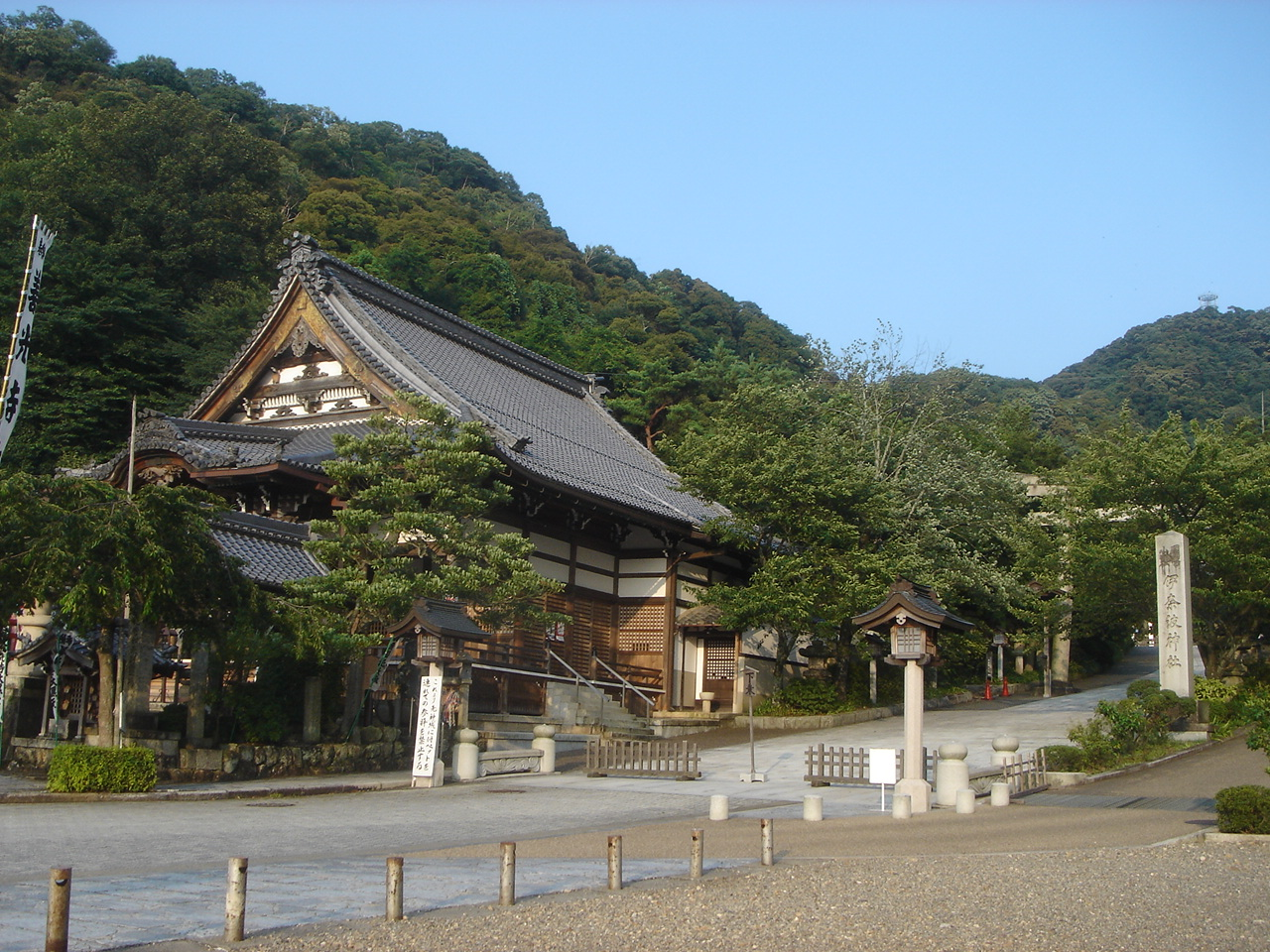
Side view of Zenkō-ji

Zenkō-ji (善光寺, Temple of the Benevolent Light) is a Buddhist temple of the Shingon sect in Mino Province (modern-day Gifu, Gifu Prefecture, Japan). It is a branch temple of Daigo-ji in Kyoto, Kyoto Prefecture, Japan. It is also referred to as Gifu Zenkō-ji (岐阜善光寺) and Inaba Zenkō-ji (伊奈波善光寺). It is not known when the temple was built, though it assumed to have been built between 1592 and 1600 when Oda Nobunaga was living in nearby Gifu Castle. During the early Edo period, it received the name Zenkō-ji Anjō-in (善光寺安乗院) because the two temples were merged at the time.

== History ==
In 1582, after the deaths of Takeda Shingen and Takeda Katsuyori, Nobunaga brought the temple's gohonzon to base of Inaba Shrine from neighboring Shinano Province. However, after Nobunaga's death during the Honnō-ji Incident that same year, Oda Nobukatsu, his son, brought the gohonzon (main objects of worship) to Jimoku-ji (甚目寺) in what is now Aichi Prefecture.

The gohonzon, however, later fell into the hands of Tokugawa Ieyasu, who brought them to a temple in Ōmi Province. They were again moved again in 1597, after Toyotomi Hideyoshi gained control of them and brought them to Hōkō-ji in Kyoto. The following year, they were returned to Shinano Province. Nobunaga's grandson, Oda Hidenobu, built Inaba Zenkōji-dō (伊奈波善光寺堂) to house the gohonzon and this is when they were first dedicated.

At first, the gohonzon were rotated between Anjō-in (安乗院), Mangan-ji (満願寺) and Zenkō-ji. However, after the forcible separation of Buddhism and Shinto (shinbutsu bunri) in 1868, Mangan-ji, which had been on the grounds of Inaba Shrine, was dismantled while Anjō-in became an independent temple, keeping the gohonzon with it.

The main hall was completely burnt to the ground as a result of the 1891 Mino–Owari earthquake. The reconstructed main hall was completed in 1912.
