= Kanbun (era) =

Period of Japanese history (1661–1673)

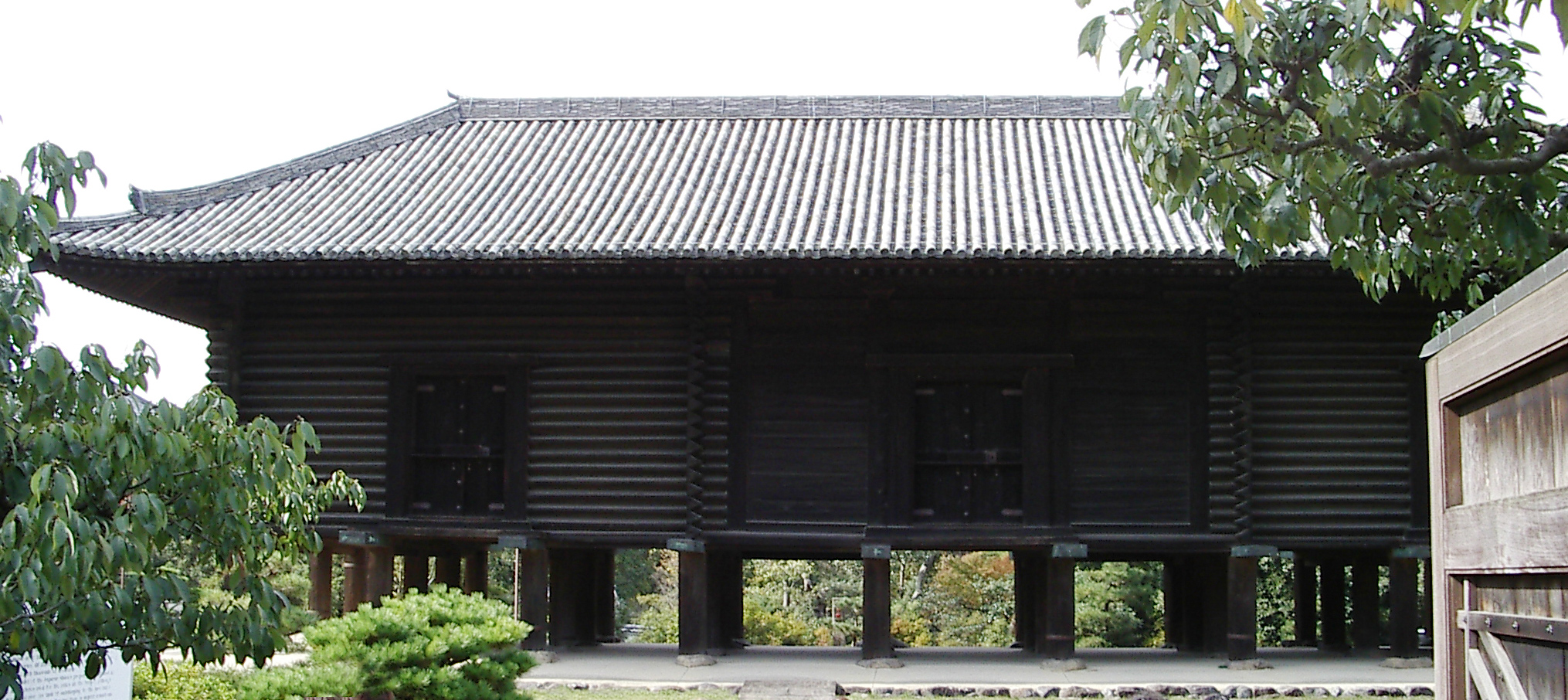

Kanbun (寛文) was a Japanese era (年号, nengō; "year name") after Manji and before Enpō. This period spanned the years from April 1661 to September 1673. The reigning emperors were Go-Sai-tennō (後西天皇) and Reigen-tennō (霊元天皇).

== Change of era ==
- 1661 Kanbun gannen (寛文元年): The new era name of Kanbun (meaning "Generous Art") was created to mark a number of disasters, including a great fire at the Imperial Palace. The previous era ended and a new one commenced in Manji 4.

== Events of the Kanbun era ==
- March 20, 1662 (Kanbun 2, 1st day of the 2nd month): There was a violent earthquake in Heian-kyō which destroyed the tomb of Toyotomi Hideyoshi .
- 1662 (Kanbun 2): Emperor Gosai ordered Tosa Hiromichi (土佐広通, 1599–1670), a Tosa-school disciple, to adopt the name Sumiyoshi, probably in reference to a 13th-century painter, Sumiyoshi Keinin (住吉慶忍), upon assuming a position as official painter for the Sumiyoshi Taisha (住吉大社).
- March 5, 1663 (Kanbun 3, 26th day of the 1st month): Go-sai abdicated in favor of his younger brother, Satohito, aged 10; and then he lived in complete retirement until his death.
- June 6, 1663 (Kanbun 3, 1st day of the 5th month): An earthquake struck in Ōmi Province.
- 1665 (Kanbun 5, 6th month): Courts of inquiry were established in all the villages of the empire. These courts were charged with discovering the faith of the inhabitants, and their express purpose was to discover and eradicate all remnants of Christianity and Christian believers in Japan.
- 1668 (Kanbun 8, 1st day of the 2nd month): A major fire broke out in Edo—a conflagration lasting 45 days. The disastrous fire was attributed to arson. Residents of Edo and later historians of the period also called this the fire of the eighth year of Kanbun.
- 1669 (Kanbun 9): An Ainu rebellion, Shakushain's Revolt (1669–1672), breaks out in Hokkaido against the Matsumae clan
- 1670 (Kanbun 10): The Bonin Islands (Ogasawara Islands) are discovered by the Japanese when a ship bound for Edo from Kyūshū is blown off course by a storm.

== Notes ==
Preceded by Manji (万治)	Era or nengō Kanbun (寛文); 1661–1673	Succeeded by Enpō (延宝)
