= Ryōgoku Bridge =

Bridge in Tokyo, Japan

Coordinates: 35.69431°N 139.788719°E

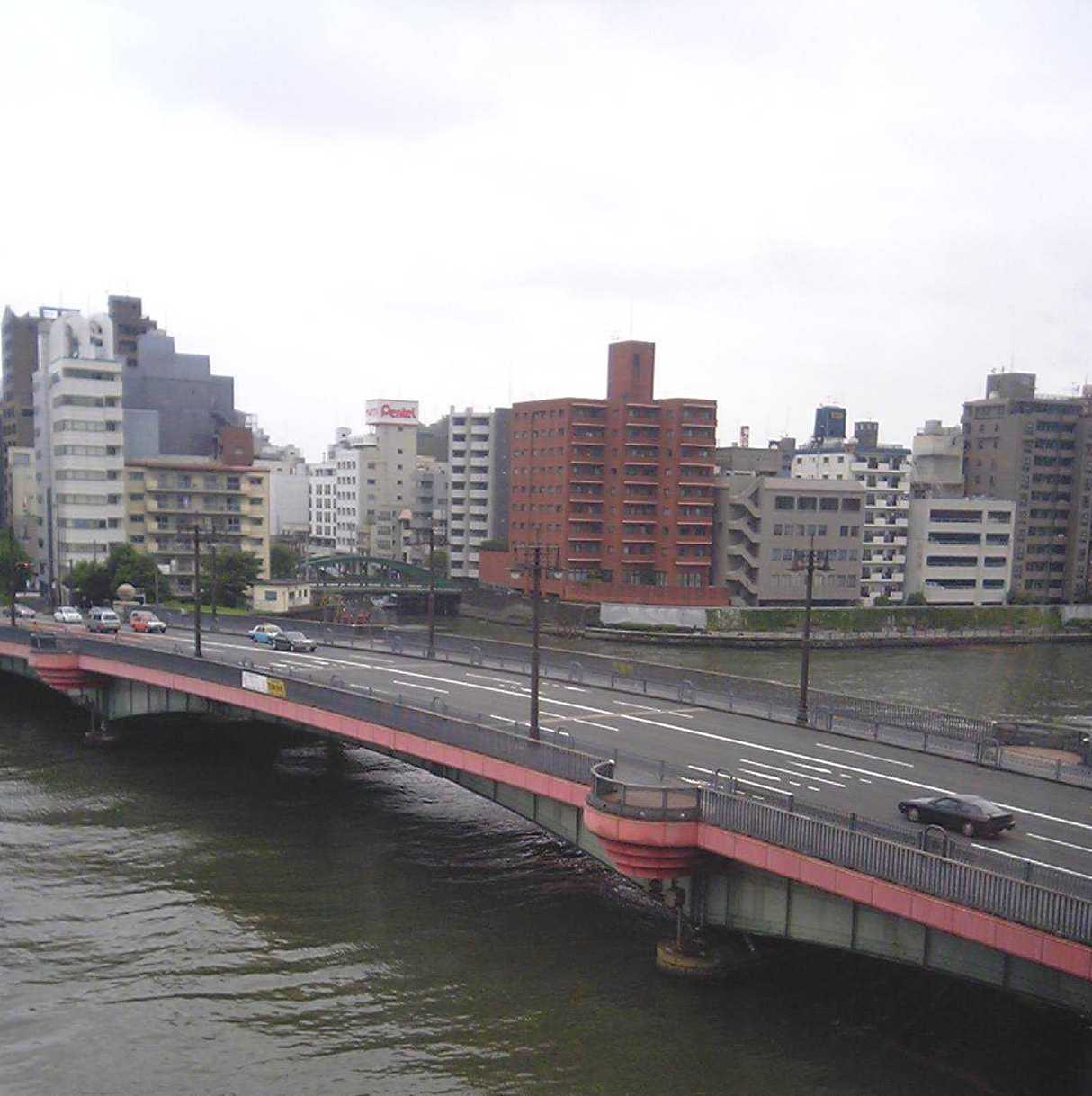
Ryōgoku Bridge (c. 2005)

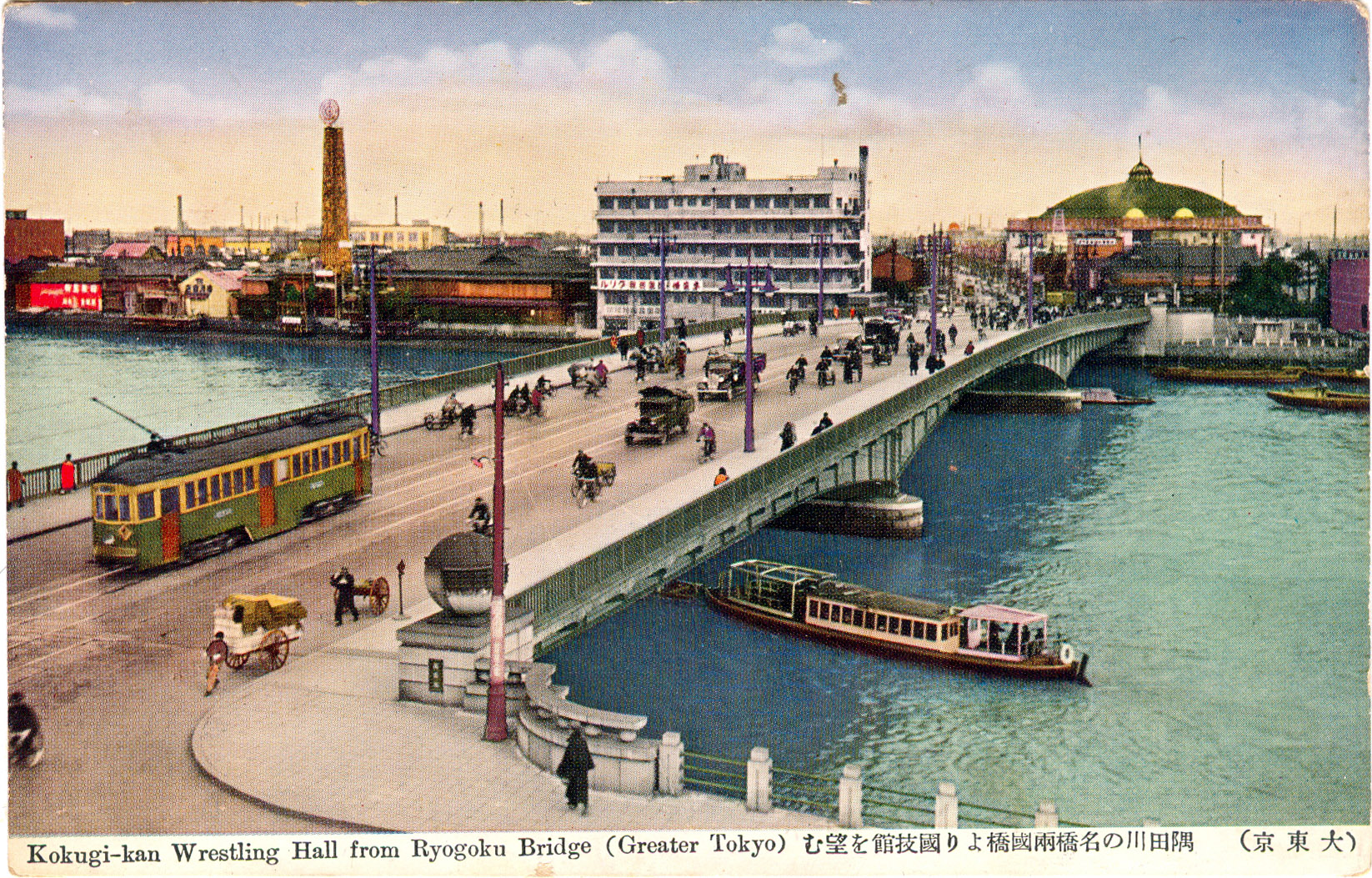
Ryōgoku Bridge and Ryōgoku Kokugikan in 1935

The Ryōgoku Bridge (両国橋, Ryōgoku-bashi) is a bridge in Tokyo built in 1659 spanning the Sumida River just upstream of its confluence with the Kanda River. Its name, meaning "two provinces", came from its joining Edo (the forerunner of Tokyo in Musashi Province) and Shimōsa Province. The neighborhood at the east end of the bridge, Ryōgoku, derived its name from that of the bridge. The bridge featured in the 2015 anime "Miss Hokusai".

== Timeline ==
- 1659 (Manji 2): Building began on the Ryōgoku Bridge.
- January 26, 1881: The Great Ryōgoku Fire occurs.
- September 1, 1923 (Taishō 12, 1st day of the 9th month): The bridge was damaged during the Great Kantō earthquake.
- 1932 (Shōwa 7): Bridge re-building completed.

== Gallery ==
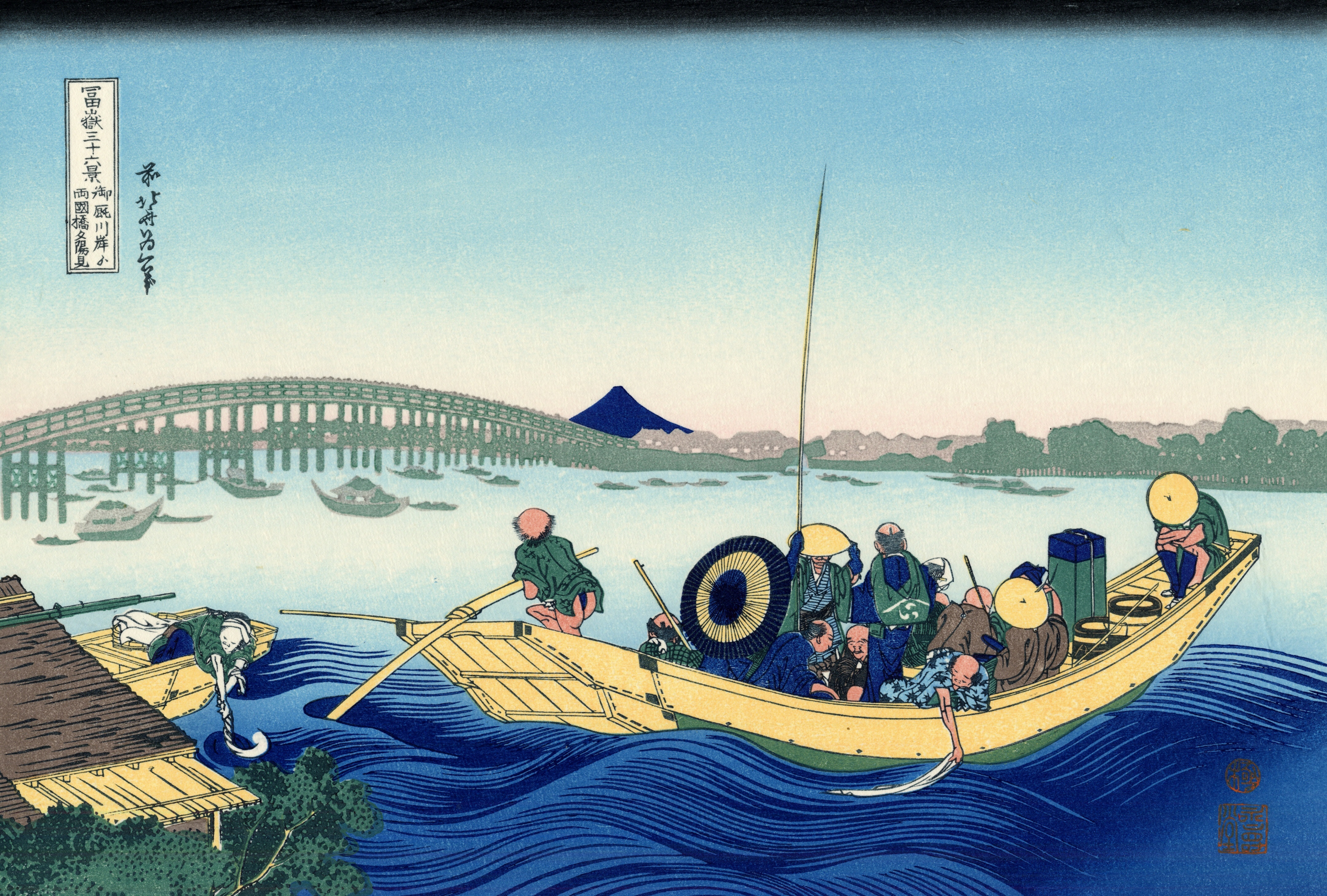
Hokusai

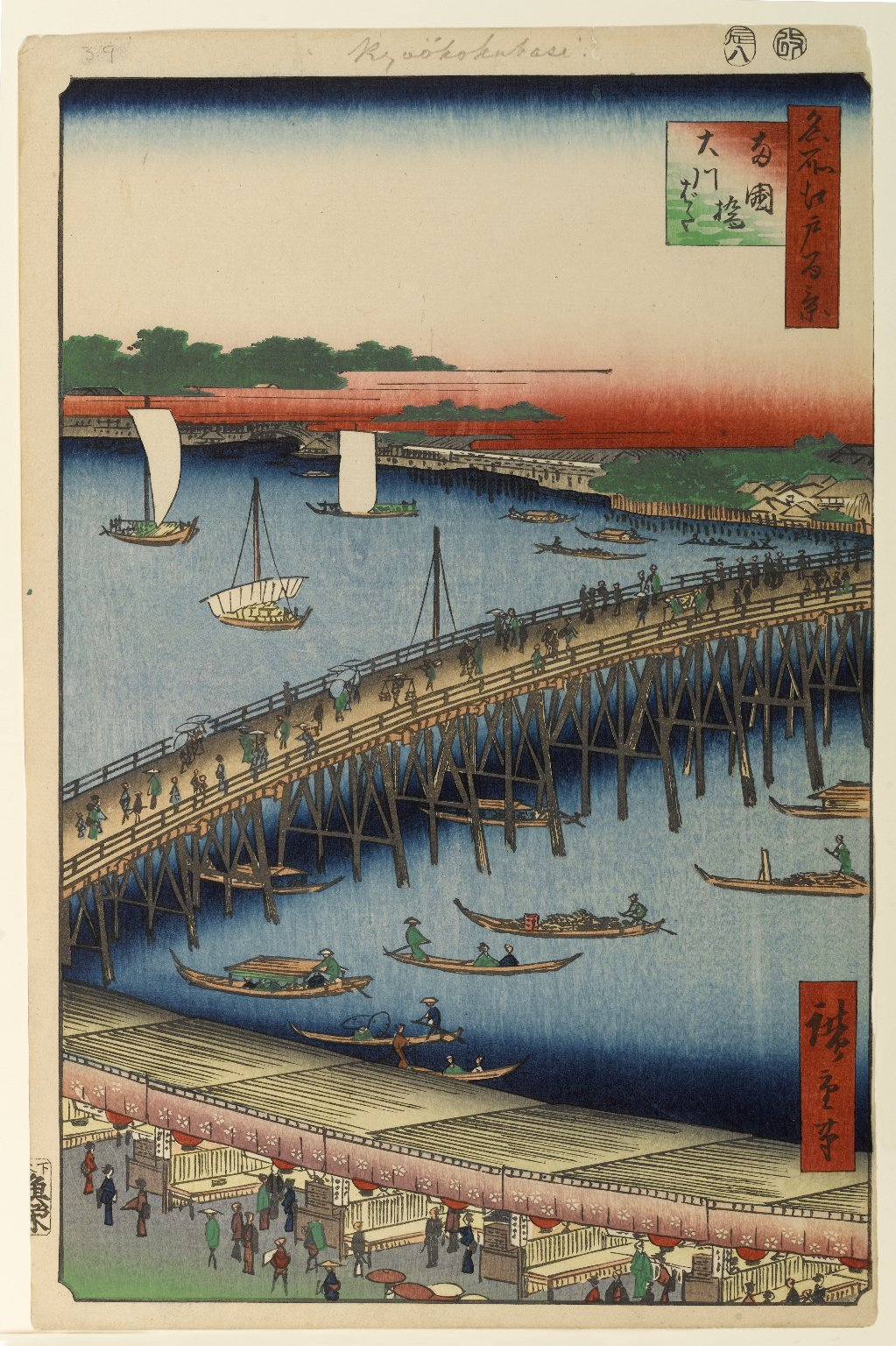
Ryōgoku Bridge and the Great Riverbank (8th Month, 1856) - Brooklyn Museum

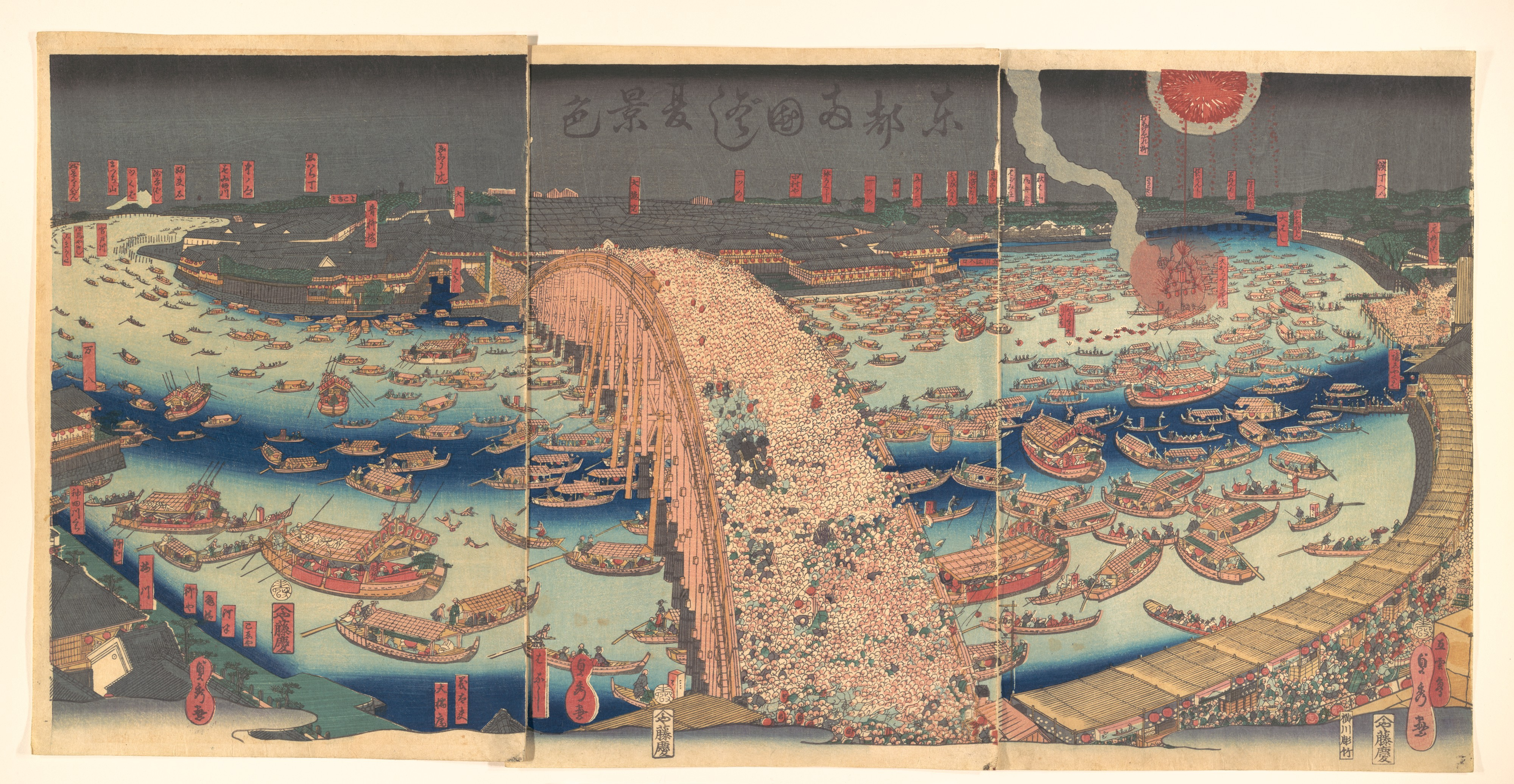
Panoramic View of Ryōgoku Bridge in the Summer (c. 1859)

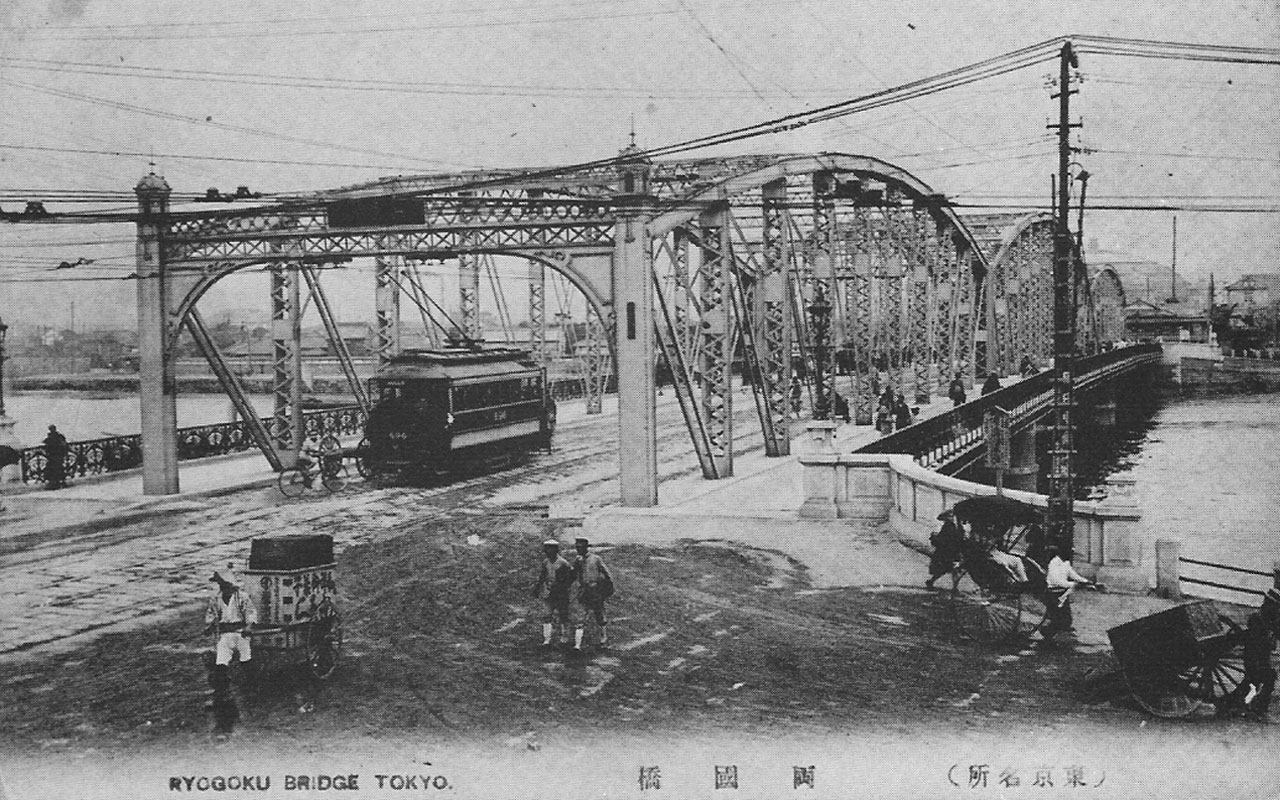
1904

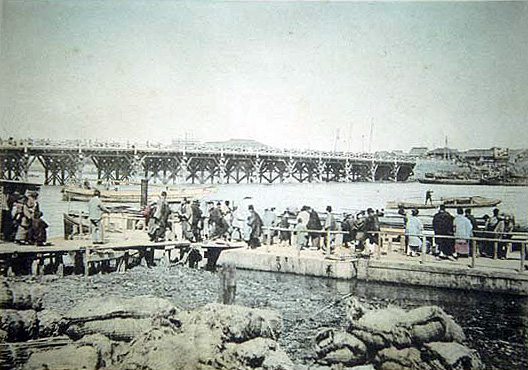
1875

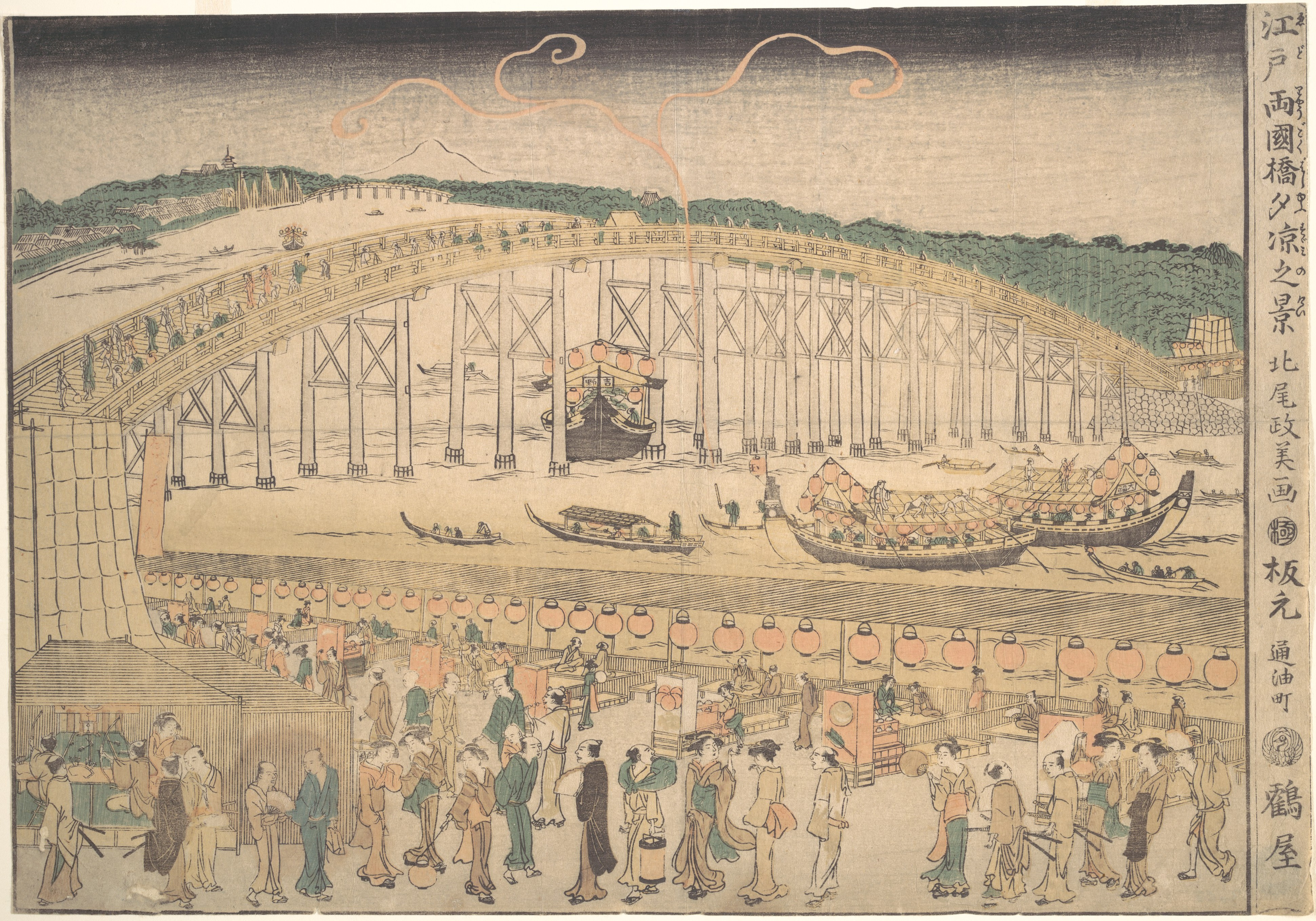
Ryōgoku Bridge (c. 1780)
