= Manji (era) =

Period of Japanese history (1658–1661)

Manji (万治) was a Japanese era name (年号, nengō, "year name") after Meireki and before Kanbun. This period spanned the years from July 1658 through April 1661. The reigning emperor was Go-Sai-tennō (後西天皇).

== Change of era ==
- 1658 Manji gannen (万治元年): The era name was changed to mark a disastrous, great fire in Edo. The previous era ended and a new one commenced in Meireki 4, on the 23rd day of the 7th month.

The source of this era name comes from the Records of the Grand Historian: "When the common people know their place, then all under heaven is ruled" (衆民乃定、万国為治)

== Events of the Manji era ==
- 1658 (Manji 1): In the aftermath of the Great Mereiki Fire, the shogunate organized four all-samurai, all-Edo firefighting squads.
- 1658 (Manji 1): Yanagisawa Yoshiyasu is born. Yoshiyasu will become Shōgun Tsunayoshi's favorite courtier and chief counselor.
- 1659 (Manji 2): In Edo, construction begins on the Ryōgoku Bridge (ryogokubashi).
- 1660 (Manji 3): Former rōjū Sakai Tadakatsu entered the Buddhist priesthood.

== Gallery ==
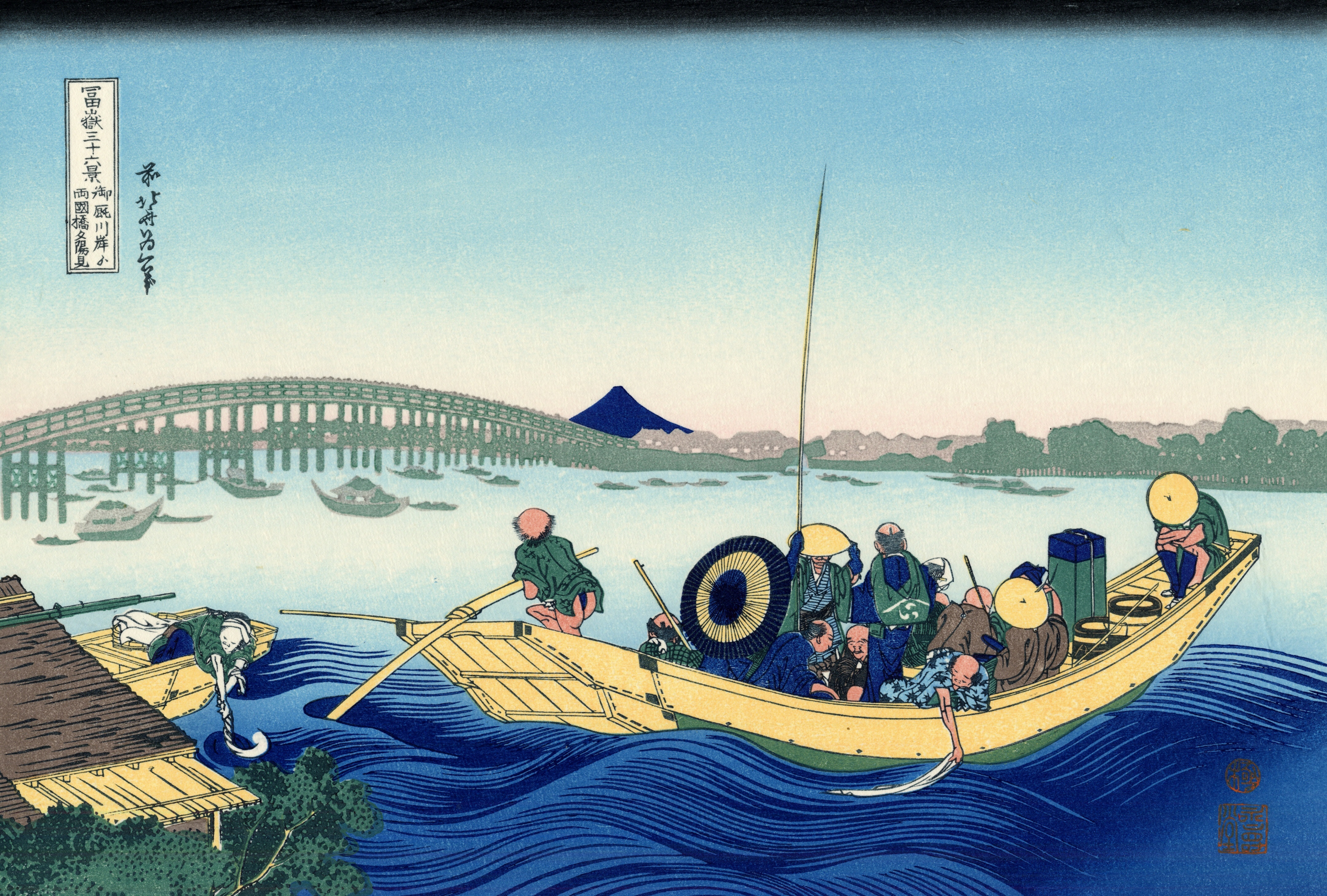
Katsushika Hokusai published this view of the Ryōgoku Bridge as an ukiyo-e print.

== See also ==
- List of Emperors of Japan
- Emperor of Japan

Preceded by Meireki (明暦)	Era or nengō Manji (万治); 1658–1661	Succeeded by Kanbun (寛文)
