= Jōō (Edo period) =

Period of Japanese history (1652–1655)

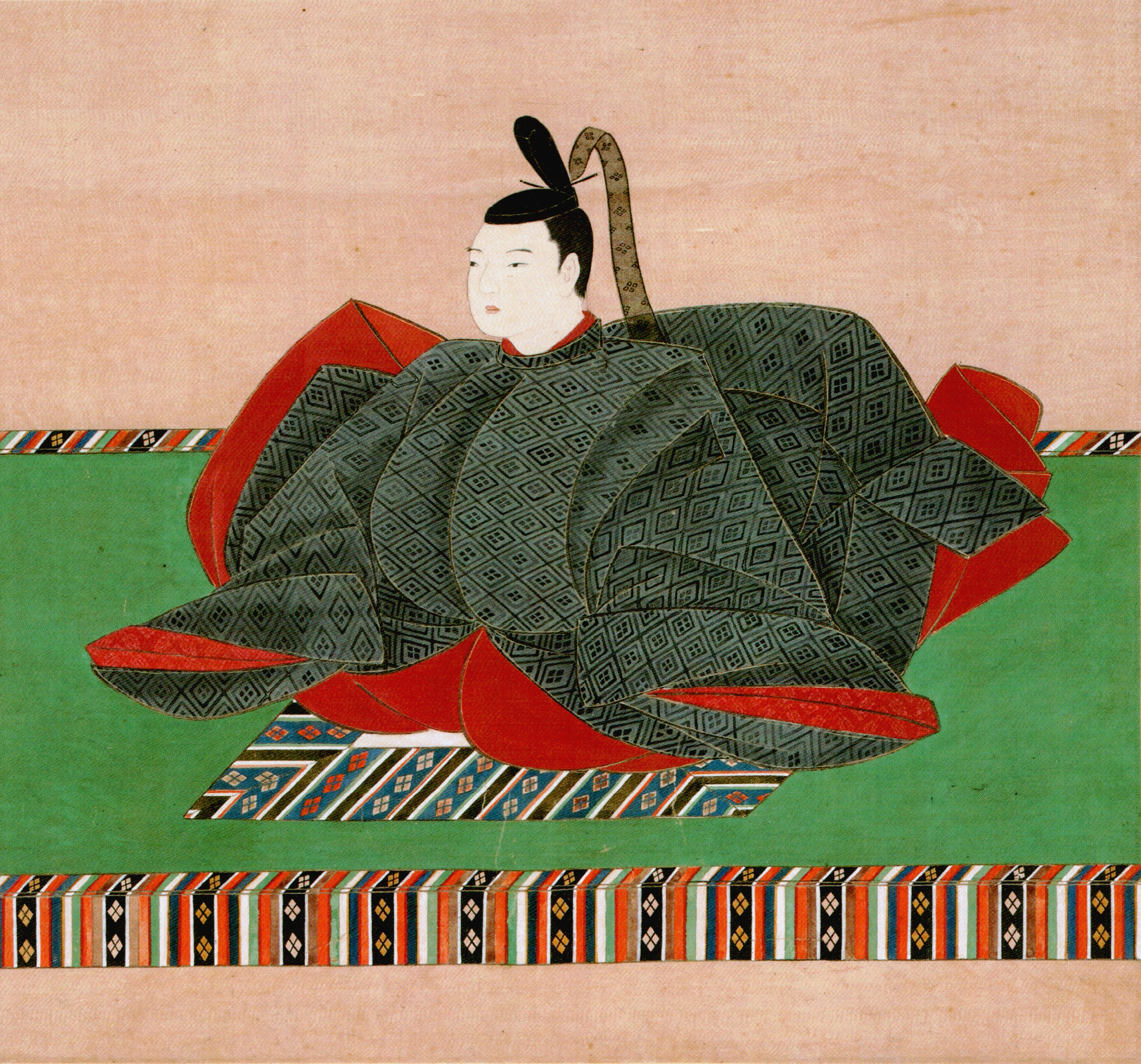
Emperor Go-Kōmyō, reigning emperor during Jōō

Jōō (承応), alternatively romanized as Jō-ō or Shōō, was a Japanese era name (年号, nengō; "year name") after Keian and before Meireki. This period spanned the years from September 1652 through April 1655. The reigning emperors were Go-Kōmyō-tennō (後光明天皇) and Go-Sai-tennō (後西天皇).

== Change of era ==
- 1652 Jōō gannen (承応元年): The era name was changed to Jōō (meaning "receiving answers"), which was to mark the death of the third shōgun, Tokugawa Iemitsu. The previous era ended and a new one commenced in Keian 5, on the 18th day of the 9th month.

The name of this new era came from the Book of the Jin: "The Xia and the Shang dynasties follow their destinies, so the House of Zhou came when it was time." (夏商承運、周氏応期)

== Events of the Jōō era ==
- October 3, 1653 (Jōō 2, 12th day of the 8th month): A violent fire destroyed a large part of the Imperial palace and many temples which were nearby. Shortly thereafter, several girls, aged 12–14 years, were imprisoned for having started this fire and others in Heian-kyō.
- August 18, 1654 (Jōō 3, 6th day of the 7th month): A famous priest, Ingen, arrived at Nagasaki from China. His intention was to reform the practice of Buddhism in Japan.
- October 30, 1654 (Jōō 3, 20th day of the 9th month): Emperor Go-Kōmyō died of smallpox; and his funeral ceremonies were at Sennyū-ji (泉涌寺,, senyō-ji) on the 15th day of the 10th month.

== Sakoku: Before and after 1653 ==
Within the Jōō period, Japan was implementing the Sakoku policy which adopted by Tokugawa Bakumatsu. Sakoku (鎖国) means closed country in Japanese. Japan was adopting this policy from 1639 to 1868. There was barely any foreign trade from other countries, with exception to Chinese and Dutch merchant. Japanese residences were strictly monitored by the Government. People were not allowed to leave the country, with consequence of death penalty. Foreigners were in the same situation, anyone who attempted to enter Japan's territory would be killed by the soldiers right away. The entire country was dictated by Tokugawa government. The Sakoku policy was adopted by the ruler for preventing invaders, and keeping their national characteristics and national religion. This policy was banned after the Edo Period (1603–1868). The country was re-opened to the world in 1868.

== Notes ==
Preceded by Keian (慶安)	Era or nengō Jōō (承応); 1652–1655	Succeeded by Meireki (明暦)
