= Great Fire of Meireki =

1657 fire destroying Edo (now Tokyo)

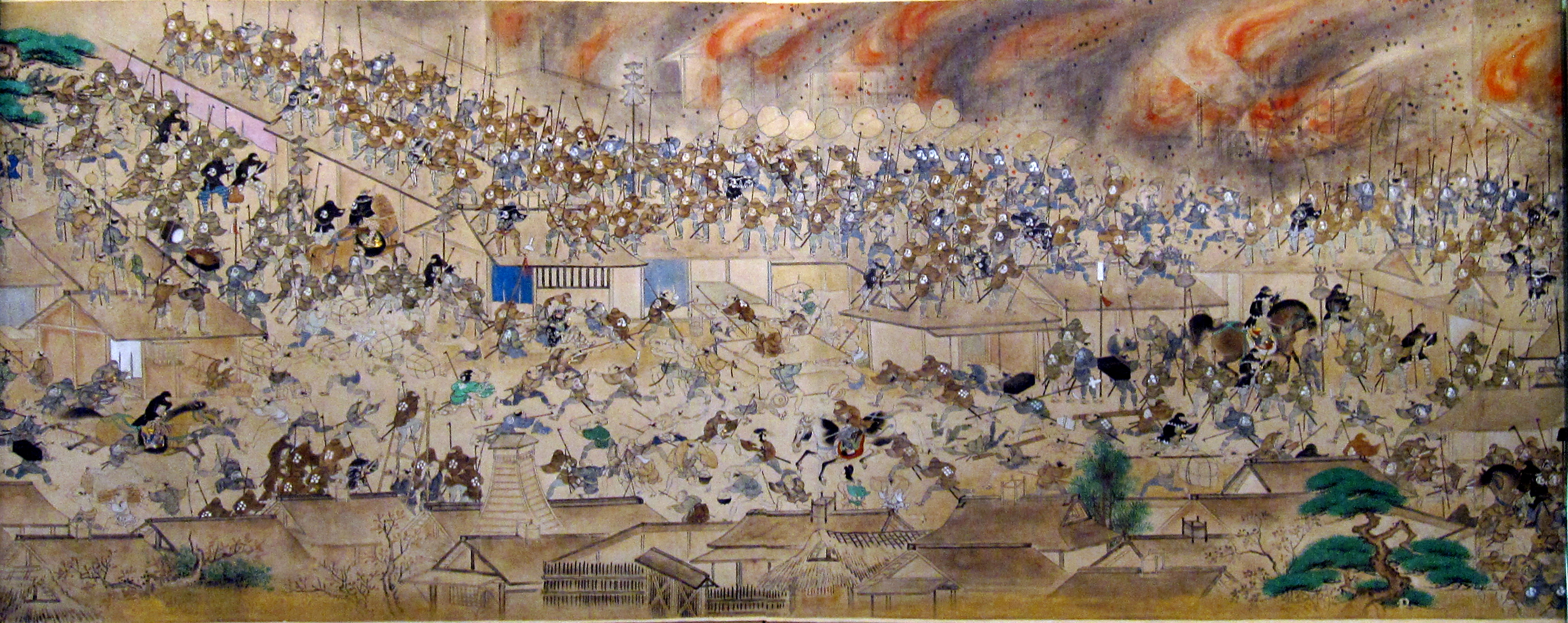
Handscroll depicting scenes from the Great Fire of Meireki (kept at the Edo-Tokyo Museum)

The Great Fire of Meireki (明暦の大火, Meireki no taika), also known as the Great Furisode Fire, destroyed 60–70% of Edo (now Tokyo), then de facto capital city of Japan, on 2 March 1657, the third year of the Meireki Era. The fire lasted for three days and, in combination with a severe blizzard that quickly followed, is estimated to have killed over 100,000 people.

== Legend ==
The fire was said to have been started accidentally by a priest who was cremating an allegedly cursed furisode kimono that had been owned in succession by three teenage girls who all died before ever being able to wear it. When the garment was being burned, a large gust of wind reportedly fanned the flames, causing the wooden temple to ignite.

== Historical account ==
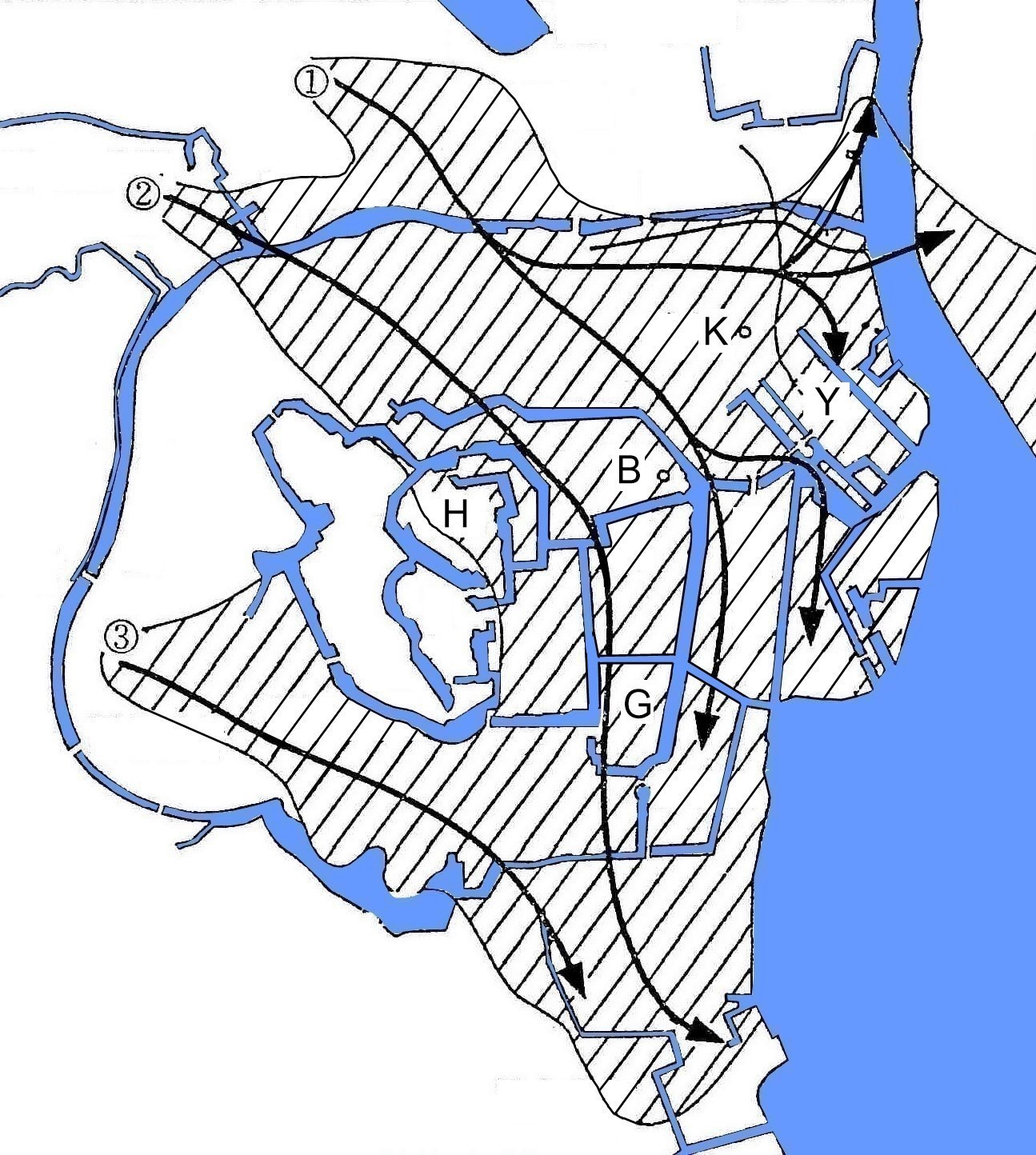
Fire's progression throughout the city, showing the initial March 2 fire at Honmyo-ji Temple (①), the fire at the gate of the Dentsu-in Temple (②), and the fire in Kōjimachi (③).

The fire began on the eighteenth day of the year, in Edo's Hongō district, and spread quickly through the city, due to hurricane-force winds that were blowing from the northwest. Edo, like all Japanese cities and towns at the time, was built primarily from wood and paper. The buildings were especially dry due to a drought the previous year, and the roads and other open spaces between buildings were small and narrow, allowing the fire to spread and grow particularly quickly. (Many cities in Europe had similar problems, being built of flammable material and tightly packed; the Great Fire of London nine years later was of similar magnitude.) Though Edo had designated fire brigades, the hikeshi, it had been established only 21 years earlier, and was simply not large enough, experienced enough, or well-equipped enough to face such a conflagration.

On the second evening, the winds changed, and the fire was pushed from the southern edges of the city back towards its center. The homes of the shōgun's closest retainers in Kōjimachi were destroyed as the fire made its way towards Edo castle, at the very center of the city. The main keep, most of the outer buildings and all of the retainers' and servants' homes were destroyed. Finally, on the third day, the winds died down, as did the flames, but thick smoke prevented movement about the city, removal of bodies, and reconstruction for several more days.

== Aftermath ==
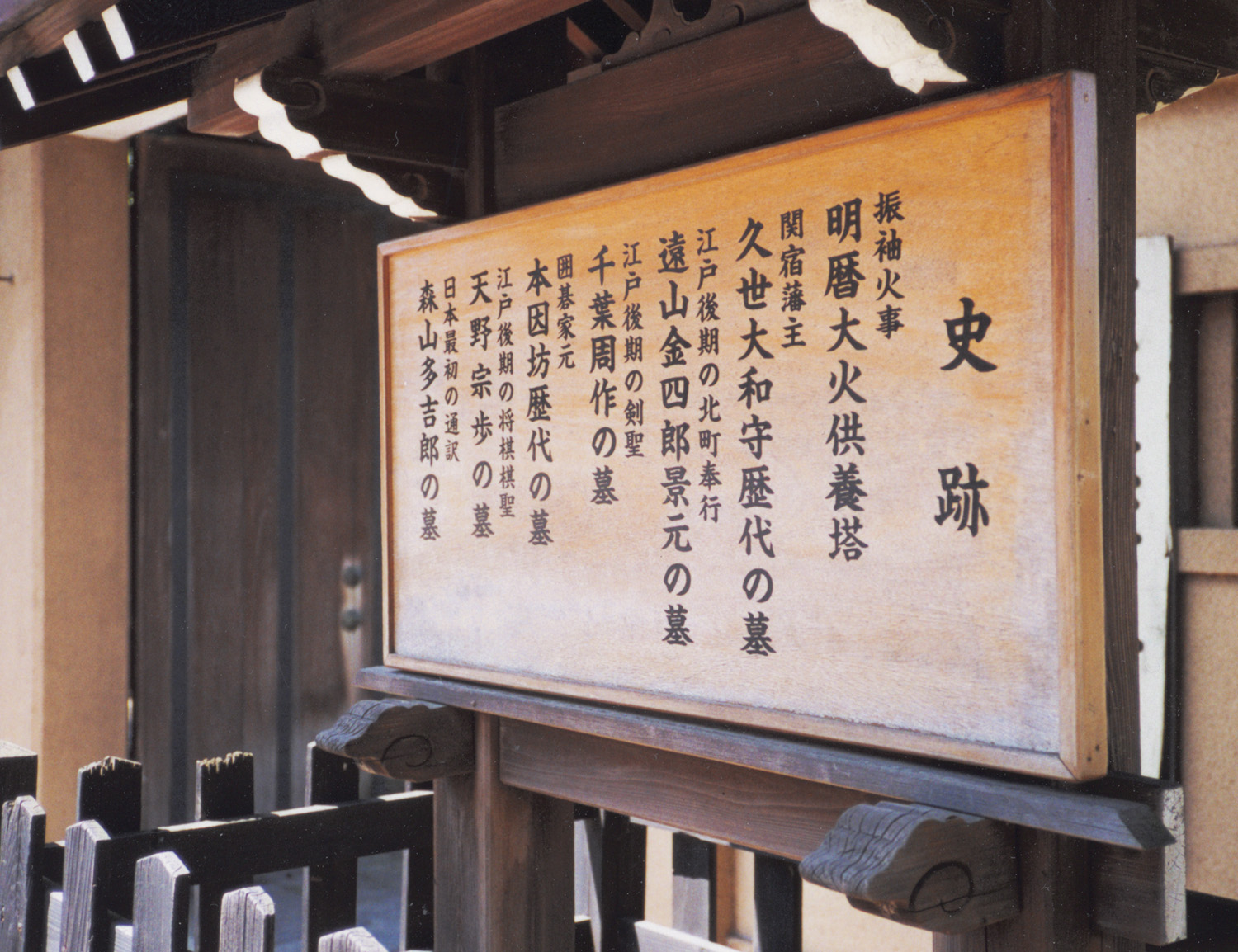
Historical marker for a memorial to victims of the fire

The shogunate's relief efforts were swift. After the fire was extinguished, 900 tons of rice and 160,000 ryo were immediately provided. The amount was so enormous that there were even concerns within the shogunate about financial ruin. However, Hoshina Masayuki pushed forward with the relief efforts. His words remain: "The shogunate's savings are meant to be used in times like these to reassure the people. If we don't use them now, it's as if we have no savings at all."

On the 24th day of the new year, six days after the fire began, monks and others began to transport the bodies of the dead down the Sumida River to Honjo, Sumida, a community on the eastern side of the river. There, pits were dug and the bodies buried; the Ekō-in (Hall of Prayer for the Dead) was then built on the site.

Reconstruction efforts took two years, as the shogunate took the opportunity to reorganize the city according to various practical considerations. Under the guidance of Rōjū Matsudaira Nobutsuna, streets were widened and some districts replanned and reorganized; special care was taken to restore Edo's mercantile center, thus protecting and boosting to some extent the overall national economy. Commoners and samurai retainers alike were granted funds from the government for the rebuilding of their homes, and the restoration of the shōgun's castle was left to be completed last. The area around the castle was reorganized to leave greater spaces to act as firebreaks; retainers' homes were moved further from the castle, and a number of temples and shrines were relocated to the banks of the river.

One of the greatest disasters in Japanese history, the death and destruction caused by the Meireki fire was nearly comparable to that suffered in the 1923 Great Kantō earthquake and the 1945 bombing of Tokyo in World War II. Both these 20th-century events, like the Meireki fire less than three centuries earlier, saw roughly 100,000 deaths, and destruction of the majority of the city.

== In popular culture ==
- The fire is referenced in the final episode of the first season of Netflix's Blue Eye Samurai (2023). In this fictional setting, the fire is caused by Mizu, the main protagonist.

== See also ==
- Fires in Edo
- Great Ryōgoku Fire

== Sources ==
- Sansom, George (1963). A History of Japan, 1615–1867. Stanford Univ Press. ISBN 978-0-8047-0526-4 – via Internet Archive.
