= Great Ryōgoku Fire =

1881 fire in Tokyo, Japan

The Great Ryōgoku Fire, or Great Kanda Fire, occurred on 26 January 1881, in Tokyo, Japan. The fire was the largest and most destructive of the Meiji era.

At about 2 a.m., two fires broke out simultaneously on the path along the Kanda River. Due to strong seasonal winds, the fire spread and was carried throughout Tokyo by the Ryōgoku Bridge. The fire destroyed 15,221 homes across over 100 acres, including much of the Edo period architecture. Over 36,000 people were left homeless.

On 11 February 1881, another major fire broke out in Hisamatsuchō.

== Depictions of the fire by Kiyochika ==
Kobayashi Kiyochika, an ukiyo-e artist of the period, made several sketches of the events. His home, studio, and birthplace were all destroyed in the Ryōgoku fire.

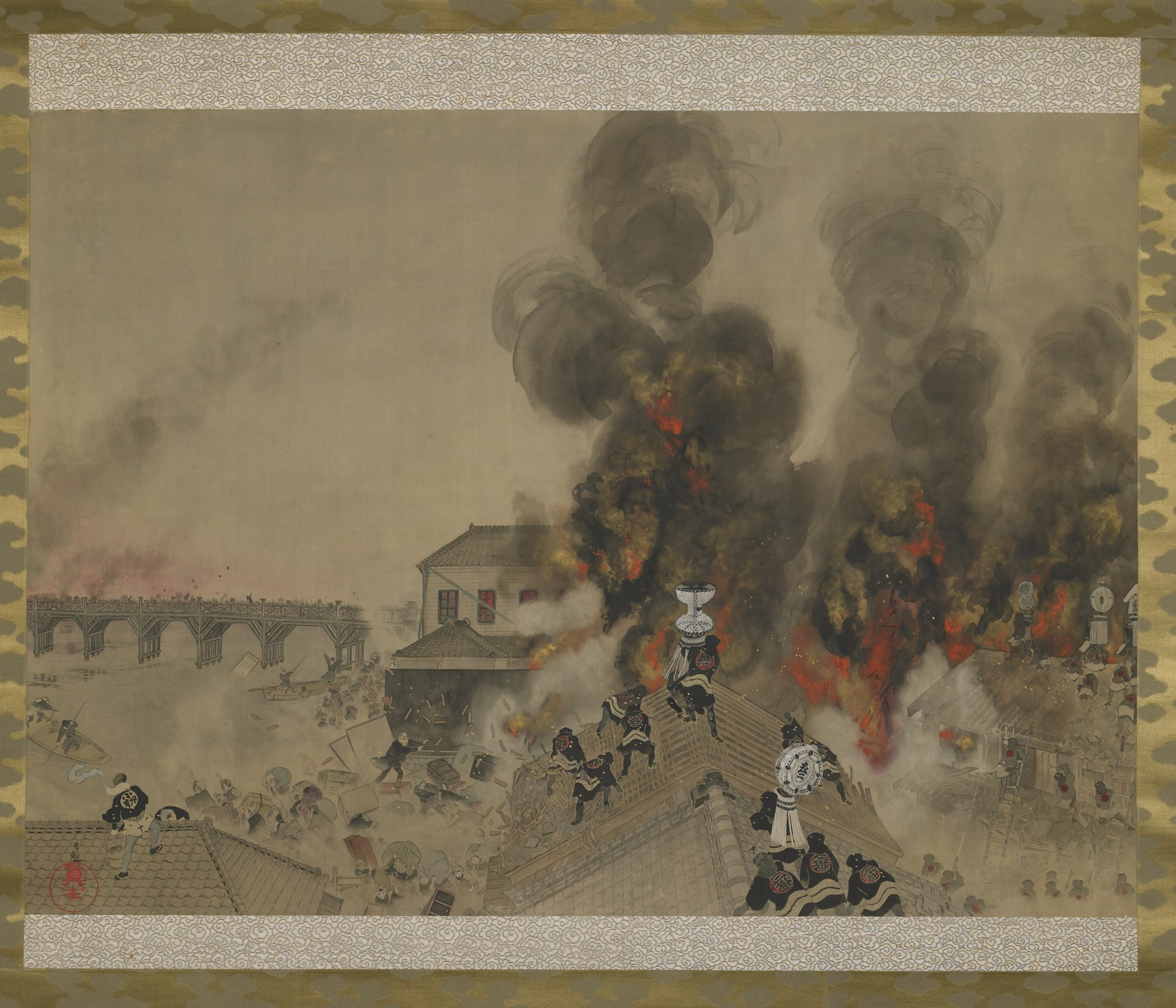
Firemen fighting the conflagration

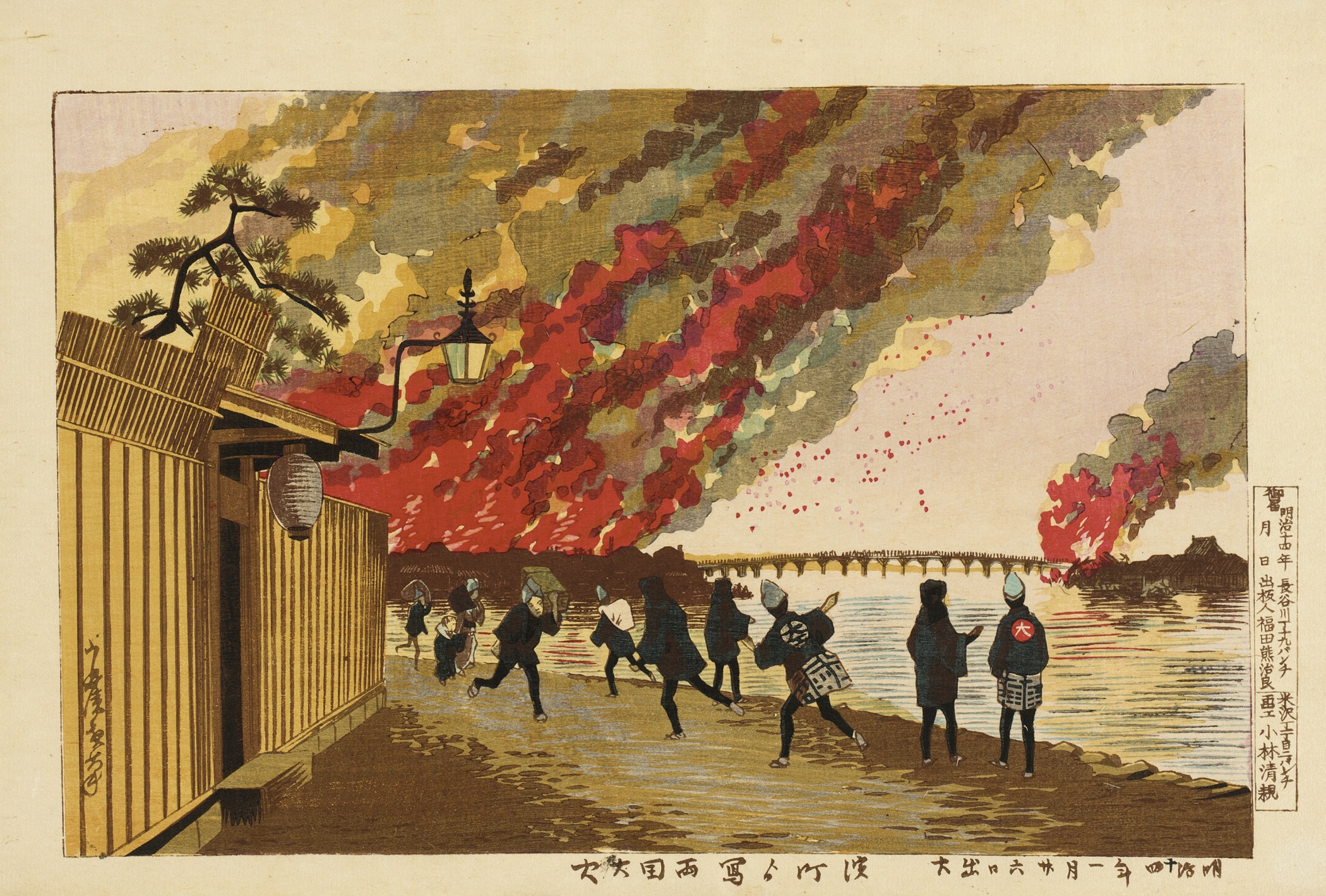
Sketched from Hamachō

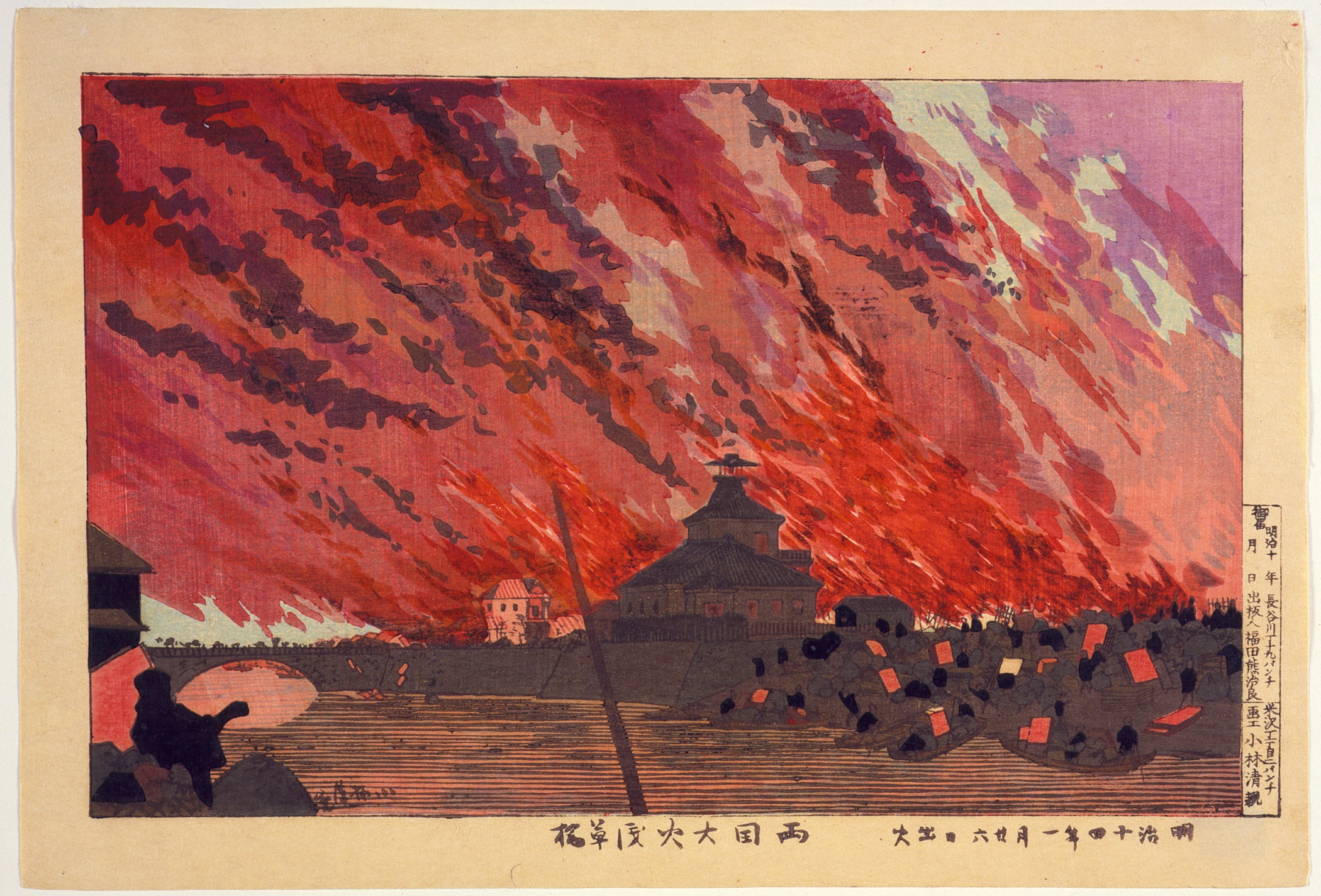
Sketched from the Asakusa Bridge

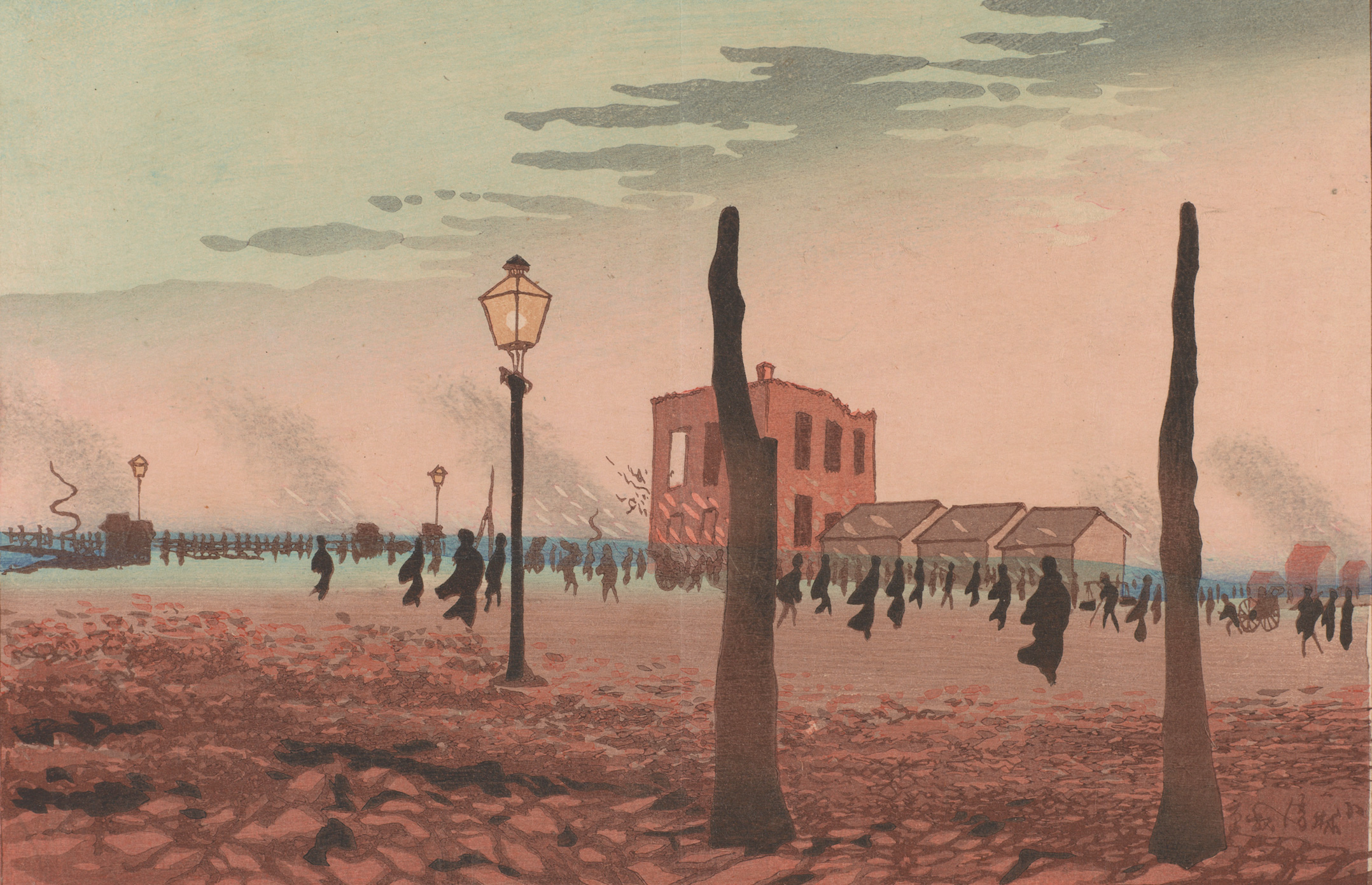
Aftermath

== See also ==
- Great Fire of Meireki
