= Meireki =

Period of Japanese history (April 1655 – July 1658)

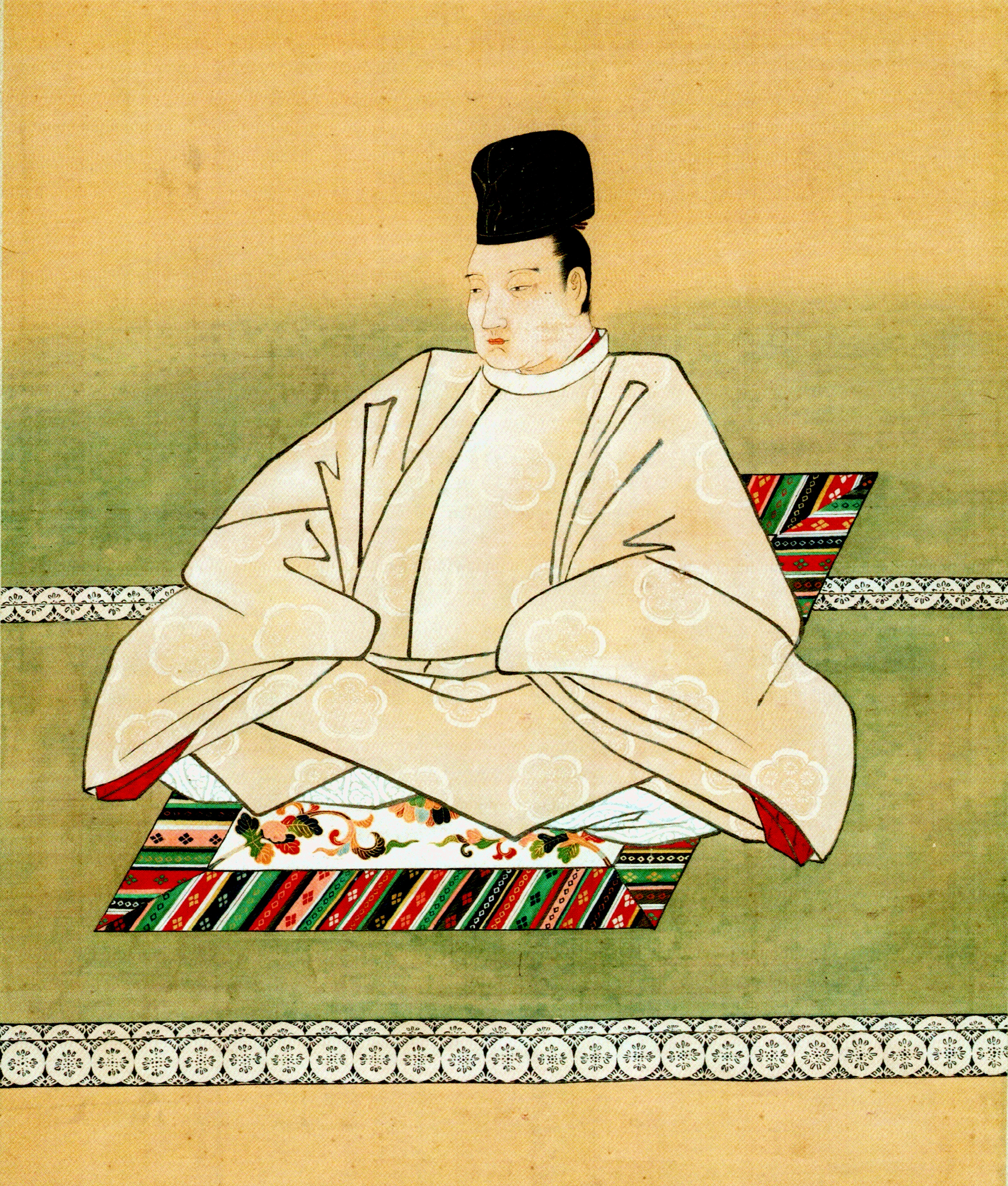
Emperor Go-Sai

Meireki (明暦) was a Japanese era name (年号, nengō; "year name") of the Edo period, after the Jōō era and before Manji era. This era's period spanned the years from April 1655 to July 1658.

The reigning emperor was Go-Sai-tennō (後西院天皇).

== Change of era ==
- 1655 Meireki gannen (明暦元年): The era name was changed to mark the enthronement of Emperor Go-Sai. The previous era ended and a new one commenced in Jōō 4, on the 13th day of the 4th month.

The source of the new era name was:

- From the Book of Han: "With the Nine Chapters of the Great Law, the five eras will be known" (大法九章、而五紀明歴法)
- From the Book of the Later Han: "The Yellow Emperor began the passing of time, so that is why the character 歴 [passing of time] and 暦 [rhythmic cycle] are used together" (黄帝造歴、歴与暦同作)

== Events of the Meireki era ==
- 1655 (Meireki 1): The new ambassador of Korea, arrived in Japan.
- 1655 (Meireki 1): The ex-Emperor went for the first time to Shugakuin Rikyū.
- March 2–3, 1657 (Meireki 3, 18th-19th days of the 1st month): The city of Edo was devastated by the Great Fire of Meireki.

== Notes ==
=== References ===
- Nussbaum, Louis Frédéric and Käthe Roth. (2005). Japan Encyclopedia. Cambridge: Harvard University Press. ISBN 978-0-674-01753-5; OCLC 48943301
- Ponsonby-Fane, Richard Arthur Brabazon. (1956). Kyoto: The Old Capital of Japan, 794–1869. Kyoto: Ponsonby Memorial Society. OCLC 182637732
- Screech, Timon. (2006). Secret Memoirs of the Shoguns: Isaac Titsingh and Japan, 1779-1822. London: RoutledgeCurzon. ISBN 978-0-203-09985-8; OCLC 65177072
- Titsingh, Isaac. (1834). Nihon Ōdai Ichiran; ou, Annales des empereurs du Japon. Paris: Royal Asiatic Society, Oriental Translation Fund of Great Britain and Ireland. OCLC 5850691

Preceded by Jōō (承応)	Era or nengō Meireki (明暦); 1655–1658	Succeeded by Manji (万治)
