= 1662 Kanbun earthquake =

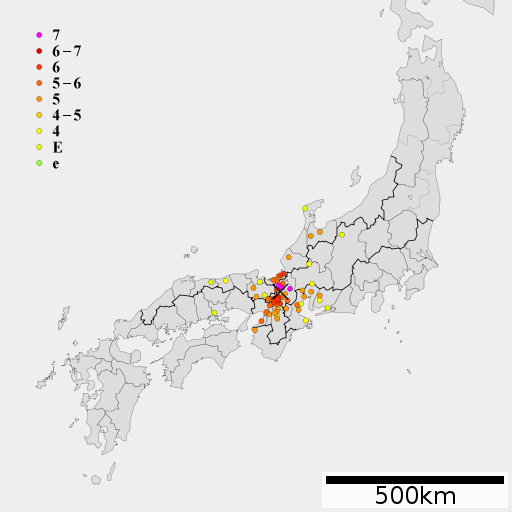
- Local date: June 16, 1662
- Magnitude: M7.25～7.6
- Epicenter: 35.2°N 135.95°E
- Total damage: 700–900 fatalities

The 1662 Kanbun earthquake (Japanese: 寛文地震) affected Japan on June 16, 1662. The magnitude was M7.6. Strong shaking were felt over a wide area, mainly in the Northern Kinki region (Around Lake Biwa), and damage was particularly severe in Ōmi and Wakasa. There was also great damage in Kyoto. The earthquake killed 700–900 people and destroyed 4000–4800 houses. This earthquake caused crustal deformation; east of Lake Suigetsu land rose 4.5 m (15 ft)).
