= Yonekura =

Yonekura (written: 米倉) is a Japanese surname. Notable people with the surname include:

- Chihiro Yonekura (米倉 千尋, born 1972), Japanese singer-songwriter
- Hiromasa Yonekura (米倉 弘昌, born 1937), Japanese businessman
- Hoji Yonekura (米倉 宝二, born 1944), Japanese boxer
- Kanako Yonekura (米倉 加奈子, born 1976), Japanese badminton player
- Kenji Yonekura (米倉 健司, 1934–2023), Japanese boxer
- Koki Yonekura (米倉 恒貴, born 1988), Japanese footballer
- Makoto Yonekura (米倉 誠, born 1970), Japanese footballer
- Yonekura Masaharu (米倉 昌晴, 1728–1786), Japanese daimyō
- Masakane Yonekura (米倉 斉加年, c. 1934 – 2014), Japanese actor
- Yonekura Masakata (米倉 昌賢, 1758–1798), Japanese daimyō
- Yonekura Masakoto (米倉 昌言, 1837–1909), Japanese daimyō
- Yonekura Masanaga (米倉 昌寿, 1793–1863), Japanese daimyō
- Yonekura Masanori (米倉 昌俊, 1784–1812), Japanese daimyō
- Yonekura Masayoshi (米倉 昌由, 1777–1817), Japanese daimyō
- Yonekura Satonori (米倉 里矩, 1733–1749), Japanese daimyō
- Yonekura Tadasuke (米倉 忠仰, 1706–1736), Japanese daimyō
- Ryoko Yonekura (米倉 涼子, born 1975), Japanese actress and model
- Teruyasu Yonekura (米倉 照恭, born 1971), Japanese pole vaulter
- Toshinori Yonekura (米倉 利紀, born 1972), Japanese singer-songwriter
- Yoshiko Yonekura (米倉 よし子), Japanese badminton player

== See also ==
- Yonekura clan, a Japanese clan
