= Yanagisawa clan =

Yanagisawa 柳沢
- Yanagisawa clan emblem
- Home province: Kai Province
- Parent house: Minamoto clan (Seiwa Genji); Takeda clan
- Titles: Various
- Founder: Yanagisawa Yoshiyasu
- Ruled until: 1871 (Abolition of the han system)

The Yanagisawa clan (柳沢氏, Yanagisawa-shi) was a Japanese samurai clan who rose to prominence under the Edo period Tokugawa shogunate. The main branch of the clan ruled as daimyō of Kōriyama Domain in Yamato Province (150,120 koku) until the Meiji restoration, and was subsequently granted the kazoku peerage title of hakushaku (count).

== Origins and Edo period history ==
The Yanagisawa were originally from Kai Province and descend from the Takeda clan through Ichijo Tokinobu, grandson of Takeda Nobunaga, a grandson of Takeda Nobuyoshi (1128-1186).

Yanagisawa Nobutoshi (1548-1614) was the son of Aoki Nobutaka, and member of the Mukawashu, a cadet branch of the Takeda clan descending from Ichijo Tokinobu, and a group of warriors who defended the border. At that time, the Aoki clan was in the position of the head of the Mukawashu. After the fall of the Takeda clan, the Yanagisawa together with other Mukawashu were recruited by Tokugawa Ieyasu, who protected several surviving retainers of the Takeda clan, such as the Yonekura clan and the Tsuchiya clan. On August 16, 1582, Ieyasu granted him 72 kan 800 mon (equivalent to approximately 300 koku) of land in Kai province. In 1590, when Ieyasu was transferred to Kanto, Nobutoshi received 230 koku in the Hachigata territory of Musashi Province.

Yanagisawa Yasuyoshi (1595-1686), his son, was a Hatamoto, a direct retainer of Tokugawa Hidetada and later Tokugawa Ietsuna, increasing his income to 430 koku, whereas his younger brother Yanagisawa Yasutada (1602-1687) went into the service of Tokugawa Tsunayoshi of Tatebayashi Domain.

Yanagisawa Yoshiyasu (1659-1714), son of Yasutada, inherited the family stipend of 530 koku in 1675 when his father retired. In 1680, when Tokugawa Tsunayoshi became the 5th Shogun, Yoshiyasu became the direct retainer of the Shogun. In 1688, he was appointed Sobayonin (Lord Chamberlain) and was promoted to Daimyo of Sanuki Domain (12,000 koku) in Kazusa province. In 1690, he was given an additional 20,000 koku. In 1694, he was appointed as Rōjū and transferred to Kawagoe Domain (82,000 koku). In 1704, when Tokugawa Tsunatoyo from Kōfu Domain was chosen as Tsunayoshi's heir, Yoshiyasu was transferred to Kōfu Domain (150,000 koku). From April 10 to April 12 of the same year, at the memorial service for the 133rd anniversary of the death of Takeda Shingen at Kai Erin-ji Temple, Yoshiyasu emphasized that he was a member of the Takeda family. In 1706, he was promoted to the rank of Tairō.

His son, Yanagisawa Yoshisato, was transferred in 1724 to Kōriyama Domain, which his descendants held until the abolition of the han system in 1871. The final daimyō of Kōriyama, Yanagisawa Yasunobu, received the kazoku peerage title of hakushaku (Count).

== Cadet branches ==
- A branch of the clan descended from Yanagisawa Tsunetaka, the 4th son of Yanagisawa Yoshiyasu was granted the 10,000 koku holding of Kurokawa Domain (today part of Tainai, Niigata), from 1723 to 1868, and subsequently received the title of viscount.
- A branch of the clan descended from Yanagisawa Tokichika, the 5th son of Yanagisawa Yoshiyasu was granted the 10,000 koku holding of Mikkaichi Domain (today part of Shibata, Niigata), from 1723 to 1868, and subsequently received the title of viscount.
