= Kurokawa Domain =

Fudai feudal domain under the Tokugawa shogunate

Kurokawa Domain 黒川藩
- under Tokugawa shogunate Japan
- 1724–1871
- Capital: Kurokawa jin'ya
- Area
  - Coordinates: 38°04′37″N 139°26′15″E
  - Type: Daimyō
- Historical era: Edo period
  - Established: 1724
  - Disestablished: 1871
- Today part of: Niigata Prefecture

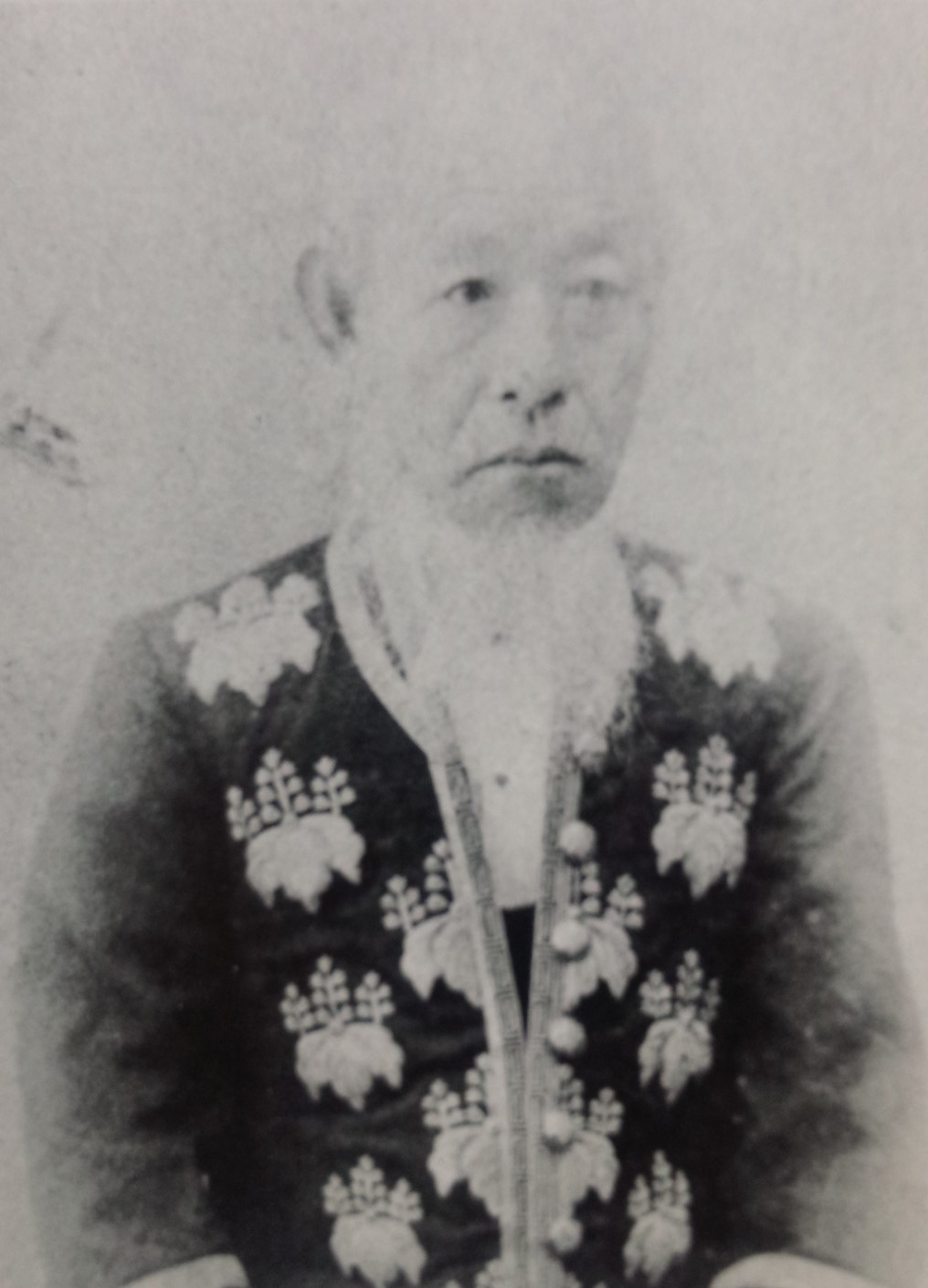
Yanagisawa Mitsuteru, the next-to-last daimyō of Kurokawa

Kurokawa Domain (黒川藩, Kurokawa-han) was a fudai feudal domain under the Tokugawa shogunate of Edo period Japan. It is located in Echigo Province, Honshū. The domain was centered at Kurokawa Jin'ya, located in what is now part of the city of Tainai in Niigata Prefecture.

== History ==
In 1724, the tairō Yanagisawa Yoshiyasu arranged for a 10,000 koku holding in Echigo Province to be assigned to his 4th son, Yanagisawa Tsunetaka. This marked the start of Kurosawa Domain. Although the Yanagisawa clan remained in control until the Meiji restoration, they preferred to reside in Edo and rely on the collection of revenues as absentee landlords. The finances of the domain were perpetually in a state of bankruptcy, partly caused by the fact that much of the domain was mountains and forests and unsuitable for rice farming. The actual revenues of the domain often fell short of 10,000 koku and the domain was forced to resort to frequent loans from the parent house of the Yanagisawa clan in Yamato-Kōriyama for financial assistance. By 1843, the domain was over 5000 ryō in debt. The 7th daimyō, Yanagisawa Mitsuteru, was the first daimyō to actually visit the domain. He established a Han school and joined the Ōuetsu Reppan Dōmei during the Boshin War. However, the domain was too small and too weak to provide any meaningful military support.

In July 1871, with the abolition of the han system, Kurokawa Domain briefly became Kurokawa Prefecture, and was merged into the newly created Niigata Prefecture. Under the new Meiji government, Yanagisawa Mitsukuni was given the kazoku peerage title of shishaku (viscount), and later served as a member of the House of Peers

== Bakumatsu period holdings ==
As with most domains in the han system, Kurokawa Domain consisted of several discontinuous territories calculated to provide the assigned kokudaka, based on periodic cadastral surveys and projected agricultural yields.

- Echigo Province
  - 43 villages in Kanbara District

== List of daimyō ==
#	Name	Tenure	Courtesy title	Court Rank	kokudaka	Notes
Yanagisawa clan (fudai) 1724-1868
1	Yanagisawa Tsunetaka (柳沢経隆)	1724-1725	Gyōbu-shōyū (刑部少輔)	Junior 5th Rank, Lower Grade (従五位上)	10,000 koku	
2	Yanagisawa Satozumi (柳沢里済)	1725-1735	Gyōbu-shōyū (刑部少輔)	Junior 5th Rank, Lower Grade (従五位上)	10,000 koku	
3	Yanagisawa Satoakira (柳沢里旭)	1735-1736	-none-	-none-	10,000 koku	
4	Yanagisawa Yasutaka (柳沢保卓)	1736-1774	Minbu-no-shō (民部少輔)	Junior 5th Rank, Lower Grade (従五位上)	10,000 koku	
5	Yanagisawa Nobutō (柳沢信有)	1774-1797	Ise-no-kami (伊勢守)	Junior 5th Rank, Lower Grade (従五位上)	10,000 koku	
6	Yanagisawa Mitsuhi (柳沢光被)	1797-1836	Ise-no-kami (伊勢守)	Junior 5th Rank, Lower Grade (従五位上)	10,000 koku	
7	Yanagisawa Mitsuteru (柳沢光昭)	1836-1868	Ise-no-kami (伊勢守)	Junior 5th Rank, Lower Grade (従五位上)	10,000 koku	
8	Yanagisawa Mitsukuni (柳沢光邦)	1868-1871	Gyōbu-shōyū (刑部少輔)	Junior 5th Rank, Lower Grade (従五位上)	10,000 koku	

=== Yanagisawa Tsunetaka ===
Yanagisawa Tsunetaka (柳沢経隆; January 1, 1695 – September 29, 1725) was the 1st daimyō of Kurokawa Domain. He was the fourth son of the famous Yanagisawa Yoshiyasu and was born in Kandabashi, Edo. He was received in audience by Shōgun Tokugawa Tsunayoshi as an infant, and was permitted to take the "Matsudaira" name as an honor in 1701. In 1709, he received a fief of 10,000 koku from his father's lands in Kōfu Domain, and in 1710 underwent the genpuku ceremony. In 1724, his estates were transferred from Kōfu to Echigo Province, and he became daimyō of Kurokawa; however, he died only four months later at the age of 32. He was married to a daughter of the Dainagon Ogimachi Sanetoyo, but had no heir. His grave is at the temple of Gekkei-ji in Shinjuku, Tokyo.

=== Yanagisawa Satozumi ===
Yanagisawa Satozumi (柳沢里済; 1709 – December 15, 1735) was the 2nd daimyō of Kurokawa Domain. He was the fifth son of Yanagisawa Yoshikiyo, a samurai of Yamato-Kōriyama Domain, and was adopted posthumously to succeed the childless Tsunetaka. He served as Osaka kaban and Nikkō Bugyō, but died in 1735 at the clan's Magome residence in Edo without heir.

=== Yanagisawa Satoakira ===
Yanagisawa Satoakira (柳沢里旭; July 10, 1722 – July 11, 1736) was the 3rd daimyō of Kurokawa Domain. He was the eldest son of Yanagisawa Satomitsu, a samurai of Yamato-Kōriyama Domain, and the nephew of Satozumi, and was adopted posthumously to succeed the latter on his unexpected death. However, he died immediately after an interview with the Shogun's metsuke inspectors, without heir.

=== Yanagisawa Yasutaka ===
Yanagisawa Yasutaka (柳沢保卓; June 16, 1727 – May 2, 1774) was the 4th daimyō of Kurokawa Domain. He was the second son of Yanagisawa Satomitsu, a samurai of Yamato-Kōriyama Domain, and the younger brother of Satoakira. He served an Ōbangashira in 1747. He was married to a daughter of Hosokawa Okinari, of Uto Domain. a subsidiary of Kumamoto Domain, and later married a daughter of Uemura Ieyuki of Takatori Domain. He died in 1774 and was succeeded by his eldest son.

=== Yanagisawa Nobutō ===
Yanagisawa Nobutō (柳沢信有; April 7, 1752 – April 9, 1797) was the 5th daimyō of Kurokawa Domain. He was the eldest son of Yanagisawa Yoshitaka, and became daimyō on the death of his father in 1774. He was married to a daughter of Yanagisawa Yoshisato, of Yamato-Kōriyama Domain, and later married a daughter of Abe Masayoshi of Fukuyama Domain. He died in 1797 and was succeeded by his eldest son.

=== Yanagisawa Mitsuhi ===
Yanagisawa Mitsuhi (柳沢光被; August 27, 1784 – November 2, 1836) was the 6th daimyō of Kurokawa Domain. He was the eldest son of Yanagisawa Nobutō, and became daimyō on the death of his father in 1797. He was received in formal audience by Shōgun Tokugawa Ienari the same year. he served as Osaka kaban in 1802 and 1823 and as Nikkō Bugyō in 1806, 1821 and 1828. He was married to a daughter of Toda Masachika, of Shinjō Domain, and later married a daughter of Yanagisawa Yasumitsu of Yamato-Kōriyama Domain. He died in 1836 without male heir.

=== Yanagisawa Mitsuteru ===
Yanagisawa Mitsuteru (柳沢光昭; July 21, 1823 – April 4, 1900) was the 7th daimyō of Kurokawa Domain. He was the tenth son of Yanagisawa Yasuhiro of Yamato-Kōriyama Domain and was posthumously adopted to succeed Yanagasawa Mitsugi in 1836. He was the first of the daimyō of Kurokawa to actually visit the domain. During the Bakumatsu period he established a han school. In 1863, he was appointed a sōshaban and in 1864 to the newly created title of Gakumon-Bugyō. He led the domain into the Ōuetsu Reppan Dōmei during the Boshin War, but was only lukewarm in support. In 1868, he resigned his offices in favor his adopted son, and lived in Tokyo to his death in 1900.

=== Yanagisawa Mitsukuni ===
Yanagisawa Mitsukuni (柳沢光邦; April 22, 1854 – October 22, 1923) was the 8th (and final) daimyō of Kurokawa Domain. He was the sixth son of Takeda Nobuyuki, a hatamoto descendant of the Takeda clan. He was adopted as heir to Yanagisawa Mitsuteru in 1862 and received in formal audience by Shōgun Tokugawa Yoshinobu in 1867. He became daimyō on the retirement of his father in 1868. In 1869, the new Meiji government appointed him imperial governor of Kurokawa, which he held to the abolition of the han system in 1871. In 1879, he entered the Ministry of the Treasury. He 1884, he was ennobled with the kazoku title of shishaku (viscount). From 1890 to 1897, he served as a member of the House of Peers. On his death in 1923, the title of viscount passed to Yanagisawa Mitsuharu (1891-1957).

== See also ==
List of Han
