= Mikkaichi Domain =

Fudai feudal domain under the Tokugawa shogunate

Mikkaichi Domain 三日市藩
- under Tokugawa shogunate Japan
- 1724–1871
- Capital: Mikkaichi jin'ya
- Area
  - Coordinates: 38°58′19.64″N 139°21′47.74″E
  - Type: Daimyō
- Historical era: Edo period
  - Established: 1724
  - Disestablished: 1871
- Today part of: part of Niigata Prefecture

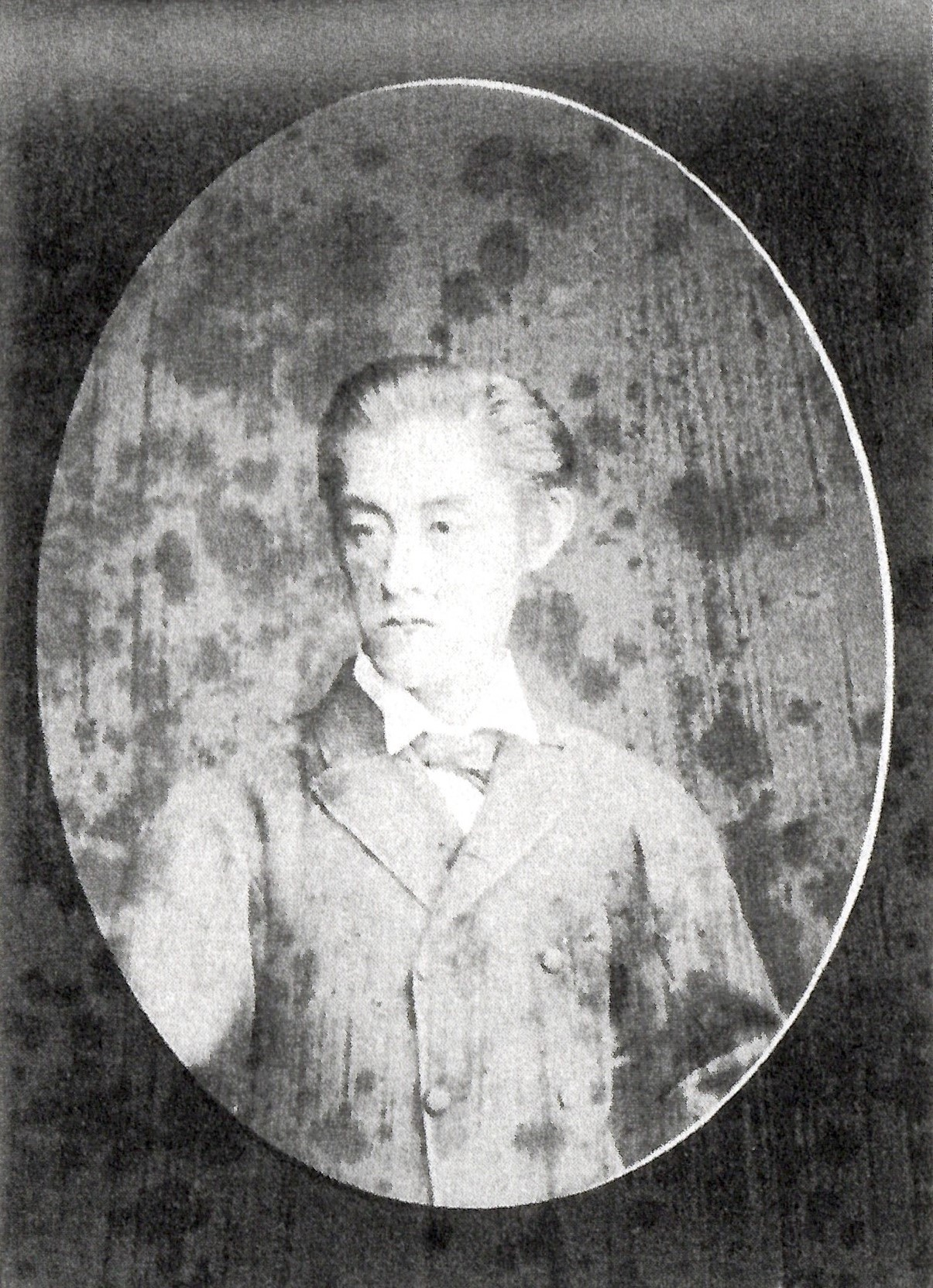
Yanagisawa Noritada, the last daimyō of Mikkaichi

Mikkaichi Domain (三日市藩, Mikkaichi-han) was a fudai feudal domain under the Tokugawa shogunate of Edo period Japan. It is located in Echigo Province, Honshū. The domain was centered at Mikkaichi Jin'ya, located in what is now part of the city of Shibata in Niigata Prefecture. The Shibata City Nanaha Middle School now occupies the site.

== History ==
In 1724, the tairō Yanagisawa Yoshiyasu arranged for a 10,000 koku holding in Echigo Province to be assigned to his 5th son, Yanagisawa Tokichika. This marked the start of Mikkaichi Domain. Tochichika turned the domain over to his brother after only three months, and although the Yanagisawa clan remained in control until the Meiji restoration, they preferred to reside in Edo and rely on the collection of revenues as absentee landlords. As a result, the finances of the domain were perpetually in a state of bankruptcy, and belated efforts to remedy the situation through reforms in 1843 failed. During the Bakumatsu period, the domain was unable to fulfil orders to provide troops for coastal defences, and its Edo residence was destroyed in the 1855 Edo earthquake. The final daimyō of Mikkaichi, Yanagisawa Noritada, was the only daimyō to actually visit his domain, and did so only to surrender his forces to neighbouring Shibata Domain during the Boshin War. In July 1871, with the abolition of the han system, Mikkaichi Domain briefly became Mikkaichi Prefecture, and was merged into the newly created Niigata Prefecture. Under the new Meiji government, Yanagisawa Noritada was given the kazoku peerage title of shishaku (viscount).

== Bakumatsu period holdings ==
As with most domains in the han system, Mikkaichi Domain consisted of several discontinuous territories calculated to provide the assigned kokudaka, based on periodic cadastral surveys and projected agricultural yields.

- Echigo Province
  - 49 villages in Kanbara District

== List of daimyō ==
#	Name	Tenure	Courtesy title	Court Rank	kokudaka	Notes
Yanagisawa clan (fudai) 1724–1868
1	Yanagisawa Tokichika (柳沢時睦)	1724-1724	Shikibu-no-shō (式部少輔)	Junior 5th Rank, Lower Grade (従五位上)	10,000 koku	
2	Yanagisawa Yasutsune (柳沢保経)	1724-1760	Danjō-shohitsu (弾正少弼)	Junior 5th Rank, Lower Grade (従五位上)	10,000 koku	
3	Yanagisawa Nobuaki (柳沢信著)	1760-1782	Shikibu-no-shō (式部少輔	Junior 5th Rank, Lower Grade (従五位上)	10,000 koku	
4	Yanagisawa Satoyuki (柳沢里之)	1782-1804	Shinano-no-kami (信濃守)	Junior 5th Rank, Lower Grade (従五位上)	10,000 koku	
5	Yanagisawa Satoyo (柳沢里世)	1804-1826	Shinano-no-kami (信濃守)	Junior 5th Rank, Lower Grade (従五位上)	10,000 koku	
6	Yanagisawa Satoaki (柳沢里顕)	1826-1842	Danjō-shohitsu (弾正少弼)	Junior 5th Rank, Lower Grade (従五位上)	10,000 koku	
7	Yanagisawa Yasutaka (柳沢泰孝)	1842-1856	Danjō-shohitsu (弾正少弼)	Junior 5th Rank, Lower Grade (従五位上)	10,000 koku	
8	Yanagisawa Noritada (柳沢徳忠)	1856-1868	Shinano-no-kami (信濃守)	Junior 5th Rank, Lower Grade (従五位上)	10,000 koku	

=== Yanagisawa Tokichika ===
Yanagisawa Tokichika (柳沢時睦, July 10, 1696 – May 29, 1750) was the fifth son of the famous Yanagisawa Yoshiyasu and was born in Edo. His mother was Ogimachi Machiko. He was received in audience by Shōgun Tokugawa Tsunayoshi at the age of five, and was permitted to take the "Matsudaira" name as an honor in 1701. In 1709, he received a fief of 10,000 koku from his father's lands in Kōfu Domain, becoming daimyō of Kōfu Shinden Domain. In 1724, his estates were transferred from Kōfu to Echigo Province, and he became daimyō of Mikkaichi; however, he turned his estate over to his younger brother and went into retirement shortly afterwards. He died in 1750.

=== Yanagisawa Yasutsune ===
Yanagisawa Yasutsune (柳沢保経, September 2, 1706 – July 18, 1760) was the seventh son of the famous Yanagisawa Yoshiyasu and became the 2nd daimyō of Mikkaichi on the retirement of his brother Tokichika in 1724. He served on guard of Edo Castle and as both Suruga kaban and Osaka kaban as well as Nikkō Bugyō. He died in 1760.

=== Yanagisawa Nobuaki ===
Yanagisawa Nobuaki (柳沢信著, December 12, 1747 – April 22, 1782) was 3rd daimyō of Mikkaichi. He was the eldest son of Yanagisawa Yasutsune and became daimyō on the death of his father in 1760. During his tenure, the clan reverted from using "Matsudaira" back to Yanagisawa" as their surname. He died without heir in 1783.

=== Yanagisawa Satoyuki ===
Yanagisawa Satoyuki (柳沢里之, February 20, 1758 – August 29, 1804) was 4th daimyō of Mikkaichi. He was the fifth son of Yanagisawa Nobutoki of Yamato-Kōriyama Domain and was adopted as posthumous heir to Yanagisawa Nobuaki. His wife was a daughter of Abe Nobuchika of Okabe Domain. He died in 1804 at the age of 47.

=== Yanagisawa Satoyo ===
Yanagisawa Satoyo (柳沢里世, December 5, 1789 – May 25, 1827) was 5th daimyō of Mikkaichi. He was the eldest son of Yanagisawa Satoyuki, and became daimyō on the death of his father in 1804. He was received in formal audience by Shogun Tokugawa Ienari in 1810. In 1812, he served as Osaka kaban and as Nikkō Bugyō in 1814. He retired from public life in 1826 and died the following year at the age of 38. His wife was a daughter of Itakura Katsumasa of Bitchū-Matsuyama Domain, but had no heir.

=== Yanagisawa Satoaki ===
Yanagisawa Satoaki (柳沢里顕, December 5, 1809 – January 24, 1843) was 6th daimyō of Mikkaichi. He was the ninth son of Yanagisawa Yasumitsu of Yamato-Kōriyama Domain, and married the daughter of Yanagisawa Satoyo. He was received in formal audience by Shogun Tokugawa Ienari in 1825, and became daimyō on the retirement of his father-in-law in 1826. By the time of his tenure, the domain was very deeply in debt and was forced to borrow 2000 ryō at very high rates of interest. He served as Nikkō Bugyō in 1828 and 1836, and as Osaka kaban in 1829. He died in 1843. His wife was a daughter of Hori Naoyasu of Muramatsu Domain.

=== Yanagisawa Yasutaka ===
Yanagisawa Yasutaka (柳沢泰孝, November 26, 1833 – March 18, 1856) was 7th daimyō of Mikkaichi. He was the eldest son of Yanagisawa Satoaki, and became daimyō on his father death in 1843. He was received in formal audience by Shogun Tokugawa Ieyoshi in 1847. He served as Nikkō Bugyō in 1852. He died in 1856 at the age of 22. and as Osaka kaban in 1829. He died in 1843.

=== Yanagisawa Noritada ===
Yanagisawa Noritada (柳沢徳忠, September 3, 1854 – January 15, 1936) was 7th daimyō of Mikkaichi. He was the eldest son of Yanagisawa Satoaki, and became daimyō on his father death in 1856. He departed Edo in 1868, becoming the first daimyō of Mikkaichi to actually visit his domain. With the start of the Boshin War, he quickly joined the imperial side and attached his forces to the army of Prince Komatsu Akihito. Under the Meiji government, he served as imperial governor until the abolition of the han system in 1871. He was subsequently ennobled with the kazoku peerage title of shishaku (viscount). He died in 1936.

== See also ==
List of Han
