= Tokugawa Ietsugu =

Military ruler of Japan from 1713 to 1716

Senior First Rank Tokugawa Ietsugu
- 徳川 家継
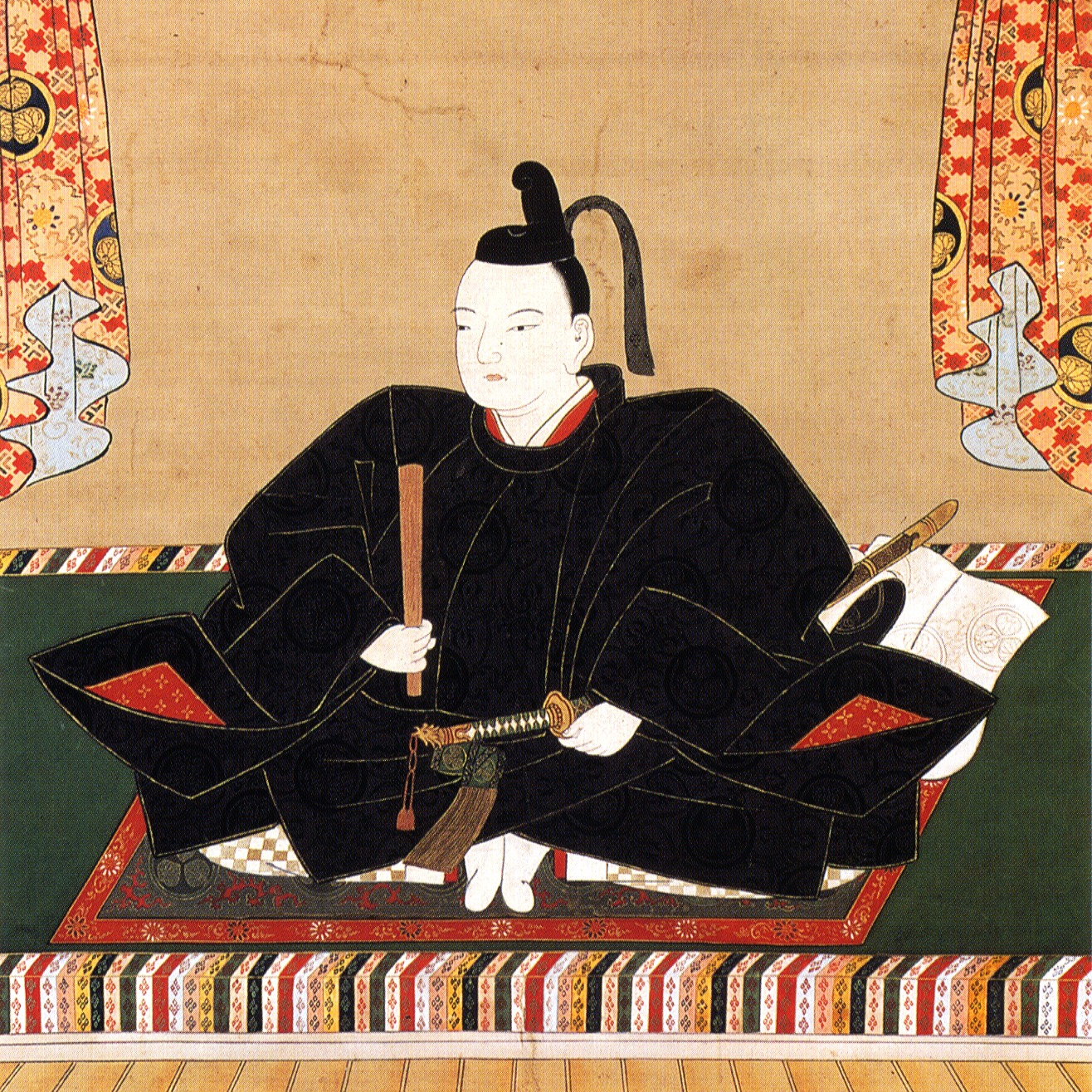

Shōgun
- In office 29 March 1713 – 19 June 1716
- Monarch: Nakamikado
- Preceded by: Tokugawa Ienobu
- Succeeded by: Tokugawa Yoshimune

Personal details
- Born: 8 August 1709 Edo, Tokugawa shogunate (now Tokyo, Japan)
- Died: 19 June 1716 (aged 6) Tokugawa shogunate
- Spouse: Yoshiko no Miya
- Parents: Tokugawa Ienobu; Gekkōin
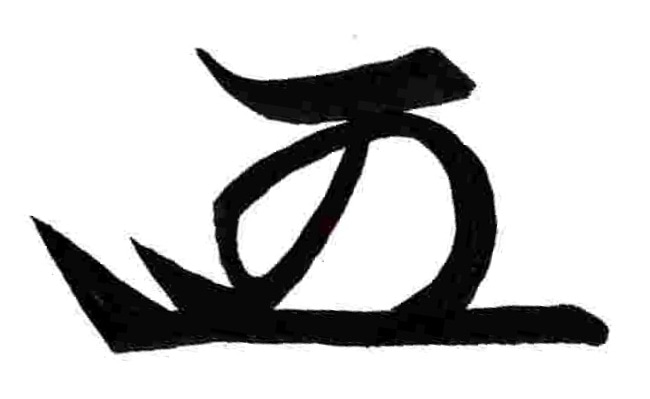
- Signature

Tokugawa Ietsugu (徳川 家継; 8 August 1709 – 19 June 1716) was the seventh shōgun of the Tokugawa dynasty, who ruled from 1713 until his death in 1716. He was the son of Tokugawa Ienobu, thus making him the grandson of Tokugawa Tsunashige, daimyō of Kofu, great-grandson of Tokugawa Iemitsu, great-great grandson of Tokugawa Hidetada, and finally the great-great-great grandson of Tokugawa Ieyasu.

== Early life (1709–1713) ==
Tokugawa Ietsugu was born in 1709 in Edo, being the eldest son of shōgun Tokugawa Ienobu and concubine, Gekkōin. At that time, his father was shōgun, and was being advised by his long-time Confucian advisor, Arai Hakuseki, who held considerable influence in the shōgun's court at Edo. When Ietsugu was born, his father, Ienobu, was 48. His childhood name was Nabematsu (鍋松). Arai had traced the Tokugawa family's bloodline back to the Minamoto family, the founders of the first shogunate. Thus, Ietsugu also was called Minamoto no Ietsugu. He was only three years old when his father died, upon which he became shōgun Ietsugu. He married Yoshiko no Miya (1714–1758), daughter of Emperor Reigen, in 1715; at that time he was only 4 years and Yoshiko no Miya was only one year old.

== Family ==
- Father: Tokugawa Ienobu
- Mother: Gekkōin (1685–1752)
- Wife: Yasonomiya Yoshiko (1714–1758)

== Shōgun (1713–1716) ==
Although shōgun Ietsugu assumed the role as formal head of the bakufu, he was still a toddler. As he was not old or able enough to rule, he was put under the protection and advice of Confucian scholar Arai Hakuseki. Two problems were addressed during Ietsugu's reign: currency reform and foreign trade in Kyūshū. Ietsugu did not take much care of the country's matters; and his advisors, namely Arai Hakuseki, addressed them.

In 1715, he married Yoshiko-no-miya, daughter of Emperor Reigen. He was 5 years old, she was 1 years old.

In 1713, prices were rising. Thus, after various proposals (most after the death of Ienobu) submitted to Shogun Ietsugu and Arai, it was decided to create a new currency. In 1714, the new metallic currency was introduced. While rice had increased during the rule of Ienobu, after the currency was introduced during the rule of Ietsugu, it fell to a lower level.

The currency reform was closely linked to foreign trade. In 1716, only Dutch and Chinese merchant ships could trade from Dejima in Nagasaki. Reform of the currency system also led to reform of trade rules as well. In 1716, a document was addressed saying that the bakufu would appoint two commissioners of Foreign Trade in Edo and Nagasaki, and that 30 Chinese ships and 2 Dutch ships be allowed to enter the country each year. Nonetheless, Japan still remained very isolated.

== Death ==
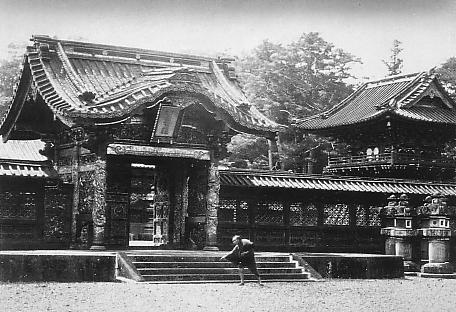
Mausoleum of Ietsugu (posthumously known as Yushoin) at Zōjō-ji in Shiba Park

In Shōtoku 6, on the 30th day of the 4th month (1716), Shogun Ietsugu died of complications of a cold, at the age of six. He had not done much to rule—but was thought of as a playful and mischievous character. Since he had no children the direct descendant line of Tokugawa Iemitsu came to an end. Nonetheless, there were still collateral lineal branches descended from Ieyasu through one of his many children, and the new shōgun, Tokugawa Yoshimune, was chosen from one of these lineal Tokugawa branches. Ietsugu's posthumous Buddhist name was Yushoin and he was buried in Zōjō-ji.

== Eras of Ietsugu's bakufu ==
The years in which Ietsugu was shōgun are more specifically identified by more than one era name or nengō.

- Shōtoku (1711–1716)
- Kyōhō (1716–1736)

== Ancestry ==
Ancestors of Tokugawa Ietsugu

8. Tokugawa Iemitsu, 3rd Tokugawa Shōgun (1604-1651)
4. Tokugawa Tsunashige, daimyō of Kōfu (1644-1678)
9. Junshōin (1622-1683)
2. Tokugawa Ienobu, 6th Tokugawa Shōgun (1662-1712)
5. Chōshōin (1637-1664)
1. Tokugawa Ietsugu, 7th Tokugawa Shōgun
6. Katsuda Gentetsu
3. Gekkōin (1685-1752)
14. Wada Jizaemon
7. Wada

== Notes ==
Military offices
Preceded by Tokugawa Ienobu	Shōgun: Tokugawa Ietsugu; 1713–1716	Succeeded by Tokugawa Yoshimune
