= Masanaga =

- Gender: Male

Origin
- Origin: Japanese
- Meaning: Different meanings depending on the kanji used

Masanaga (written: 政長, 正長, 昌寿 or 雅永) is a masculine Japanese given name. Notable people with the name include:

- Hatakeyama Masanaga (畠山 政長; 1442–1493), Japanese daimyō
- Masanaga Kageyama (影山 雅永; born 1967), Japanese footballer and manager
- Kōriki Masanaga (高力 正長; 1558–1599), Japanese daimyō
- Miyoshi Masanaga (三好 政長; 1508–1549), Japanese samurai and daimyō
- Yonekura Masanaga (米倉 昌寿; 1793–1863), Japanese daimyō
