= Takeda clan =

Japanese clan

Takeda clan 武田
- The emblem (mon) of the Takeda clan
- Home province: Kai
- Parent house: Minamoto clan (源氏)
- Titles: Various
- Founder: Minamoto no Yoshikiyo
- Final ruler: Takeda Katsuyori
- Current head: None
- Founding year: 12th century
- Ruled until: 1582, defeat by Oda Nobunaga
- Cadet branches: Aki Takeda; Wakasa Takeda; Kazusa Takeda; Matsumae clan Nanbu clan Yonekura clan Yanagisawa clan Gotō clan Ogasawara clan Miyoshi clan Akiyama clan

The Takeda clan (武田氏, Takeda-shi) was a Japanese samurai clan active from the late Heian period until the late 16th century. The clan was historically based in Kai Province in present-day Yamanashi Prefecture. The clan reached its greatest influence under the rule of Takeda Shingen, one of the most famous rulers of the period.

== History ==
=== Origin ===
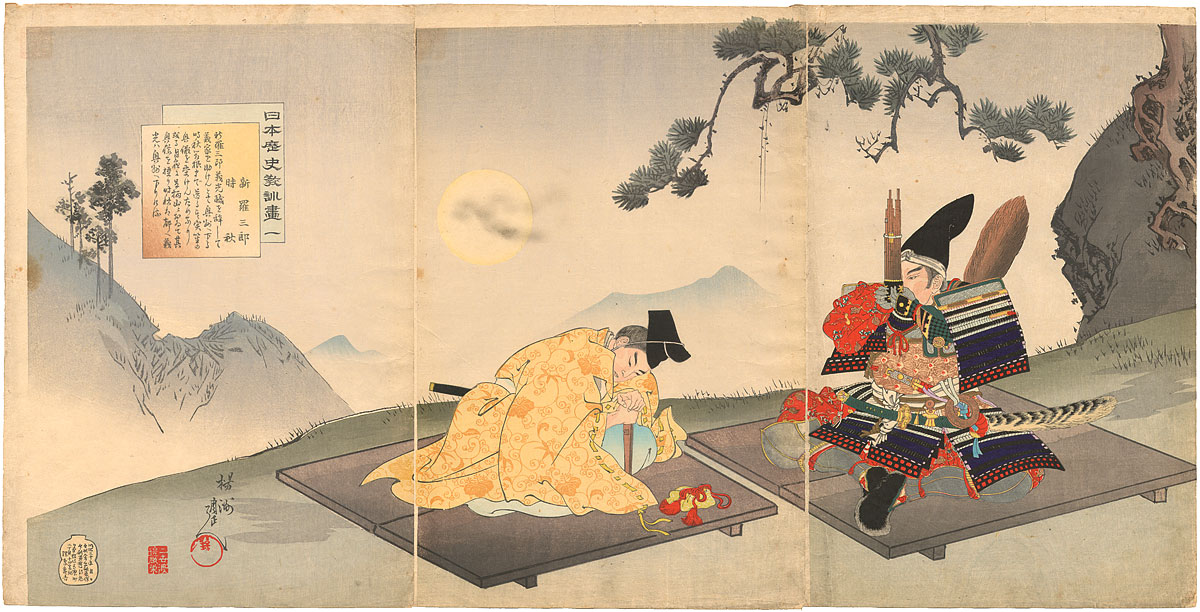
Minamoto no Yoshimitsu was famous in horsemanship and archery, here playing the musical instrument shō

The Takeda are descendants of the Emperor Seiwa (858–876), the 56th Emperor of Japan, and are a branch of the Minamoto clan (Seiwa Genji), by Minamoto no Yoshimitsu (1056–1127), son of the Chinjufu-shōgun Minamoto no Yoriyoshi (988-1075), and brother to the famous Minamoto no Yoshiie (1039–1106). Minamoto no Yoshikiyo (1075–1149), son of Yoshimitsu, was the first to take the name of Takeda, which he took when his father granted him Takeda domain in Hitachi Province; thereafter, he was known as Takeda Yoshikiyo.

=== Kamakura to early Azuchi–Momoyama periods ===
In the 12th century, at the end of the Heian period, the Takeda family-controlled Kai Province. Along with a number of other families, they supported their cousin Minamoto no Yoritomo against the Taira clan in the Genpei War (1180–85). When Yoritomo was first defeated at Ishibashiyama (1181), Takeda Nobuyoshi (1128–86) was applied for help, and the Takeda sent an army of 25,000 soldiers to support Yoritomo. Takeda Nobumitsu (1162–1248), son of Nobuyoshi, fought against the Taira, against Kiso Yoshinaka (1184), distinguished himself in the Battle of Ichinotani (1184), and was appointed Shugo (Governor) of Kai province. He also fought against the Northern Fujiwara (1189) and against Wada Yoshimori (1213). During the Jōkyū War, he helped the Hōjō, and led 50,000 soldiers as 'Daishogun of the Tosando', and in reward received the governorship of Aki province (1221). Takeda Nobuhide (1413–40), eldest son of the Takeda Nobushige (1390–1465), Shugo of Aki, helped the 6th shogun Ashikaga Yoshinori (1394–1441) against the revolt of Isshiki Yoshitsura and was granted the governorship of Wakasa province (1440). Takeda Nobukata (1420–71) inherited the titles of Shugo of Wakasa from his brother Nobuhide, and that of Shugo of Aki from his father Nobushige. During the Ōnin War (1467–77) he occupied Tango province that belonged to Isshiki Yoshinao and received the governorship of Tango province (1469). His brother Takeda Kuninobu (1437–90) inherited the titles of Shugo of Aki, Wakasa, and Tango provinces, but lost Tango in 1474. Until the Sengoku period, the Takeda were Shugo of the provinces of Kai (since Yoritomo), Aki (since 1221), and Wakasa (since 1440).

=== Sengoku period ===
Immediately prior to the Sengoku period, the Takeda helped to suppress the Rebellion of Uesugi Zenshū (1416–1417). Uesugi Zenshū (d. 1417) was the kanrei chief advisor to Ashikaga Mochiuji, an enemy of the central Ashikaga shogunate and the Kantō kubō governor-general of the Kantō region. Mochiuji, lord of the Uesugi clan, made a reprisal against the Takeda clan in 1415. This reprisal began a rivalry between the Uesugi and Takeda clans which would last roughly 150 years until the destruction of the Takeda clan at the end of the Sengoku period. While this rivalry existed, the Takeda and the Uesugi still had a huge amount of respect for one another.

=== Takeda Shingen ===
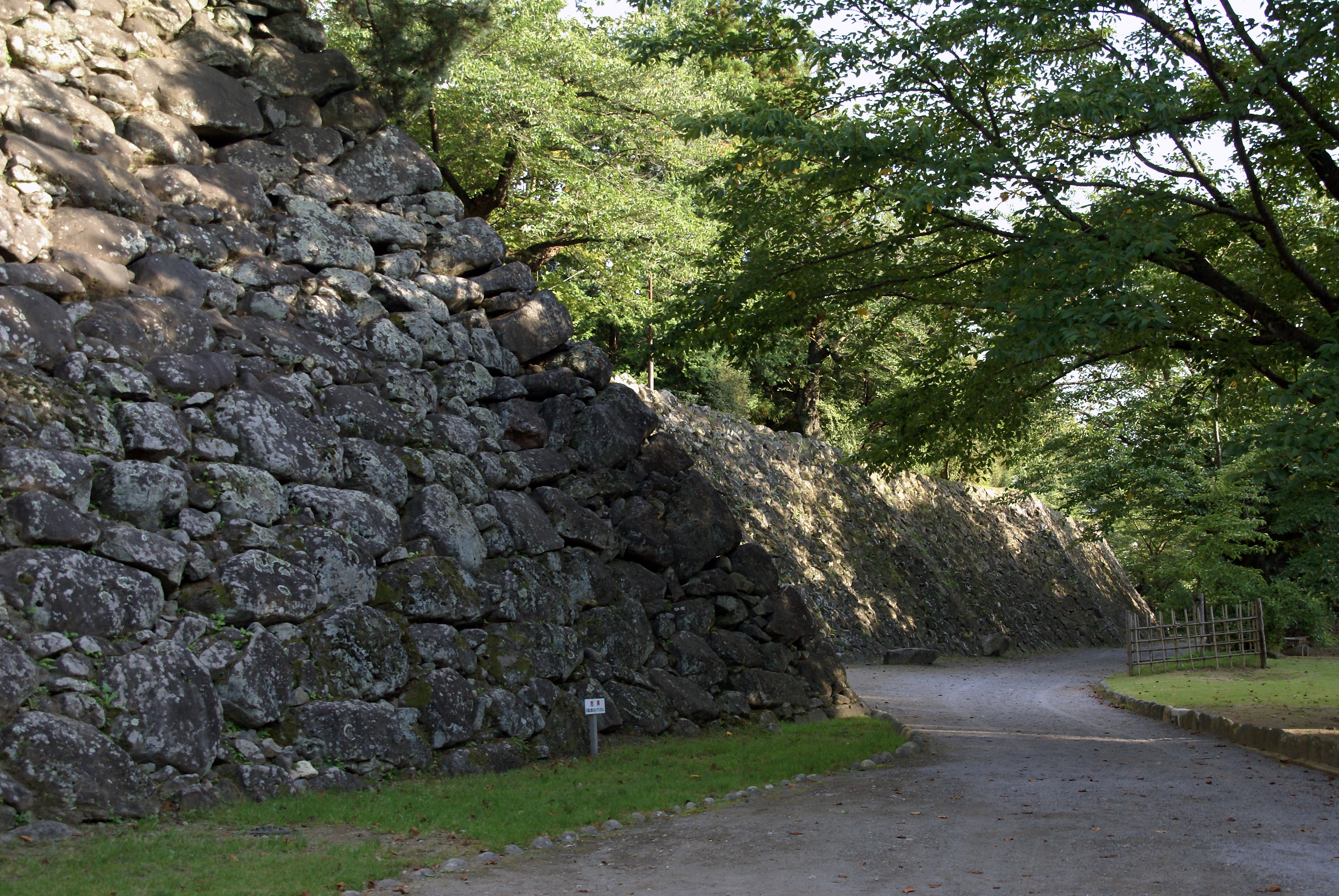
Komoro Castle, a Takeda clan's castle in Shinano province

Takeda Harunobu (1521 – 1573) succeeded his father Nobutora in 1540 and became shugo lord of Kai Province in present-day Yamanashi Prefecture. In this period the Takeda began to quickly expand from their base in Kai Province. In 1559, Harunobu changed his name to the better-known Takeda Shingen. He faced the Hōjō clan a number of times, and most of his expansion was to the north, where he fought his most famous battles against Uesugi Kenshin. This series of regional skirmishes is known as the Battles of Kawanakajima. The battles began in 1553, and the best known and severest among them was fought on September 10, 1561.

Shingen is famous for his tactical genius, and innovations, though some historians have argued that his tactics were not particularly impressive nor revolutionary. Nevertheless, Shingen is perhaps most famous for his use of the cavalry charge at the Battle of Mikatagahara. The strength of Shingen's new tactic became so famous that the Takeda army came to be known as the Kiba Gundan (騎馬軍団), or 'mounted army'. Up until the mid-16th century and Shingen's rise to power, mounted samurai were primarily archers. There was already a trend at this time towards larger infantry-based armies, including a large number of foot archers. In order to defeat these missile troops, Shingen transformed his samurai from archers to lancers.

=== Decline of the Takeda clan ===
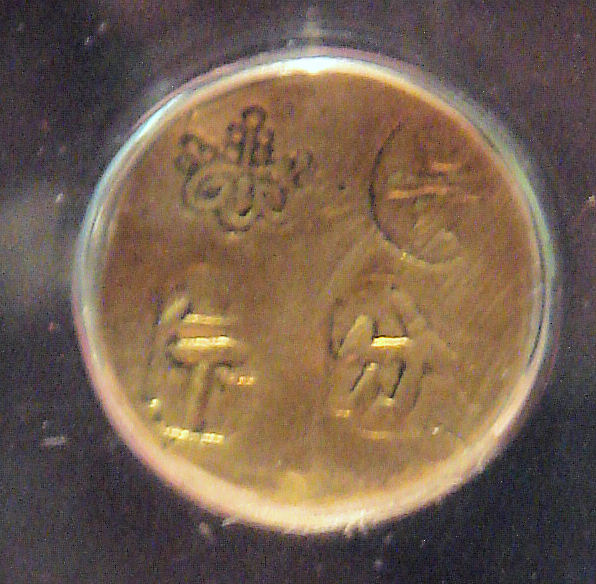
Gold coin of the Takeda clan of Kai (also called Kōshū (甲州金)) in the 16th century, an early example of Japanese currency

Shingen died on May 13, 1573, at age 53 from illness. His son Takeda Katsuyori (1546–1582) effectively succeeded Shingen though the nominal head of the family was his grandson Takeda Nobukatsu; Katsuyori continued Shingen's aggressive expansion plan south and westward and was initially successful, briefly achieving the largest extent of Takeda rule. However, he was defeated in the Battle of Nagashino in 1575 by Oda Nobunaga and Tokugawa Ieyasu.

After Nagashino, the Takeda clan fell into sharp decline as it had lost many of its most notable samurai during the battle. Katsuyori's position within the clan also became precarious (as he did not fully inherit the clan leadership position); in 1582, two of his relatives defected to the Oda/Tokugawa alliance and Nobunaga succeeded in destroying the Takeda clan shortly thereafter. The campaign saw most of the Takeda followers simply abandoning Katsuyori and the other Takeda family members to their fate. The clan was effectively eliminated, although descendants of the Takeda clan would take prominent positions in the Tokugawa shogunate, established in 1603.

== Modern period ==
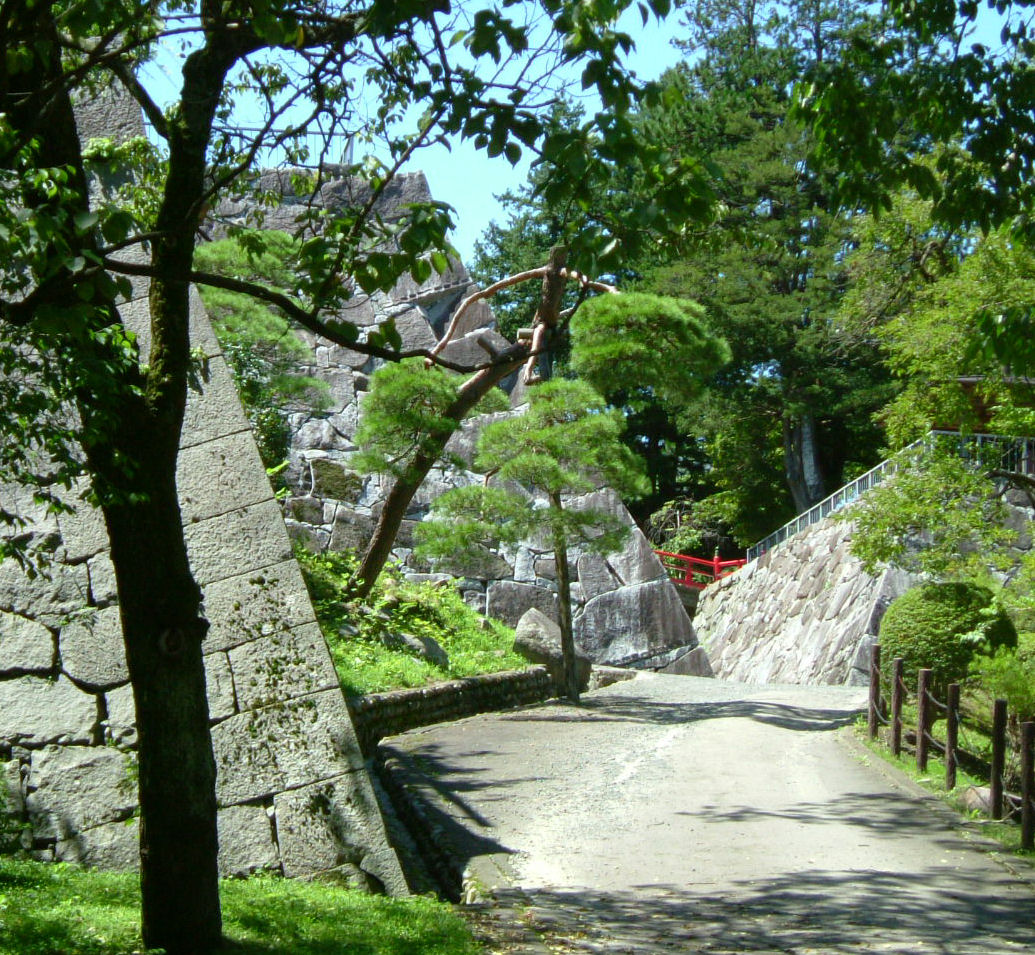
Morioka Castle, the seat of the Nambu of Morioka

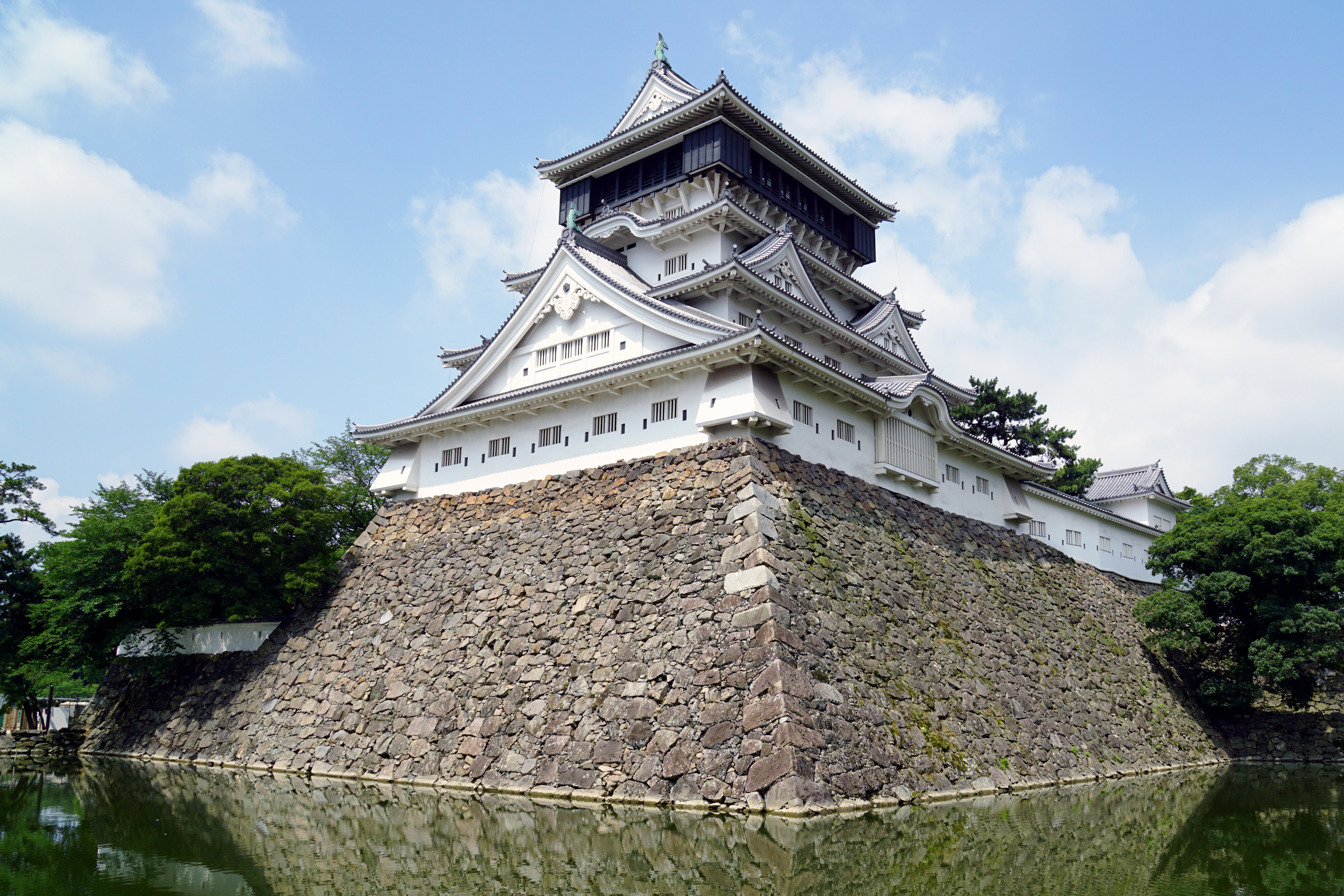
Kokura Castle, seat of the Ogasawara of Kokura

Takeda is also a fairly common family name in modern Japan, though it is unlikely that everyone with the Takeda name is descended from this noble house (several divisions of the family have the Takeda name).

In fact, most of the real descendants of the Takeda had a different name when they created a cadet branch. It is also acknowledged that members of the clan married into other Japanese families.

During the Tokugawa period, several daimyō families were direct descendants of the Takeda. In 1868, these daimyō families were:

- The Matsumae, descendants of Takeda Nobuhiro (1431-1494), son of Takeda Nobukata (1420-1471) of the Aki Takeda. They were daimyō of Matsumae, the only feudal fief (han) of Hokkaidō.
- The Nanbu, descendants of Takeda Mitsuyuki (1165-1236), grandson of Takeda Kiyomitsu (1110-1168), established himself at Nambu (Kai Province) and took that name. The Nambu were daimyō of Morioka, of Shichinohe and Hachinohe (Mutsu Province).
- The Yanagisawa, descendants of Takeda Nobunaga, a grandson of Takeda Nobuyoshi (1128-1186), were daimyō of Kōriyama (Yamato Province), of Kurokawa and Mikkaichi (Echigo Province).
- The Yonekura, descendants of Takeda Kiyomitsu, settled at Koiwasuji Yonekura and took the name Yonekura. They were daimyō of Mutsuura Domain (Musashi province)
- The Gotō, descendants of Takeda Nobuhiro, were daimyō of Gotō (the Gotō Islands in Hizen Province).
- The Ogasawara are also a cadet branch of the Takeda, by Takeda Nagakiyo (1162–1242), grandson of Takeda Kiyomitsu (1110-1168), and the first to take the name of Ogasawara. His descendants were shugo (governors) of Shinano and Hida Provinces, and during the 16th century were at war with their Takeda cousins. In 1868, they were daimyō of Kokura, of Chikuza (Buzen Province), of Ashi (Harima Province), of Karatsu (Hizen Province), and of Katsuyama (Echizen Province).

In 1868, two branches named Takeda were also ranked among the Kōke (the High Families). This title was given to descendants of great dispossessed daimyo families of the Kamakura period to Sengoku period such as the Takeda, the Kyōgoku, the Rokkaku, the Ōtomo, the Toki, the Isshiki and the Hatakeyama clans. They received a pension from the shogunate and had privileged missions confided to them.

== Cadet branches ==
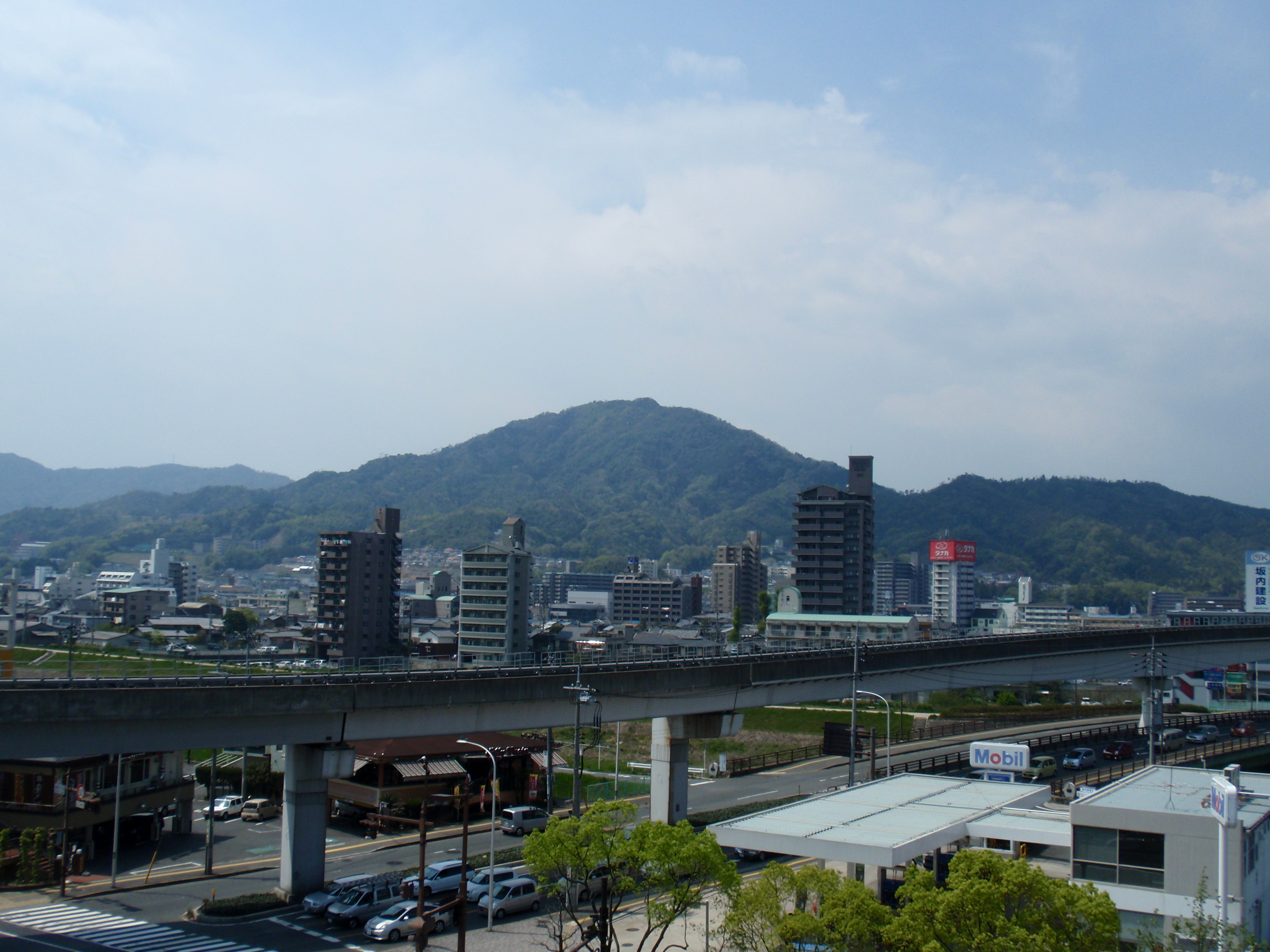
Site of Kanayama Castle (Hiroshima Prefecture), a huge mountain castle surrounded by 50 kuruwa (castle defense walls), on top of the 411m of Mt Takeda, built at the end of the Kamakura period, the seat of the Aki Takeda

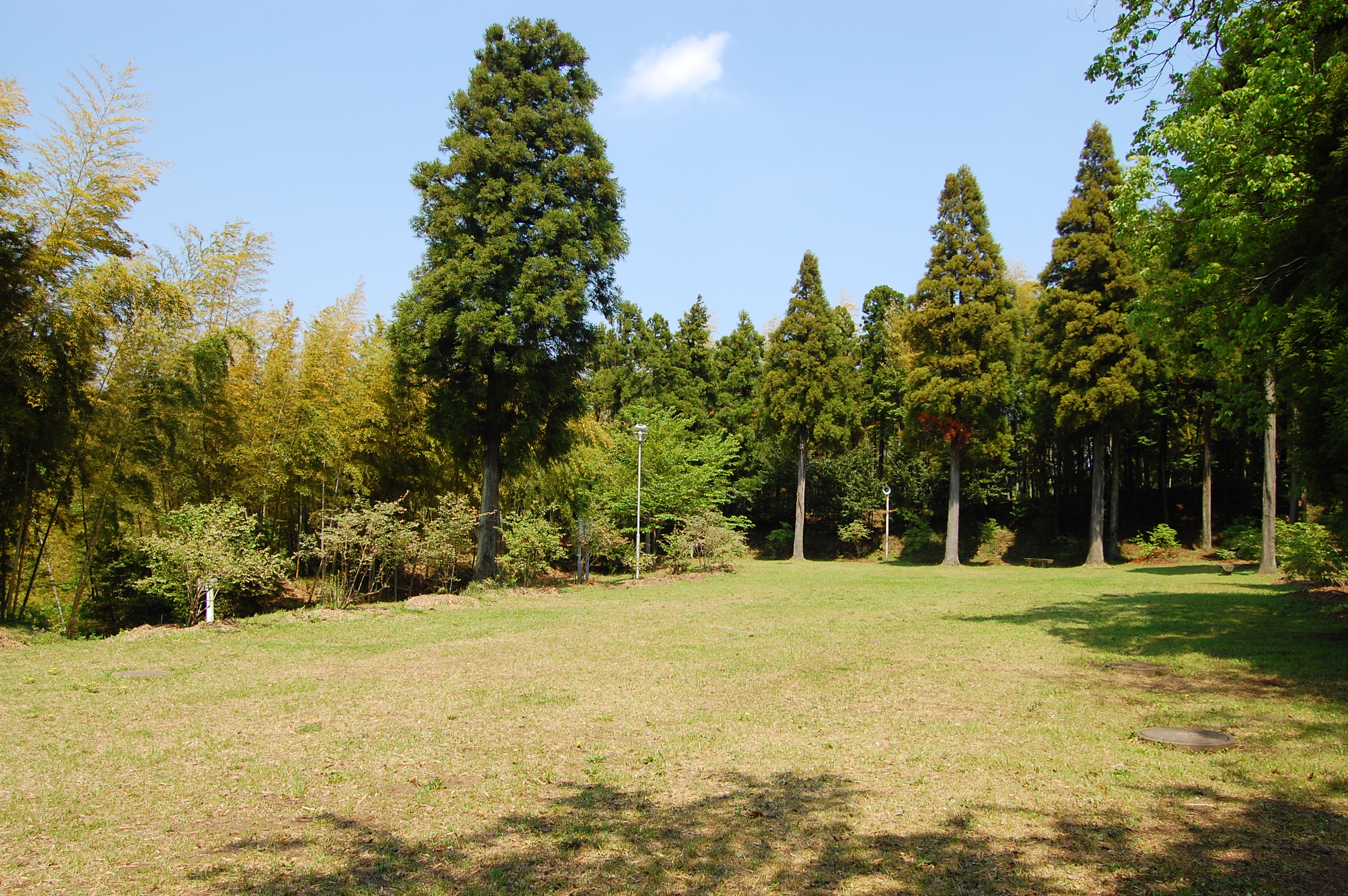
Site of Mariyatsu Castle (Kisarazu, Chiba Prefecture), Koguchi (entrance of castle), the seat of the Kazusa Takeda

Three major cadet branches of the Takeda clan were established across Japan, along with several smaller branches. Due to the establishment of these cadet branches, the main Takeda clan in Kai Province is also referred to as the Kai Takeda clan.

=== Aki Takeda ===
The Aki Takeda clan, established in Aki Province in the present-day western part of Hiroshima Prefecture. Takeda Nobumitsu (1162–1248), Shugo of Kai, received the governorship of Aki province in 1221. Takeda Nobutake († 1362) was the last Takeda Shugo of the two provinces of Kai and Aki. His elder son Nobunari received Kai and the younger Ujinobu received Aki province.

=== Wakasa Takeda ===
The Aki Takeda was granted the governorship of Wakasa province in 1440. The Wakasa Takeda clan was established in Wakasa Province in present-day southern Fukui Prefecture, and separates from Aki province in 1500, when Takeda Motonobu (1461-1521) ruled Wakasa, while his uncle Takeda Mototsuna (1441-1505) ruled Aki. The Wakasa Takeda were known for their patronage of the arts and developing the Takeda school of military etiquette.

=== Kazusa Takeda ===
The Kazusa Takeda clan, established at the beginning of the Sengoku period in Kazusa Province in the present-day central area of Chiba Prefecture. Along with the Satomi clan of Awa Province in the southern part of present-day Chiba Prefecture the two clans replaced the dominance of the Chiba clan in the region. The Kazusa Takeda is also known as the Mariyatsu Takeda, a reference to their base of power, Mariyatsu Castle.

== Clan literature ==
The Kōshū Hatto, composed at some point in the 15th century, is the code of law of the Takeda family, while the Kōyō Gunkan, composed largely by Kōsaka Masanobu in the mid-16th century, is an epic poem recording the family's history and Shingen's innovations in military tactics.

== Notable figures of the Takeda clan ==
Among the notable members of the Takeda clan was Takeda Nobushige, who wrote the Kyujukyu Kakun, which introduced the 99 rules for the clan members. Takeda Nobumitsu, who was a noted warrior under the Hojo shikken of Kamakura, became a monk and founded the Takeda family of Kai. Another important figure was Minamoto no Yoshimitsu, who developed the Daito-ryu Aikijujutsu/Takeda-ryu. Other noted members include Nobuyoshi, Nobutora, Harunobu (Shingen), Katsuyori, Matsuhime

=== Important members ===
- Takeda Nobuyoshi (1128–86) - Founder of the Takeda clan
- Takeda Nobutora – Shingen's father
- Takeda Shingen – one of Japan's most famous warlords, Shingen expanded his domains greatly and became one of the major powers in the country for a time.
- Takeda Katsuyori – Shingen's son, Katsuyori commanded his father's armies after his death, and saw the fall of the Takeda family.
- Matsuhime – Shingen's daughter
- Takeda Nobushige – Shingen's younger brother, who held their father's favor to be heir of the clan, continued to support his older brother throughout his life, he also wrote the Kyūjūkyū Kakun, a set of 99 short rules for Takeda house members.
- Motsugai Takeda - Japanese Zen priest and martial artist from the Edo period. Founder of the Fusen-ryū school of jujutsu.
- Takeda Sōkaku (1859–1943) - was the restorer of the Daitō-ryū Aiki-jūjutsu school of jūjutsu, and the first to teach the art outside of the Takeda family.

== Crests ==
- Four diamonds (pictured)
- Four diamonds surrounded by a solid ring
- Two cranes bowing their heads together
- A centipede
- Hanabishi (three vertical flowers)
- Fūrinkazan (a battle standard with the writing: "風林火山", which literally means: "Wind, Forest, Fire, Mountain".)
- The Tai (大) character
