= Yonekura Masaharu =

Yonekura Masaharu 米倉昌晴
- Born: May 30, 1728
- Died: January 18, 1786 (aged 57)
- Other names: Tango-no-kami
- Occupations: Daimyō, Wakadoshiyori

Yonekura Masaharu (米倉昌晴; May 30, 1728 – January 18, 1786) was the 3rd daimyō of Mutsuura Domain in southern Musashi Province, Honshū, Japan (modern-day Kanazawa-ku, Yokohama, Kanagawa prefecture) and 6th head of the Yonekura clan. His courtesy title was Tango-no-kami.

== Biography ==
Masaharu was the second son of Yonekura Masanori, a 3000 koku hatamoto. He was adopted as head of the Yonekura clan and on the unexpected death of Yonekura Satonori without any heirs in 1749. He was confirmed as daimyō of Mutsuura Domain in a formal audience with Shōgun Tokugawa Ieshige.

As daimyō, he was assigned to several ceremonial postings as guard of various gates to Edo Castle. In January 1776, he became a Sōshaban (Master of Ceremonies) and in April 1777 he rose to the position of wakadoshiyori (Junior Councilor) under Shōgun Tokugawa Ieharu. However, with the assassination of Tanuma Okitomo in April 1784, he rapidly lost favor at Court and attempted to resign his posts, but his request was refused. However, he fell ill later in the year, and died two years later at the age of 58.

Yonekura Masaharu was married to the daughter of Yanagisawa Masatsune, the daimyō of Mikkaichi Domain, in Echigo Province, and had a total of eight sons and six daughters. His grave is at the temple of Hase-dera in Shibuya, Tokyo.

Preceded by Yonekura Satonori	3rd Daimyō of Mutsuura; 1749–1786	Succeeded by Yonekura Masakata
