= Mutsuura Domain =

Japanese historical estate in Musashi province

Mutsuura Domain (1869–1871) 六浦藩 Musashi-Kanazawa Domain (1696–1869) 武蔵金沢藩
- Domain of Japan
- 1696–1871
- Capital: Mutsuura jin'ya
  - Type: Daimyō
- Historical era: Edo period
  - Established: 1696
  - Disestablished: 1871
Preceded by	Succeeded by
Musashi Province	Mutsuura Prefecture
- Today part of: Kanagawa Prefecture

Mutsuura Domain (六浦藩, Mutsuura-han) was a Japanese feudal domain of the Edo period, located in southern Musashi Province in what is now part of Kanagawa Prefecture. Mutsuura was a Fudai domain. It consisted of two separate geographic areas, one in Kuragi District, Musashi, and the other in Osumi District, Sagami, with its headquarters in Musashi in what is now part of Kanazawa-ku, Yokohama.

From its location near the famous medieval library of Kanazawa Bunko, it was referred to as Musashi-Kanazawa Domain (武蔵金沢藩, Musashi-Kanazawa-han) or Bushū-Kanazawa Domain (武州金沢藩, Bushū-Kanazawa-han) during the Edo period, although the Kanazawa Bunko itself was not within its territory.

In the han system, Mutsuura was a political and economic abstraction based on periodic cadastral surveys and projected agricultural yields. In other words, the domain was defined in terms of kokudaka, not land area. This was different from the feudalism of the West.

== History ==
The Yonekura clan, former retainers of the Takeda clan of Kai Province, pledged allegiance to Tokugawa Ieyasu after the Takeda were destroyed by Oda Nobunaga, and subsequently served as hatamoto in the Tokugawa shogunate after the Battle of Sekigahara in 1603. Yonekura Masatada (米倉昌尹) (1637–1699) was favored by Shōgun Tokugawa Tsunayoshi, rising rapidly through the ranks until he reached the post of wakadoshiyori in 1696.

The additional revenues provided by this office propelled him past the 10,000 koku necessary to qualify as a daimyō, and he became the first lord of Mutsuura Domain. He was subsequently transferred to Minagawa Domain in Kōzuke Province. His line died out with his grandson Yonekura Masateru (米倉昌照) (1683–1712), but a son of Yanagisawa Yoshiyasu was selected to inherit the family name, taking the name Yonekura Tadasuke and was transferred back to Mutsuura Domain in 1722.

Mutsuura Domain was a jin'ya domain, and was not allowed a castle. It also lacked a unified area, but consisted of a number of widely dispersed holdings in what is now Kanazawa-ku, Yokohama, Hadano, Kanagawa and Hiratsuka, Kanagawa. Although the jin'ya itself was located in what is now southern Yokohama, the clan's family temple was the temple of Zorin-ji in Hadano.

During the Bakumatsu period, the 8th (and final) daimyō, Yonekura Masakoto, sided with the new Meiji government in the Boshin War of the Meiji Restoration. His domain was renamed Mutsuura Domain in June 1868, to avoid confusion with Kanazawa Domain in Kaga Province. Mutsuura Domain was abolished on July 4, 1871, with the abolition of the han system, becoming Mutsuura Prefecture. On November 14 of the same year, it was assigned to the new Kanagawa Prefecture.

== List of daimyōs ==
- Yonekura clan (fudai) 1722–1871

#	Name	Tenure	Courtesy title	Court Rank	revenues
1	Yonekura Tadasuke (米倉忠仰)	1722–1735	主計頭	Lower 5th (従五位下)	12,000 koku
2	Yonekura Satonori (米倉里矩)	1735–1749	-	-	12,000 koku
3	Yonekura Masaharu (米倉昌晴)	1749–1786	Tango-no-kami	Lower 5th (従五位下)	12,000 koku
4	Yonekura Masakata (米倉昌賢)	1786–1798	Nagato-no-kami	Lower 5th (従五位下)	12,000 koku
5	Yonekura Masayoshi (米倉昌由)	1798–1803	Tango-no-kami	Lower 5th (従五位下)	12,000 koku
6	Yonekura Masanori (米倉昌俊)	1803–1812	Tango-no-kami	Lower 5th (従五位下)	12,000 koku
7	Yonekura Masanaga (米倉昌寿)	1812–1860	Tango-no-kami	Lower 5th (従五位下)	12,000 koku
8	Yonekura Masakoto (米倉昌言)	1860–1871	Tango-no-kami	3rd (従三位), Viscount	12,000 koku
