= Yonekura Tadasuke =

Japanese daimyō (1706–1736)

Yonekura Tadasuke 米倉忠仰
- Born: March 15, 1706
- Died: March 29, 1736 (aged 30)
- Other names: Tango-no-kami
- Occupation: Daimyō

Yonekura Tadasuke (米倉忠仰; March 15, 1706 – May 29, 1736) was a daimyō in mid-Edo period Japan. His courtesy title was Tango-no-kami.

== Biography ==
Yonekura Tadasuke was the sixth son of Yanagisawa Yoshiyasu, a favorite of shōgun Tokugawa Tsunayoshi who served in a number of important posts within the administration of the Tokugawa shogunate. In 1710, he was adopted by Yonekura Masateru, the daimyō of Minagawa Domain in Shimotsuke Province, and succeeded to the head of the Yonekura clan and daimyo of Minagawa two years later. On September 1, 1716, he was received in a formal audience by Shogun Tokugawa Yoshimune. On July 27, 1722, he transferred the seat of the Yonekura clan to Mutsuura Domain in southern Musashi Province, (modern-day Kanazawa-ku, Yokohama, Kanagawa Prefecture), where his descendants continued to reside until the Meiji Restoration.

Yonelura Tadasuke died of illness at the young age of 30, leaving behind Yonekura Satonori, his two-year-old heir. This resulted in an O-Ie Sōdō, in which some of his retainers misrepresented the young heir's age to the shogunate.

Yonekura Tadasuke was married to a daughter of Honda Tadanao, the daimyō of Koriyama Domain in Yamato Province.

Preceded by Yonekura Masateru	3rd Daimyō of Minagawa; 1712–1722	Succeeded by none
Preceded by none	1st Daimyō of Mutsuura; 1722–1735	Succeeded by Yonekura Satonori
