= Yonekura Masanori =

Yonekura Masanori 米倉昌俊
- Born: October 15, 1784
- Died: May 28, 1812 (aged 27); Edo, Japan
- Other names: Tango-no-kami
- Occupation: Daimyō

Yonekura Masanori (米倉昌俊; October 15, 1784 – May 28, 1812) was the 6th daimyō of Mutsuura Domain in southern Musashi Province, Honshū, Japan (modern-day Kanazawa-ku, Yokohama, Kanagawa prefecture) and 9th head of the Yonekura clan. His courtesy title was Tango-no-kami.

== Biography ==
Yonekura Masanori was born as the 9th son of Mizuno Kadakane, daimyō of Karatsu Domain in Hizen Province. In January 1803, he was adopted to be heir to the 5th daimyō of Mutsuura Domain (Yonekura Masayoshi), and was confirmed to that position in an audience with Shōgun Tokugawa Ienari in March of the same year. Yonekura Masayoshi then claimed illness, and retired on June 15, surrendering his title and official positions.

As daimyō, Masanori was assigned to several ceremonial postings as guard of various gates to Edo Castle. In August 1811, he was dismissed from his post as magistrate in Osaka for incompetence, and died of a sudden illness on April 18, 1812. However, there is some uncertainty to this date, and the term ‘sudden illness’ was often an official euphemism for seppuku.

Masanaga had six sons and two daughters his official wife, a daughter of Matsudaira Tadatsuku, daimyō of Anegasaki Domain, but died childless.

== See also ==
- Yonekura clan

| Preceded by Yonekura Masayoshi | 6th Daimyō of Mutsuura; 1803–1812 | Succeeded by Yonekura Masanaga |
