= Yonekura Satonori =

Yonekura Satonari 米倉里矩
- Born: April 22, 1733
- Died: April 22, 1749 (aged 16)
- Other names: Tango-no-kami
- Occupation: Daimyō

Yonekura Satonari (米倉里矩; September 13, 1733 – April 22, 1749) was the 2nd daimyō of Mutsuura Domain in southern Musashi Province, Honshū, Japan (modern-day Kanazawa-ku, Yokohama, Kanagawa prefecture) and 5th head of the Yonekura clan. His courtesy title was Tango-no-kami.

== Biography ==
Yonekura Satonari was the eldest son of Yonekura Tadasuke, the 1st daimyō of Mutsuura Domain. He succeeded to the head of the Yonekura clan and as daimyō of Mutsuura Domain at the age of two, on the death of his father in 1735. In fear that the domain would be suppressed, his retainers reported Satonari’s age to be nine years old to the shogunate inspectors. This deception was soon discovered, and the retainers were punished. Due to his young age, the Tokugawa shogunate appointed Yanagisawa Yoshikira, daimyō of Koriyama Domain in Yamato province to be his guardian. He was received in a formal audience by Shōgun Tokugawa Ieshige in March 1746, but fell ill and died only a few days later.

Yonekura Satonari had no heirs. His grave is at the clan temple of Hase-dera in Shibuya, Tokyo.

Preceded by Yonekura Tadasuke	2nd Daimyō of Mutsuura; 1735-1749	Succeeded by Yonekura Masaharu
