= Yonekura Masakata =

Yonekura Masakata 米倉昌賢
- Born: July 21, 1759
- Died: August 5, 1798 (aged 39); Edo, Japan
- Other names: Nagato-no-kami
- Occupation: Daimyō

Yonekura Masakata (米倉昌賢; July 21, 1758 – August 5, 1798) was the 4th daimyō of Mutsuura Domain in southern Musashi Province, Honshū, Japan (modern-day Kanazawa-ku, Yokohama, Kanagawa prefecture) and 7th head of the Yonekura clan. His courtesy title was Nagato-no-kami.

== Biography ==
Yonekura Masakata was born as the second son of Yonekura Masaharu, the third daimyō of Mutsuura Domain. He was appointed heir in 1777 and succeeded his father in December 1785. As daimyō, he was assigned to several ceremonial postings as guard of various gates to Edo Castle. However, in 1793 he resigned from his posts due to illness, but retained the position of daimyō. He died on August 5, 1798, at the age of 40.

His grave is at the temple of Hase-dera in Shibuya, Tokyo.

Masakata was married to the daughter of Yanagisawa Nobutoki, daimyō of Koriyama Domain, by whom he had two daughters.

Preceded by Yonekura Masaharu	4th Daimyō of Mutsuura; 1786-1798	Succeeded by Yonekura Masayoshi
