= Yonekura Masayoshi =

Yonekura Masayoshi 米倉昌由
- Born: December 8, 1777
- Died: February 8, 1817 (aged 39); Edo, Japan
- Other names: Tango-no-kami
- Occupation: Daimyō

Yonekura Masayoshi (米倉昌由; December 8, 1777 – February 8, 1817) was the 5th daimyō of Mutsuura Domain in southern Musashi Province, Honshū, Japan (modern-day Kanazawa-ku, Yokohama, Kanagawa prefecture) and 9th head of the Yonekura clan. His courtesy title was Tango-no-kami.

== Biography ==
Yonekura Masayoshi was born as the 2nd son of a 3000 koku hatamoto of the Yonekura clan, and married a daughter of 4th daimyō of Mutsuura Domain (Yonekura Masakata). In 1798, upon Masakata’s death, he was selected as heir, and was confirmed to that position in an audience with Shōgun Tokugawa Ienari in September of the same year. As daimyō, he was assigned to several ceremonial postings as guard of various gates to Edo Castle. However, on June 15, 1803 he claimed illness was retired, surrendering his title and official positions to his adopted son, Yonekura Masanori.

In May 1805, he took the tonsure, and died on February 8, 1817. His grave is at the temple of Hase-dera in Shibuya, Tokyo.

Masayoshi had a single daughter, and died without a male heir.

Preceded by Yonekura Masakata	5th Daimyō of Mutsuura; 1798–1803	Succeeded by Yonekura Masanori
