= Takeda clan (Aki) =

Aki Takeda clan
- The emblem (mon) of the Takeda clan
- Home province: Aki
- Parent house: Takeda clan
- Titles: Various
- Founder: Takeda Ujinobu
- Founding year: 14th century
- Cadet branches: Wakasa

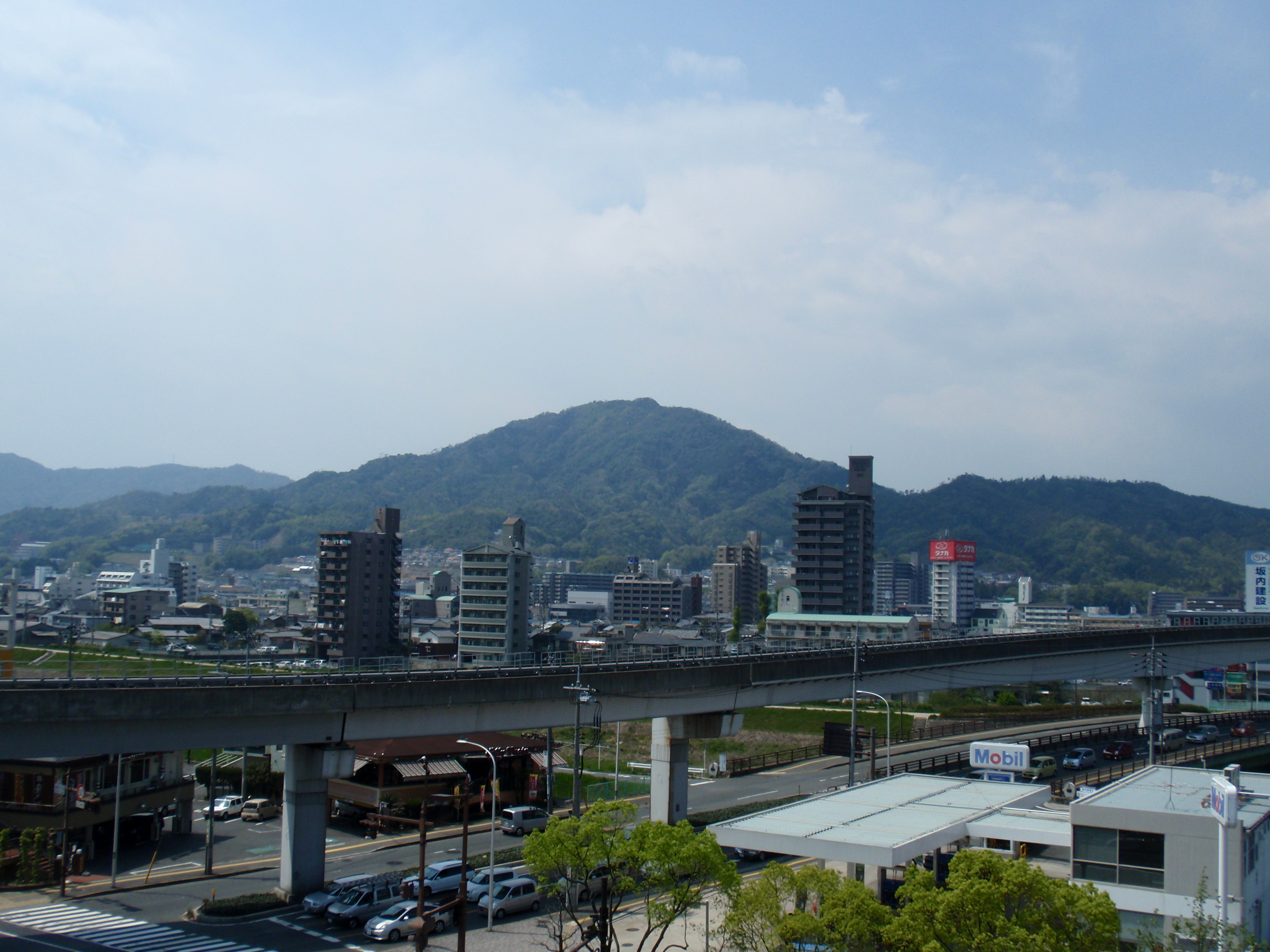
Site of Kanayama Castle (Hiroshima Prefecture), a huge mountain castle surrounded by 50 kuruwa (defense walls), on top the 411m of Mt Takeda, built at the end of the Kamakura period, seat of the Aki Takeda

The Takeda clan of Aki Province was a cadet branch of the famed Takeda clan of the Kai Province of Imperial Japan, descended from Emperor Seiwa (850–880) and the Minamoto clan (Seiwa Genji). The Takeda of Wakasa were a branch of the Takeda of Aki.

== History ==
=== History of the Takeda of Kai and Aki ===
When Minamoto no Yoritomo was first defeated at Ishibashiyama (1181), Takeda Nobuyoshi (1128–86) had been asked by Yoritomo for help. The Takeda sent an army of 25,000 men to support Yoritomo.

Takeda Nobumitsu (1162–1248), son of Nobuyoshi, fought against the Taira, against Kiso Yoshinaka (1184), distinguished himself in the Battle of Ichinotani (1184), and was appointed Shugo (Governor) of Kai province. He also fought against the Northern Fujiwara (1189) and against Wada Yoshimori (1213). During the Jōkyū War, he helped the Hōjō, and led 50,000 soldiers as 'Daishogun of the Tosando'. As a reward he received the governorship of Aki province (1221).

Takeda Nobutake († 1362) was the last Takeda Shugo of the two provinces of Kai and Aki. His elder son Nobunari received Kai and the younger Ujinobu received Aki province.

=== History as a separate Aki branch ===
From the Muromachi period until the Sengoku period, the Takeda of Aki ruled Aki province (since 1221), Wakasa province (since 1440), were supporters of the Ashikaga against the Southern Dynasty, and sided with the Hosokawa clan during the Ōnin war (1467–1477).

Takeda Nobuhide (1413–1440), eldest son of the Shugo of Aki Takeda Nobushige (1390–1465), helped the 6th shogun Ashikaga Yoshinori against the revolt of Isshiki Yoshitsura (1440) and was rewarded with the governorship of Wakasa province. Takeda Nobukata (1420–1471) inherited the titles of Shugo of Wakasa from his brother Nobuhide who died childless, and that of Shugo of Aki from his father Nobushige.

During the Ōnin War (1467–1477) Nobuhide occupied Tango province that belonged to Isshiki Yoshinao and was appointed Shugo of Tango (1469) by the bakufu. His brother Takeda Kuninobu (1437–1490) received the titles of Shugo of Aki, Wakasa and Tango provinces, but lost Tango in 1474.

=== Principal fortress ===
The principal fortress of the Aki Takeda was Kanayama castle, built on the top of the 411 meters of Mount Takeda; a castle built by Takeda Nobumune (1269–1330) in the late Kamakura period, near the present city of Hiroshima.

=== Fading days ===
However, clashes with Mōri Motonari of Aki between 1516 and 1541 led to the clan's downfall. The principal line came to an end with the death of Takeda Nobuzane in 1555.

The priest Ankokuji Ekei (1537 or 1539–1600) was a grandson ( or a son according to theories) of Takeda Shigekiyo (†1541) of the Aki Takeda. As a close advisor of Toyotomi Hideyoshi, he received in 1585 a fiefdom of 23,000 koku in Iyo Province after the Shikoku campaign. And in 1586, after the conquest of Kyushu, his holdings were expanded to 60,000 koku. At the Battle of Sekigahara (1600), he sided with the western army against Tokugawa Ieyasu, and was condemned to death, along with Ishida Mitsunari and Konishi Yukinaga.

During the Tokugawa period, the Harada and the Yamaguchi families, samurai of the Asano clan (Daimyō of Hiroshima), were descended from the Takeda of Aki. According to the Yamaguchi family, the three most important strongholds that belonged to the Takeda of Aki were Kanayama castle (seen above), Kitsune castle and Ato castle (all in Aki province).
