= Tokugawa Ienobu =

Japanese Samurai, Daimyo and Military leader of Japan from 1709 to 1712

Senior First Rank Tokugawa Ienobu
- 徳川 家宣
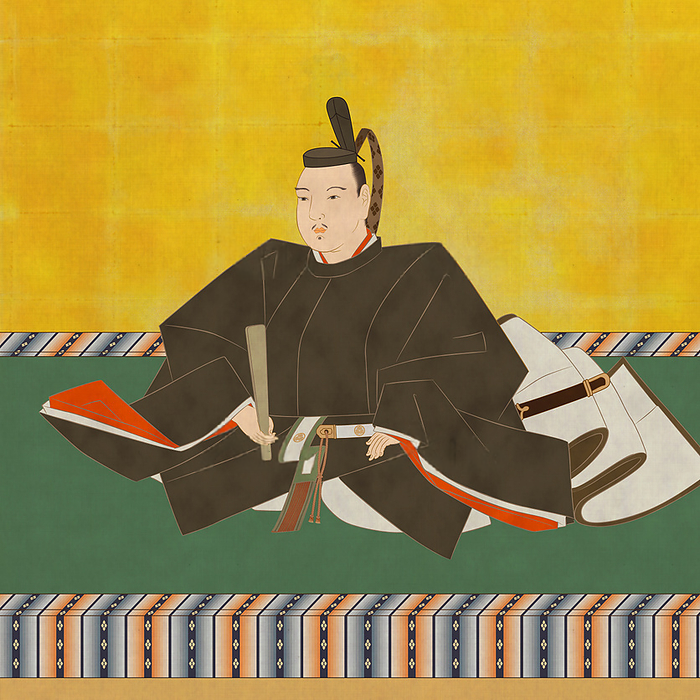

Shōgun
- In office 11 May 1709 – 12 November 1712
- Monarchs: Higashiyama; Nakamikado
- Preceded by: Tokugawa Tsunayoshi
- Succeeded by: Tokugawa Ietsugu

Personal details
- Born: 15 June 1662 Kōfu, Yamanashi, Tokugawa shogunate
- Died: 12 November 1712 (aged 50) Tokugawa shogunate (now Japan)
- Children: Tokugawa Iechiyo; Tokugawa Daigorō (1709–1710); Tokugawa Ietsugu; Tokugawa Torakichi (1711–1711); Adopted: Masahime
- Parents: Tokugawa Tsunashige; Chōshōin
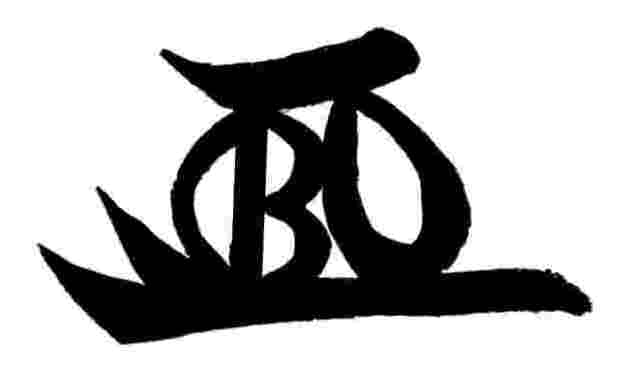
- Signature

Tokugawa Ienobu (徳川 家宣; 11 June 1662 – 12 November 1712) was a Japanese samurai, daimyo and the sixth shōgun of the Tokugawa dynasty of Japan. He was the eldest son of Tokugawa Tsunashige, thus making him the nephew of Tokugawa Ietsuna and Tokugawa Tsunayoshi, the grandson of Tokugawa Iemitsu, the great-grandson of Tokugawa Hidetada, and the great-great-grandson of Tokugawa Ieyasu. All of Ienobu's children died young.

== Early life (1662–1694) ==
Tokugawa Ienobu was born as the oldest son of Tokugawa Tsunashige, daimyō of Kōfu, in 1662. His mother was a concubine. Tsunashige was the middle brother of Tokugawa Ietsuna and Tokugawa Tsunayoshi and the second son of Tokugawa Iemitsu with his concubine, thus making Ienobu their nephew. In 1662, Ienobu's uncle, Ietsuna was shōgun, and his father, Tsunashige, was daimyō of Kōfu, a very valuable piece of land to the Tokugawa. Before becoming shōgun his name was Tokugawa Tsunatoyo, the 4th daimyō of Kōfu Domain from the Tokugawa clan. His childhood name was Toramatsu (虎松).

Not much is known of Ienobu's early life except that he was expected to become the next daimyō of Kofu after the death of his father. However, after Tokugawa Ietsuna had died in 1680, and his other uncle, Tokugawa Tsunayoshi succeeded the bakufu, Tsunayoshi's failure to produce a male heir greatly increased the chances of Ienobu becoming shogun. Nonetheless, for the time being, Ienobu was not being groomed to succeed to the shogunate but rather to succeed his father Tsunashige as daimyō of Kōfu.

In 1678 Tokugawa Tsunashige died and Tokugawa Ienobu succeeded him as daimyō of Kōfu. He became very powerful there since his uncle was the shogun.

In 1694, a rōnin, Arai Hakuseki, was appointed as personal tutor and advisor to Ienobu. Hakuseki used to be a teacher in Edo, but was recommended by the philosopher Kinoshita Jun'an to become personal tutor to Ienobu and was summoned to Ienobu's Edo residence. Until 1709, when Ienobu became shōgun, it is thought that Hakuseki gave him 2000 lectures on the Chinese classics and Confucianism. This was helpful to Ienobu since Shogun Tsunayoshi had also been a great patron of the Chinese classics and of Neo-Confucianism. After Ienobu's ascension, Hakuseki devoted the rest of his life to advising Ienobu, even writing a book for him, known as the Hankanpu covering the history of various fiefs from 1600 until 1680.

== Family ==
- Father: Tokugawa Tsunashige
- Mother: Ohara no Kata later Choshoin (1637–1664)
- Adoptive Father: Tokugawa Tsunayoshi
- Wife: Konoe Hiroko (1666–1741) later Ten'ei-in
- concubines:
  - Okiyo no Kata (1685–1752) later Gekkoin
  - Ukon no Kata (1682–1766) later Hoshin-in
  - Osume no Kata (d. 1772) later Renjo-in
  - Oshino no Kata
  - Itsuki no Miya (d. 1710) later Honkoin
- Children:
  - Toyo-hime (1681–1681) by Hiroko
  - Tokugawa Mugetsuin (1699–1699) by Hiroko
  - Tokugawa Iechiyo (1707–1707) by Ukon
  - Tokugawa Daigorō (1708–1710) by Osume
  - Tokugawa Ietsugu by Okiyo
  - Tokugawa Torakichi (1711–1711) by Osume
  - child (died in womb) by Itsuki no Miya
- Adopted:
  - Masahime (1699–1704) daughter of Konoe Iehiro

== Shōgun (1709–1712) ==
In 1709, shōgun Tsunayoshi died without a male heir. In genealogical terms, it would have appeared reasonable for the daimyō of Kōfu, Tokugawa Ienobu, to be elevated to the role of shōgun because he was the only remaining direct lineal descendant of Tokugawa Ieyasu. However, this was a secondary factor in the context of intra-bakufu politics which were carried over from the last days of the Tsunayoshi bakufu. The ultimate resolution of any questions about shogunal succession were probably influenced most effectively by the fact that Ienobu was the expressed preference of the late shōgun Tsunayoshi's wife.

Shogun Ienobu immediately began to reform certain elements of Japanese society. It is often said that he transformed the bakufu from a military to a civilian institution, which was already in the making during the rule of Ietsuna and Tsunayoshi. He started off by abolishing the controversial laws and edicts of Tsunayoshi. The chamberlains, who were given strict power by Tsunayoshi, had all power withdrawn from their hands. Also, in 1710, Shogun Ienobu revised the Buke-Sho-Hatto, where language was improved. Also, censorship was discontinued, and Ienobu told his subordinates that the thoughts and feelings of the populace should reach the high levels of the bakufu. This is thought to be Hakuseki's influence. Cruel punishments and persecutions were discontinued, and the judicial system was also reformed.

However, there was one remnant of shōgun Tsunayoshi's rule which was not done away with. Neo-Confucianism was still popular and patronized, also thanks to Hakuseki's influence, since he had long lectured Ienobu on the Confucian classics. Economic reform also was ensured, and the gold coin was created to stabilize the economy.

Shogun Ienobu was one of the first shōguns in centuries to actually try to significantly improve relations with the emperor and court in Kyoto. In 1711, the Fujiwara regent, Konoe Motohiro, arrived in Edo from Kyoto to be the mediator for talks between shōgun Ienobu and Emperor Nakamikado and his nobles (in Kyoto). Ienobu took the lead, but Motohiro also appears to have asserted himself. After the talks were over, it was decided that younger sons of emperors do not have to enter priesthood and can form new branches of the imperial throne and that their daughters can marry (in fact, one of the younger sisters of Emperor Nakamikado married Shogun Ienobu's younger son, shōgun Ietsugu) and that the bakufu would offer financial grants to the court. Many court ceremonies were also revived. Thus, during the rule of shōgun Ienobu, relations with the court were fairly good.

Shōgun Ienobu died at the age of 51 in Shōtoku 2, on the 14th day of the 10th month (1712). He was succeeded by his infant son, Tokugawa Ietsugu. Ietsugu became the seventh shōgun. He continued to employ Hakuseki as his adviser.

His Buddhist name was Bunshōin (文昭院) and buried in Zōjō-ji.

== Eras of Ienobu's bakufu ==
The years in which Ienobu was shōgun are more specifically identified by more than one era name or nengō.

- Hōei (1704–1711)
- Shōtoku (1711–1716)

== Ancestry ==
Ancestors of Tokugawa Ienobu

8. Tokugawa Hidetada, 2nd Tokugawa Shōgun (1579-1632)
4. Tokugawa Iemitsu, 3rd Tokugawa Shōgun (1604-1651)
9. Oeyo (1573-1626)
2. Tokugawa Tsunashige, daimyō of Kōfu (1644-1678)
10. Okabe Shigeke
5. Junshōin (1622-1683)
1. Tokugawa Ienobu, 6th Tokugawa Shōgun
3. Chōshōin (1637-1664)

== Notes ==
Royal titles
Preceded by Tokugawa Tsunashige	Lord of Kōfu; Tokugawa Ienobu; 1678–1704	Succeeded by Yanagisawa Yoshiyasu
Military offices
Preceded by Tokugawa Tsunayoshi	Shōgun: Tokugawa Ienobu; 1709–1712	Succeeded by Tokugawa Ietsugu
