= Yonekura Masakoto =

Last daimyo of Mutsuura

- 米倉昌言
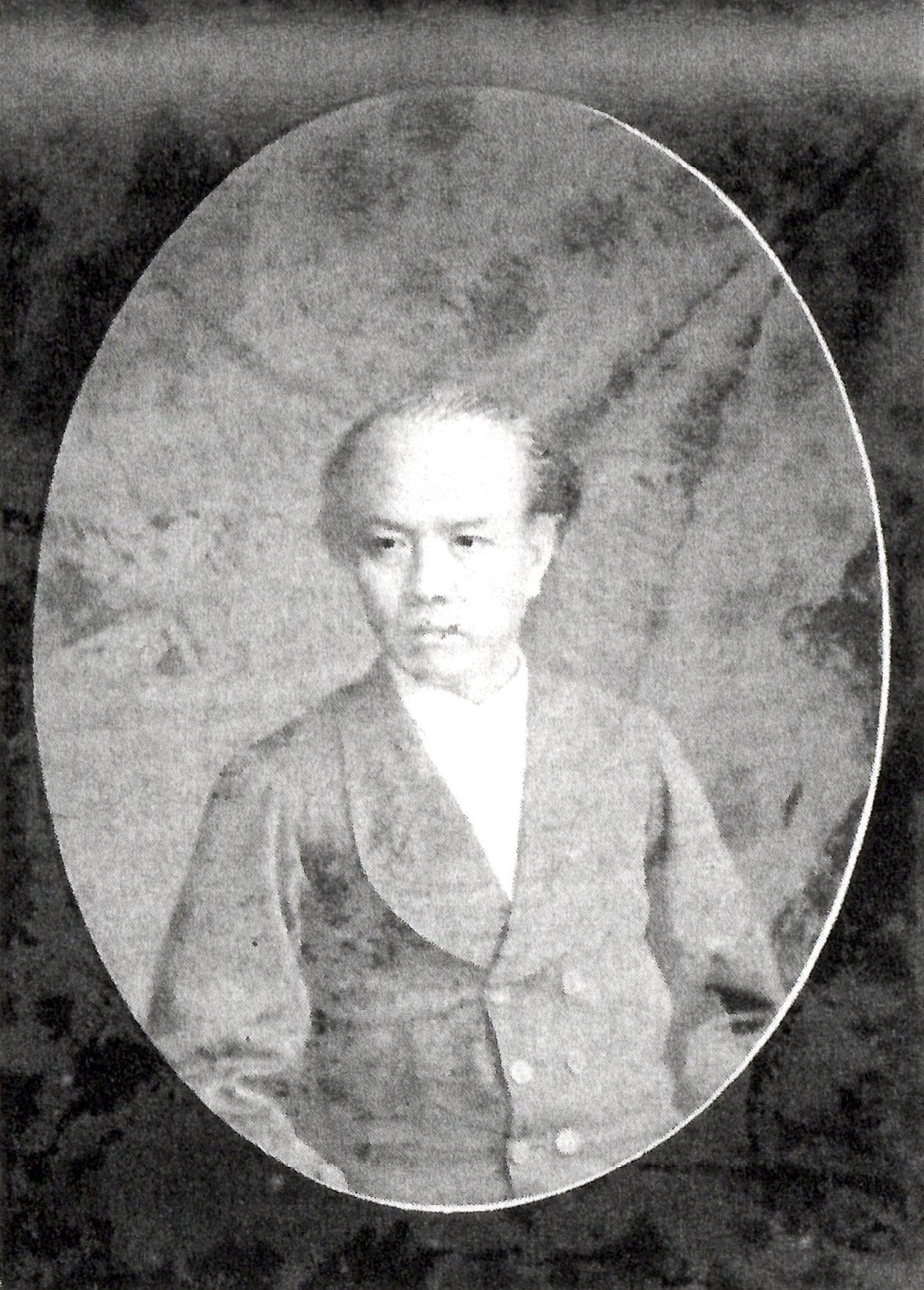
- Born: April 13, 1837; Edo, Japan
- Died: February 27, 1909 (aged 71); Tokyo, Japan
- Other names: Shimotsuke-no-kami; Tango-no-kami
- Occupation: Daimyō

Yonekura Masakoto (米倉昌言; April 13, 1837 – February 27, 1909) was the 8th and final daimyō of Mutsuura Domain in southern Musashi Province, Honshū, Japan (modern-day Kanagawa Prefecture) during the Bakumatsu period.

== Biography ==
Yonekoto Masakoto was the 6th son of the 7th daimyō of Mutsuura Domain, Yonekura Masanaga. In May, 1868, he was presented before Shōgun Tokugawa Iesada in a formal audience and on June 24, 1860, due to his father's retirement due to illness, became the head of the Yonekura clan, and daimyō of Mutsuura Domain. He served in a number of ceremonial posts within the administration of the Tokugawa shogunate, including guard duty at Osaka Castle, and participated in both the First Chōshū expedition and the Second Chōshū expedition. In 1867, he was assigned guard duty over the Yokosuka Naval Arsenal; however in 1868 during the Boshin War of the Meiji Restoration, he capitulated to the Satchō Alliance forces without a struggle. For this reason, he was confirmed as domain governor of Mutsuura in June 1869. He left public service with the abolition of the han system in July 1871.

In 1887, he was ennobled with the title of viscount (shishaku) under the kazoku peerage system.

Yonekura Masakoto was married to a daughter of Suwa Tadamichi, daimyō of the Suwa Domain in Shinano Province .

| Preceded by Yonekura Masanaga | Daimyō of Mutsuura; 1860–1871 | Succeeded by none |
