= Yonekura Masanaga =

Yonekura Masanaga 米倉昌寿
- Born: February 21, 1793
- Died: May 7, 1863 (aged 70); Edo, Japan
- Other names: Tango-no-kami
- Occupation: Daimyō

Yonekura Masanaga (米倉 昌寿; February 21, 1793 – May 7, 1863) was the 7th daimyō of Mutsuura Domain in southern Musashi Province, Honshū, Japan (modern-day Kanazawa-ku, Yokohama, Kanagawa Prefecture) and 10th head of the Yonekura clan. His courtesy title was Tango-no-kami.

== Biography ==
Yonekura Masanaga was born as the 3rd son of Kutsuki Masatsuna, daimyō of Fukuchiyama Domain in Tango Province. In 1812, on the death of the 6th daimyō of Mutsuura Domain (Yonekura Masanori), he was adopted into the Yonekura clan. In June 1812, he was presented before shōgun Tokugawa Ienari and confirmed as the daimyō of Mutsuura.

As daimyō, Yonekura Masanaga was assigned to several ceremonial postings as guard of various gates to Edo Castle. On June 24, 1860, he turned his titles over to his 6th son, Yonekura Masakoto, and went into retirement. He died three years later on May 7, 1863, at the age of 71.

His grave is at the temple of Hase-dera in Shibuya, Tokyo.

Masanaga had six sons and two daughters his official wife, a daughter of Manabe Akihiro, daimyō of Sabae Domain, as well as 2 sons and 2 daughters through a concubine, the daughter of Itakura Katsunaga, daimyō of Fukushima Domain in Mutsu Province

== See also ==
- Yonekura clan

Preceded by Yonekura Masanori	7th Daimyō of Mutsuura; 1812-1860	Succeeded by Yonekura Masakoto
