= Tokugawa Tsunashige =

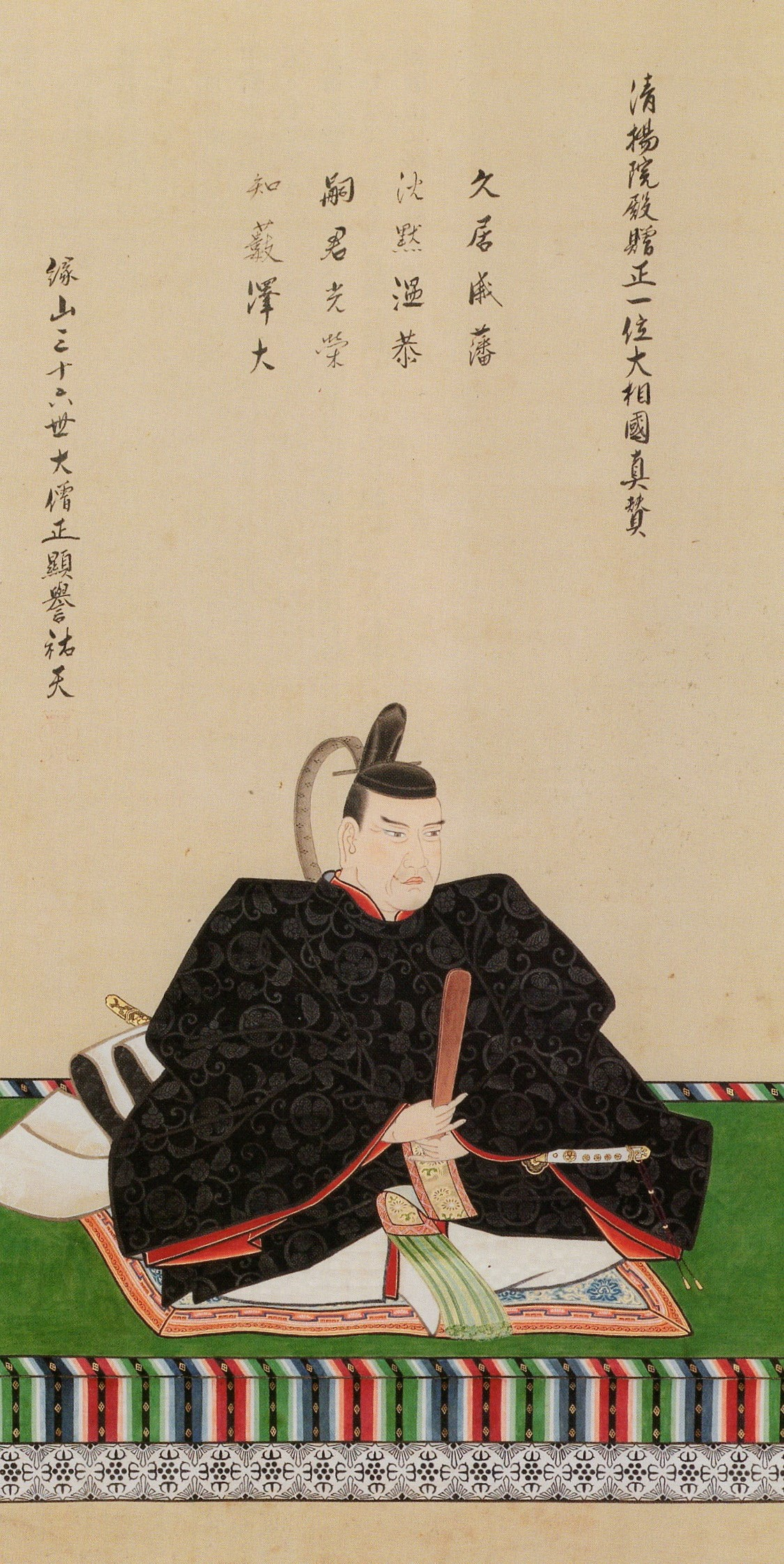
Portrat of Tokugawa Tsunashige

Tokugawa Tsunashige (徳川 綱重; 28 June 1644 – 29 October 1678) was the third son of Tokugawa Iemitsu. His mother was Iemitsu's concubine Onatsu no Kata. His childhood name was Chomatsu (長松). When Iemitsu died in 1651, he was only 8 years old. After he was given Kofu Domain, he remained there until his death in 1678.

== Family ==
- Father: Tokugawa Iemitsu
- Mother: Onatsu no Kata (1622-1683) later Junshōin
- Adopted Mother: Senhime
- Wife: Ryusoin (1648-1669) Daughter of Nijo Mitsuhira
- Concubines:
  - Kogyoku-in (d.1673)
  - Ohara no Kata (1637-1664) later Choshoin
- Sons
  - Tokugawa Tsunatoyo by Choshoin
  - Matsudaira Kiyotake (1663-1724) by Choshoin

== Ancestry ==
Ancestors of Tokugawa Tsunashige

16. Matsudaira Hirotada (1526–1549)
8. Tokugawa Ieyasu, 1st Tokugawa Shōgun (1543-1616)
17. O-dainokata (1528–1602)
4. Tokugawa Hidetada, 2nd Tokugawa Shōgun (1579-1632)
18. Tozuka Tadaharu
9. Lady Saigō (1552-1589)
19. Saigō
2. Tokugawa Iemitsu, 3rd Tokugawa Shōgun (1604-1651)
20. Azai Hisamasa (1526-1573)
10. Azai Nagamasa (1545-1573)
21. Iguchi Ono (1527-1573)
5. Oeyo (1573-1626)
22. Oda Nobuhide (1511-1552)
11. Oichi (1547-1583)
23. Dota Gozen (?-1594)
1. Tokugawa Tsunashige, daimyō of Kōfu
6. Okabe Shigeke
3. Junshōin (1622-1683)

Preceded by Tokugawa Tadanaga	Lord of Kofu; 1661-1678	Succeeded by Tokugawa Tsunatoyo
