= Ogimachi Machiko =

Japanese writer (1675–1724)

Ōgimachi Machiko (正親町町子, 1675 - 1724) was a Japanese noble lady, scholar, member of the Ōgimachi family of court nobles during the Edo period. She is known for her diary, Matsukage no nikki, which details numerous events of that period in a writing style inspired by the Tale of Genji.

== Life ==
Machiko was the daughter of the Major Counsellor (dainagon) of the Emperor of Japan, Ogimachi Sanetoyo. She was also the younger sister of a notable Shinto scholar, Ogimachi Kimmichi. She received the highest education as an aristocrat of the privileged class. She learned the arts considered essential for the nobles of the Imperial court, including the arts of calligraphy, waka poetry. Her family traced their line to the celebrated classical scholar Sanjônishi Sanetaka (1455-1537).

At the age of sixteen, Machiko became the second concubine of Yanagisawa Yoshiyasu, who became the protégé of the fifth Tokugawa shogun Tokugawa Tsunayoshi. She would bear his fourth and fifth children. They lived in Tokyo's Rikugien Garden within the Komagome district, which she called the garden of the six styles, and where she would write her memoir.

== Notable works ==
Machiko wrote the Matsukage nikki (Diary in the Shade of a Pine Tree), a record of the period of 1685–1709, after her husband retired from the shogun's service. Consisting of four kan, it is modelled on the Eiga Monogatari and just as this monogatari gives an account of the magnificence of Fujiwara no Michinaga, Machiko's diary gives a detailed account of Yoshiyasu's glory during this period. The characteristic of the work is the typically female power of observation. More than 36 hand-copied manuscripts survive to the present day. An English translation appeared in 2021.

Machiko was also famed for her analysis of Japanese and Chinese poetry, and her own compositions. Some of her works were lauded by the emperor Reigen (ruled 1663–1687), who was considered a skilled poet himself and who asked for them to be placed in the royal archives.
