= Kōfu Domain =

Japanese feudal domain

Kōfu Domain (甲府藩, Kōfu-han) was a feudal domain under the Tokugawa shogunate of Edo period Japan. The domain was centered at Kōfu Castle what is now the city of Kōfu, Yamanashi.

== History ==
Kai Province was initially entrusted to important Tokugawa clan members as Kōfu Domain, and later to the highly placed fudai daimyō Yanagisawa clan, with periods of direct shogunal rule ( tenryō ) in between. Following the transfer of Yanagisawa Yoshisato to Yamato Province in 1724, the domain remained under direct shogunal control until the Meiji Restoration.

With the abolition of the han system in July 1871, Kōfu Domain became “Kōfu Prefecture”, which subsequently was renamed Yamanashi Prefecture.

== List of daimyō ==
#	Name	Tenure	Courtesy title	Court Rank	kokudaka	Notes
Tokugawa clan, 1603-1704 (shinpan)
1	Tokugawa Yoshinao (徳川義直)	1603–1607	Uhōe-no-kami (右兵衛督)	Lower 4th (従四位下)	250,000 koku	9th son of Tokugawa Ieyasu
2	Tokugawa Tadanaga (徳川忠長)	1618–1624	Gon-Chūnagon (権中納言)	Third (従三位)	238,000 koku	3rd son of Tokugawa Hidetada
3	Tokugawa Tsunashige (徳川綱重)	1661–1678	Sangi (参議)	3rd (従三位)	250,000->350,000 koku	3rd son of Tokugawa Iemitsu
4	Tokugawa Tsunatoyo (徳川綱豊)	1678–1704	Gon-Chūnagon (権中納言)	3rd (従三位)	350,000 koku	1st son of Tokugawa Tsunashige became 6th Shōgun, Tokugawa Ienobu
Yanagisawa clan, 1704-1724 (fudai)
1	Yanagisawa Yoshiyasu (柳沢吉保)	1704–1709	Mino-no-kami (美濃守); Sakonoe-shoshō (左権少将)	Lower 4th (従四位下)	150,000 koku	transfer from Kawagoe Domain
2	Yanagisawa Yoshisato (柳沢吉里)	1709–1724	Kai-no-kami(甲斐守); Jijū (侍従)	3rd (従三位)	150,000 koku	Eldest son of Yanagisawa Yoshiyasu transferred to Kōriyama Domain
Tokugawa clan, 1724-1871(tenryō)						

== See also ==
- List of Han
