= Yanagisawa Yoshiyasu =

Japanese samurai

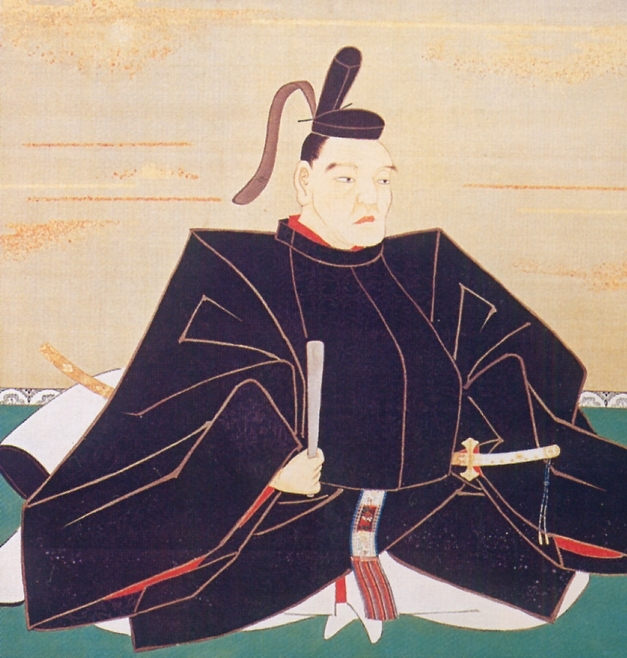
Yanagisawa Yoshiyasu

Yotsu-hanabishi or Yanagisawa's Hanabishi, the emblem of the Yanagisawa clan

Yanagisawa Yoshiyasu (Japanese: 柳沢 吉保; December 31, 1658 – December 8, 1714) was a Japanese samurai and daimyo of the Edo period. He was an official in the Tokugawa shogunate and a favourite of the fifth shōgun, Tokugawa Tsunayoshi. His second concubine was Ogimachi Machiko, a writer and scholar from the noble court who wrote monogatari.

== Career ==
The Yanagisawa house traced descent to the "Kai-Genji," the branch of the Minamoto clan which had been enfeoffed with the province of Kai in the eleventh century.

Yoshiyasu served Tsunayoshi from an early age, becoming his Wakashū and eventually rose to the position of soba yōnin. He was the daimyō of the Kawagoe han, and later of the Kōfu han in Kai Province. This appointment was a signature honour as it has been the fief held by Tsunayoshi before becoming shōgun, and of Ienobu, his heir apparent, as well as having an historic familial connection; he retired in 1709. Having previously been named Yasuakira, he received a kanji from the name of the shōgun, and came to call himself Yoshiyasu. He built Rikugien Garden, a traditional Japanese garden, in 1695. He had an adopted son named Yanagisawa Yoshisato by Tokugawa Tsunayoshi with Yoshiyasu's concubine, Sumeko.

According to the Sanno gaiki, Yanagisawa was a lover of the shōgun, Tokugawa Tsunayoshi, who was reported to have had many relationships with men, and numerous male favourites.

Yanagisawa played a pivotal role in the matter of the forty-seven rōnin.

He was noted for his patronage of a number of scholars, officials, and religious figures, as well as for his own scholarly interests. For instance, he was an early employer and supporter of the influential Confucian scholar Ogyū Sorai.

Yanagisawa was highly interested in Buddhism, inviting Buddhist monks into his home to teach him. As part of his desire to learn, he studied the Chinese language.

== Cultural references ==
Yanagisawa is the subject of the diary memoir of his concubine Ōgimachi Machiko (正親町町子, 1675 - 1724), Matsukage no nikki ('In the Shelter of the Pine'), which gives a detailed account of Yoshiyasu's glory during the period 1685-1709. It is modelled on the Eiga Monogatari and written in a style inspired by The Tale of Genji. More than 36 hand-copied manuscripts survive to the present day. An English translation appeared in 2021.

Yanagisawa appears as a character in most of the novels by American mystery writer Laura Joh Rowland set in Genroku-era Japan as the antagonist to the books' main character Sano Ichiro. Rowland's chronology differs from history by having Yanagisawa exiled in disgrace in 1694 and being replaced by Sano as Tsunayoshi's chief advisor, only to return from exile later in the series. Other details of Yanagisawa's life, however, are portrayed fairly accurately, including his relationship to the shōgun.

== See also ==
- Samurai
- Shudō

== Notes ==
Preceded by Matsudaira Nobuteru	1st Lord of Kawagoe (Yanagisawa); 1694–1704	Succeeded by Akimoto Takatomo
Preceded by Tokugawa Tsunatoyo	1st Lord of Kōfu (Yanagisawa); 1704–1709	Succeeded by Yanagisawa Yoshisato
