= Yonekura clan =

Yonekura 米倉
- Yonekura family crest
- Home province: Kai Province
- Parent house: Minamoto clan (Seiwa Genji); Takeda clan
- Titles: Various
- Founder: Yonekura Nobutsugu
- Final ruler: Yonekura Masakoto
- Founding year: 12th century
- Ruled until: 1873 (Abolition of the han system)

The Yonekura clan (米倉氏, Yonekura-shi) was a cadet branch of the Takeda clan of Kai Province, some members of whom rose to positions of importance within the administration of the Tokugawa shogunate in mid-Edo period Japan.

According to the genealogy of the Takeda clan, Yonekura Nobutsugu descended from Minamoto no Kiyomitsu, also called Takeda Kiyomitsu. In the late Heian period, he settled in Koiwasuji Yonekura, Yatsushiro district, Kai Province and called himself 'Yonekura'.

According to "Koyo Gunkan" (record of the military exploits of the Takeda family), Yonekura Shigetsugu was the 'Ashigaru Taisho' (General of the Foot Soldiers), and he died at the Battle of Nagashino in 1575.

Yonekura Harutsugu was the eldest son of Shigetsugu. He was given the character of 'Haru' by Takeda Harunobu (Shingen). On April 28, 1569, he died at the second Battle of Satta Toge.

Yonekura Tadatsugu succeeded the family estate after the death of his elder brother Harutsugu. He was the leader of the Mukawashu warriors troop. When the Takeda clan was destroyed in 1582, Oda Nobunaga prohibited the former retainers of the Takeda clan from being employed by him, so he hid his younger brothers in Kiriyama, Totomi Province on the advice of Tokugawa Ieyasu. In the same year, when the Tenshojingo War broke out, he was recruited by Tokugawa Ieyasu, and played an active role in the battle against the Hojo clan. In 1584, he received a property in Kai province, and after the Battle of Ueda (1585) he was given additional properties, and in 1590, he was transferred to Hachigata (Musashi Province).

Yonekura Yoshitsugu died at the Siege of Osaka.

Yonekura Masatada (米倉昌尹) (1637–1699) was favored by Shōgun Tokugawa Tsunayoshi, and rose rapidly through the ranks until he reached the post of Wakadoshiyori in 1696. The additional revenues provided by this office qualified him to join ranks of the Daimyō, and he became the first lord of Kanazawa Domain in Musashi Province. He was subsequently transferred to Minagawa Domain in Kōzuke Province. His line died out with his grandson Yonekura Masateru (米倉昌照) (1683-1712), but a son of his relative Yanagisawa Yoshiyasu, descending from the Takeda and the Mukawashu, was selected to inherit the family name, taking the name Yonekura Tadasuke and was transferred back to Musashi-Kanazawa Domain in 1722.

During the Bakumatsu period, the 8th (and final) Daimyō, Yonekura Masakoto, sided with the new Meiji government in the Boshin War of the Meiji Restoration. After the abolition of the han system, he became a viscount (shishaku) under the kazoku peerage system.
