= Mizoguchi Naotoki =

Mizoguchi Naotoki 溝口直侯
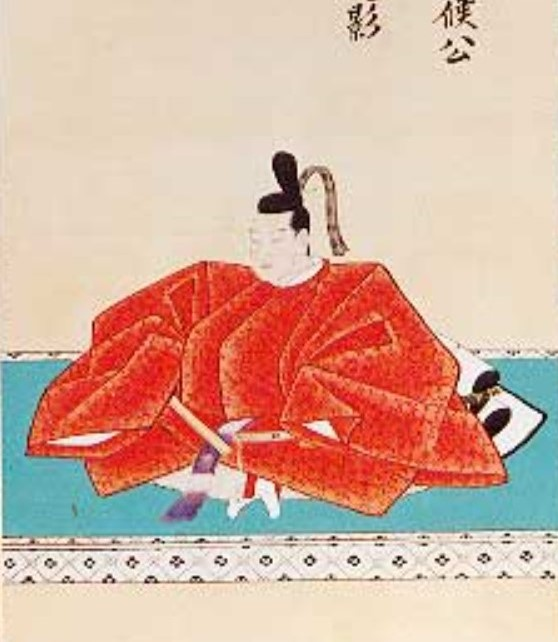
- Mizoguchi Naotoki
- Born: June 11, 1778
- Died: September 25, 1802 (aged 24); Edo, Musashi Province, Japan
- Occupation: Daimyō of Shibata Domain (1786-1802)
- Predecessor: Mizoguchi Naoyasu
- Successor: Mizoguchi Naoaki
- Father: Mizoguchi Naoyasu

Mizoguchi Naotoki (溝口直侯; June 11, 1778 – September 25, 1802) was the 9th daimyō of Shibata Domain in Echigo Province, Japan (modern-day Niigata Prefecture). His courtesy title was Izumo-no-kami, and his Court rank was Junior Fifth Rank, Lower Grade.

== Biography ==
Mizoguchi Naotoki was the grandson of Mizoguchi Naoatsu and was adopted by his uncle Mizoguchi Naoyasu as his successor in 1786. His mother was a daughter of Matsudaira Tadachika of Tatebayashi Domain. Due to his youth, Naoyasu continued to rue the domain from retirement. He was received in formal audience by Shōgun Tokugawa Ienari in 1788. However, in 1789, the domain was ordered to exchange 20,000 koku of its territories in Echigo Province with an equivalent kokudaka of territory scattered widely across three districts of Mutsu Province. Although the nominal kokudaka was the same, this discontiguous territories were remote, unimproved and this order was thus a tremendous financial burden on the domain. Naotoki died in Edo in 1802 at the age of 26. His grave is at the temple of Kisshō-ji in Tokyo.

Naoyasu was married to a daughter of Sagawa Nagahiro of Hitoyoshi Domain, and had 2 sons and 1 daughter.

== See also ==
- Mizoguchi clan

Preceded by Mizoguchi Naoyasu	9th Daimyō of Shibata; 1786-1802	Succeeded by Mizoguchi Naoaki
