= Mizoguchi Shigekatsu =

Mizoguchi Shigekatsu 溝口重雄
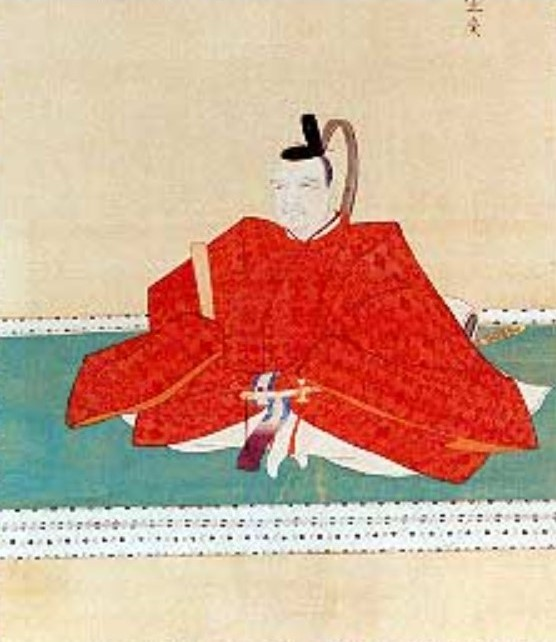
- Mizoguchi Shigekatsu
- Born: August 14, 1633
- Died: October 17, 1708 (aged 75); Edo, Musashi Province, Japan
- Occupation: Daimyō of Shibata Domain (1672–1706)
- Predecessor: Mizoguchi Nobunao
- Successor: Mizoguchi Shigekatsu
- Father: Mizoguchi Nobunao

Mizoguchi Shigekatsu (溝口重雄; August 14, 1633 – October 17, 1708) was the 4th daimyō of Shibata Domain in Echigo Province, Japan (modern-day Niigata Prefecture). His courtesy title was Shinano-no-kami, and his Court rank was Junior Fifth Rank, Lower Grade.

== Biography ==
Mizoguchi Shigekatsu was the eldest son of Mizoguchi Nobunao. He was received in formal audience by Shogun Tokugawa Iemitsu in 1640 and became daimyō in 1672 on the retirement of his father. In 1681 he was ordered to take possession of Takada Castle after the dispossession of Matsudaira Mitsunaga from Takada Domain, and in 1699 was ordered to oversee the construction of a new moat for Edo Castle in the Azabu area of the city. During his tenure at Shibata, Shigekatsu was noted as a patron of the arts, especially that of the Japanese tea ceremony. He completed the Shimizu-en gardens begun by his father.

He retired in 1706 and died in Edo in 1709. His grave is at the temple of Kisshō-ji in Tokyo.

Shigekatsu was married to a daughter of Matsudaira Masatsuna of Tamanawa Domain, and after her death remarried to a daughter of Sakai Tadakatsu of Obama Domain. He had 4 sons and 7 daughters.

== See also ==
- Mizoguchi clan

Preceded by Mizoguchi Nobunao	4th Daimyō of Shibata; 1672–1706	Succeeded by Mizoguchi Shigemoto
