= Mizoguchi Naohiro =

Mizoguchi Naohiro 溝口直溥
- Born: January 27, 1819
- Died: April 26, 1874 (aged 55); Edo, Musashi Province, Japan
- Occupation: Daimyō of Shibata Domain (1838-1867)
- Predecessor: Mizoguchi Naoaki
- Successor: Mizoguchi Naomasa
- Father: Mizoguchi Naoaki

Mizoguchi Naohiro (溝口直溥; January 27, 1819 – April 26, 1874) was the 11th daimyō of Shibata Domain in Echigo Province, Japan (modern-day Niigata Prefecture). His courtesy title was Shūzen-no-kami, and his Court rank was Junior Fourth Rank, Lower Grade.

== Biography ==
Mizoguchi Naohiro was the eldest son of Mizoguchi Naoaki and was born in Shibata to a concubine. He was called to Edo in 1825 and raised by Naoaki's official wife. He was received in formal audience by Shōgun Tokugawa Ienari in 1832, and became daimyō in 1838 on his father's retirement. In 1842, the shogunate called upon Shibata to repair the shogun mausoleum at Nikko. In 1860, the domain's duties with regards to the defense of Sado island were removed, and he was assigned to bolster the defenses of the Echigo coastline instead. His official kokudaka was also increased to 100,000 koku. In 1861, he was appointed one of the escorts for the trip by Princess Kazunomiya to Edo for her wedding to Shōgun Tokugawa Iemochi. His court rank was raised to Junior Fourth Rank, Lower Grade. The following year, he was in the entourage of Shogun Tokugawa Iemochi's trip to Kyoto and was received in audience by Emperor Kōmei. He also constructed a residence in Kyoto. In 1863, the domain's responsibility over the Echigo coastline was rescinded, but he was assigned to act as regent over Takada Domain and his duties regarding the protection Sado Island were revived. During the Mito rebellion of 1864, he was ordered to dispatch troops to Shimotsuke Province. In 1866, he was recalled to Kyoto to provide guard duty. In 1867, he officially retired in favor of his son and in 1868 returned to Shibata, where he took the tonsure. In 1870, he returned to Tokyo, where he died in 1874. His grave is at the temple of Kisshō-ji in Tokyo.

Naohiro was married to a daughter of Matsudaira Yasutō of Hamada Domain, and after her death, remarried to a daughter of Tsuchiya Yoshioki of Tsuchiura Domain. He had a total of 16 sons and 15 daughters, most of whom died in childhood.

== See also ==
- Mizoguchi clan

Preceded by Mizoguchi Naoaki	11th Daimyō of Shibata; 1838-1867	Succeeded by Mizoguchi Naomasa
