= Mizoguchi Naoaki =

Japanese daimyō (1799–1858)

Mizoguchi Naoaki 溝口直諒
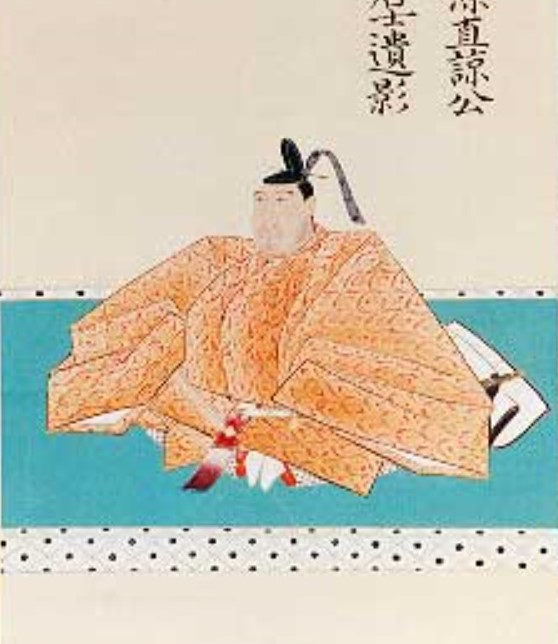
- Mizoguchi Naoaki
- Born: February 12, 1799
- Died: July 28, 1858 (aged 59); Edo, Musashi Province, Japan
- Occupation: Daimyō of Shibata Domain (1802-1838)
- Predecessor: Mizoguchi Naotoki
- Successor: Mizoguchi Naohiro
- Father: Mizoguchi Naotoki

Mizoguchi Naoaki (溝口直諒; February 12, 1799 – July 28, 1858) was the 10th daimyō of Shibata Domain in Echigo Province, Japan (modern-day Niigata Prefecture). His courtesy title was Hōki-no-kami, and his Court rank was Junior Fifth Rank, Lower Grade.

== Biography ==
Mizoguchi Naoaki was the eldest son of Mizoguchi Naotoki and became daimyō at the age of four on his father's death. Due to his youth, the rōjū Matsudaira Nobuakira of Yoshida Domain served as regent until 1813. This was the same person who had earlier punished the domain by transferring 20,000 koku of its holdings in Echigo Province to a scattering of holdings in Mutsu Province. Naoaki was received in formal audience by Shōgun Tokugawa Ienari in 1814. In 1808, the domain was ordered to dispatch persons with knowledge of artillery to Sado Island to strengthen the defenses of that island against incursions by foreign ships, and the domain was ordered to send reinforcements to Sado in 1810. Once Naoaki took control of the domain, he revived his predecessors fiscal austerity programmes; however, due to a fire which burned down much of the Shibata jōkamachi, the Sanjō earthquake and the Tenpō famine, he was not able to make much progress in reforming the financial situation of the domain. However, in 1823, the domain received 8000 koku of former tenryō lands in Echigo Province, and a further 2000 koku in 1828 and 1830 in exchange for the 13,000 koku of holdings scattered across Mutsu.

In 1838, Naoaki retired, and lived in Edo to his death in 1858. In his retirement, he establish a school in Tokyo and wrote several works on various topics including education, maritime defense and the theory of labor. He was also a practitioner of the Japanese tea ceremony. His grave is at the temple of Kisshō-ji in Tokyo.

Naoaki was married to a daughter of Asano Narikata of Hiroshima Domain, and after her death, remarried to her younger sister. He had a total of 12 sons and 15 daughters.

== See also ==
- Mizoguchi clan

Preceded by Mizoguchi Naotoki	10th Daimyō of Shibata; 1802-1838	Succeeded by Mizoguchi Naohiro
