= Mizoguchi Naomasa =

Japanese daimyō

Mizoguchi Naomasa 溝口直正
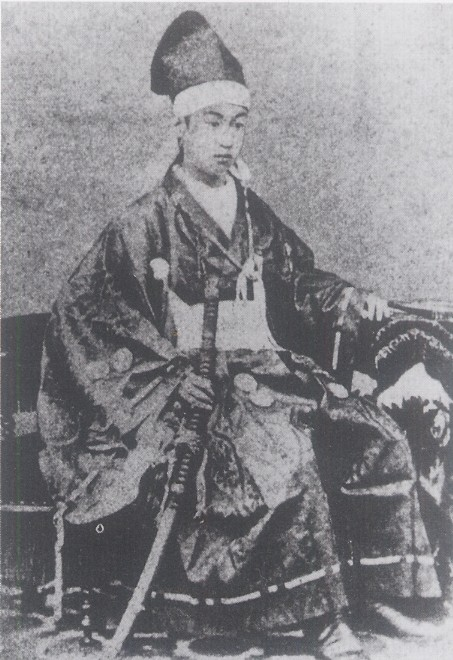
- Mizoguchi Naomasa
- Born: April 11, 1855; Shibata, Echigo Province, Japan
- Died: October 17, 1919 (aged 64); Edo, Musashi Province, Japan
- Occupation: Daimyō of Shibata Domain (1868-1871)
- Predecessor: Mizoguchi Naohiro
- Father: Mizoguchi Naohiro

Mizoguchi Naomasa (溝口直正; April 11, 1855 – October 17, 1919) was the 12th (and final) daimyō of Shibata Domain in Echigo Province, Japan (modern-day Niigata Prefecture). His courtesy title was Hōki-no-kami, and his Court rank was Junior Fifth Rank, Lower Grade.

== Biography ==
Mizoguchi Naomasa was the fourth son of Mizoguchi Naohiro and was born in Shibata to a concubine, and became daimyō in 1867 on his father's retirement. That year, all of the daimyō were called to Kyoto by Shōgun Tokugawa Yoshinobu, but due to his youth, he sent the karō of the domain in his place. In 1868, the shogunate called upon Shibata to contribute to the defense of Kyoto against the threat of the Satchō Alliance, but after a few months ordered its forces withdrawn to bolster the defenses of Edo. Naomasa travelled from Shibata to Edo, and later that year Shibata joined the Ōuetsu Reppan Dōmei. Shibata was unable to make any military contribution to the alliance due an uprising of the peasantry. Yonezawa Domain dispatched troops to Shibata and attempted to take Mizoguchi Naomasa hostage to ensure the domain's cooperation to the Alliance, but the effort failed due to strong local opposition. Enough of the domain's troops joined the Alliance to prevent a further attack; however, these actions prompted Naomasa to immediately defect to the Imperial forces when they landed at Kashiwazaki, and Shibata Castle subsequently became a stronghold for government forces against the Alliance for the remainder of the Boshin War

In 1868, Naomasa was received in audience by Emperor Meiji, and from 1869 to 1871 served as imperial governor of Shibata under the new Meiji government. In 1884, his court rank was increased to Junior Fourth Rank and he became a Count (Hakushaku) in the new kazoku peerage. He retired in 1919 and died in Tokyo the same year. He was posthumously promoted to Junior Second Rank. His grave is at the temple of Kisshō-ji in Tokyo.

Naohiro was married to a daughter of Wakebe Mitsusada of Ōmizo Domain, and after her death, remarried to a daughter of Tsuchiya Yoshioki of Tsuchiura Domain. He had a total of 10 sons and at least two daughters.

== See also ==
- Mizoguchi clan

Preceded by Mizoguchi Naohiro	12th Daimyō of Shibata; 1868-1871	Succeeded by -none-
