= Mizoguchi Nobukatsu =

- 溝口 宣勝
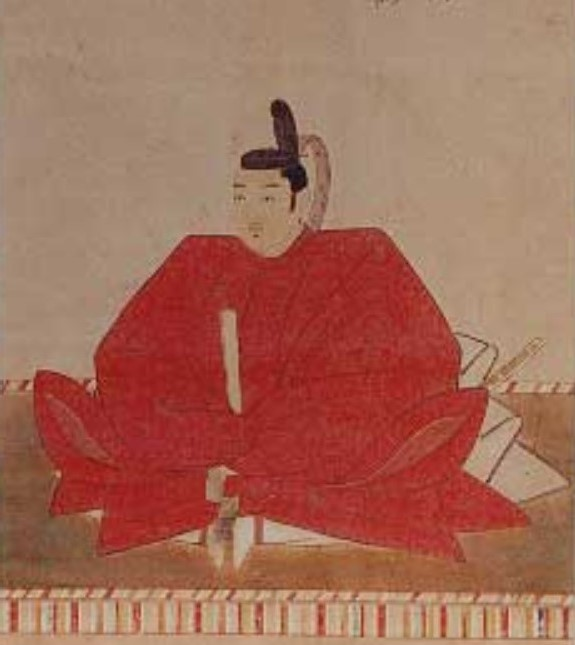
- Preceded by: Mizoguchi Hidekatsu
- Succeeded by: Mizoguchi Nobunao

Personal details
- Born: 1582 Takahama, Wakasa Province, Japan
- Died: November 24, 1628 (aged 45–46) Edo, Musashi Province, Japan
- Parent: Mizoguchi Hidekatsu (father)
- Occupation: Daimyō of Shibata Domain (1610–1628)

Mizoguchi Nobukatsu (溝口 宣勝; 1582 – November 24, 1628) was a Sengoku period samurai and the 2nd daimyō of Shibata Domain in early Edo period Echigo Province, Japan (modern-day Niigata Prefecture). His courtesy title was Hōki-no-kami, and his Court rank was Junior Fifth Rank, Lower Grade.

== Biography ==
Mizoguchi Nobukatsu was the eldest son of Mizoguchi Hidekatsu and was born in Takahama Wakasa Province, in what is now part of the modern city of Takahama, Fukui. His childhood name was Hisasaburō (久三郎), but he changed it to Hidenobu (秀信) after he entered into the service of Toyotomi Hideyoshi in 1597. During the Battle of Sekigahara, the Mizoguchi clan sided with the eastern army of Tokugawa Ieyasu, but remained in Shibata as there were still many supporters of the pro-Toyotomi Uesugi clan in the province. After the establishment of the Tokugawa shogunate, the clan was confirmed in its holding of Shibata Domain.

He became daimyō of Shibata in 1610 on the death of his father. Shortly afterwards, he divided the domain by giving 12,000 koku to his younger brother, Mizuguchi Yoshikatsu, for the creation of a cadet house, Sōmei Domain. The domain was reduced from 60,000 koku to 50,000 koku with 2000 koku coming from new rice lands. Yoshikatsu already had 5000 koku which he had received from his father directly, but returned these lands to Nobukatsu, as his elder brother would have more expenses in his duties to the shogunate while serving in Edo. Nobukatsu made much efforts in increasing the rice production of his domain, and although he increased the kokudaka by 15,000 koku, he gave all of these new lands to sons of his younger brothers, keeping Shibata Domain itself at 50,000 koku. During the 1615 Siege of Osaka, he was assigned to the guard of Matsudaira Tadateru.

He died in Edo in 1628, and his grave is at the temple of Kisshō-ji in Edo, which subsequently became the clan's mortuary temple in Edo.

Nobukatsu was married to a daughter of Hori Hidemasa had 4 sons and 3 daughters.

== See also ==
- Mizoguchi clan

Preceded by Mizoguchi Hidekatsu	2nd Daimyō of Shibata; 1539–1610	Succeeded by Mizoguchi Nobunao
