= Mizoguchi Shigemoto =

Mizoguchi Shigemoto 溝口重元
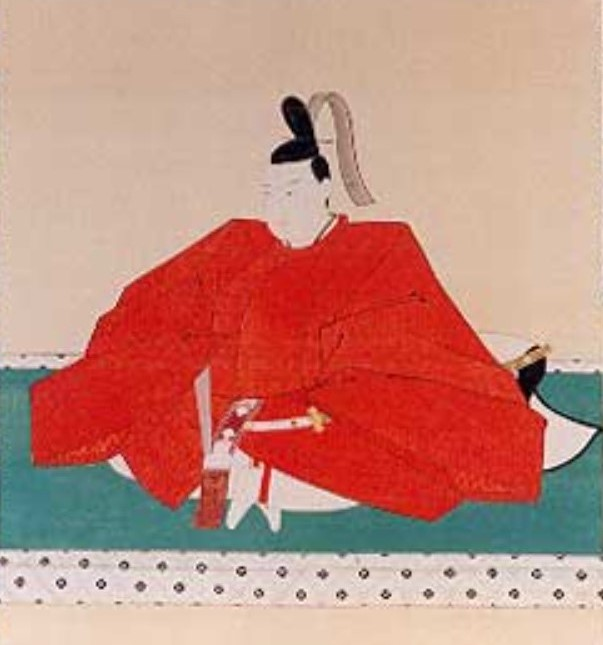
- Mizoguchi Shigemoto
- Born: August 14, 1633; Shibata, Echigo Province, Japan
- Died: January 11, 1719 (aged 38); Edo, Musashi Province, Japan
- Occupation: Daimyō of Shibata Domain (1706-1719)
- Predecessor: Mizoguchi Shigekatsu
- Successor: Mizoguchi Shigekatsu
- Father: Mizoguchi Shigekatsu

Mizoguchi Shigemoto (溝口重元; November 14, 1680 – January 11, 1719) was the 5th daimyō of Shibata Domain in Echigo Province, Japan (modern-day Niigata Prefecture). His courtesy title was Hōki-no-kami, and his Court rank was Junior Fifth Rank, Lower Grade.

== Biography ==
Mizoguchi Shigemoto was the eldest son of Mizoguchi Shigekatsu and was born in Shibata. He was received in a formal audience by Shōgun Tokugawa Tsunayoshi in 1694 and became daimyō in 1706 on the retirement of his father. He encouraged the development of scholarship and martial arts in the domain, and invited disciples of the noted Confucian philosopher and educator Itō Jinsai to the domain in 1715.

He died in Edo in 1719 at the age of 39. His grave is at the temple of Kisshō-ji in Tokyo.

Shigemoto was married to a daughter of Maida Toshiaki of Daishōji Domain, and after her death remarried Masa, the daughter of the kuge Nakanoin Michiomi. He had 2 sons and 1 daughter; however, his eldest son and daughter both died in childhood.

== See also ==
- Mizoguchi clan

Preceded by Mizoguchi Shigekatsu	5th Daimyō of Shibata; 1706-1719	Succeeded by Mizoguchi Naoharu
