= Mizoguchi Naoyasu =

Mizoguchi Naoyasu 溝口直養
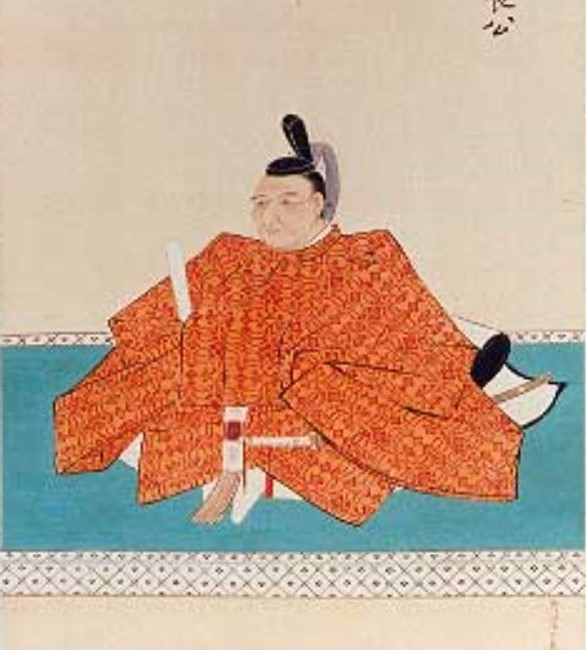
- Mizoguchi Naoyasu
- Born: December 24, 1736
- Died: August 18, 1797 (aged 60); Edo, Musashi Province, Japan
- Occupation: Daimyō of Shibata Domain (1761-1786)
- Predecessor: Mizoguchi Naoatsu
- Successor: Mizoguchi Naotoki
- Father: Mizoguchi Naoatsu

Mizoguchi Naoyasu (溝口直養; December 24, 1736 – August 18, 1797) was the 8th daimyō of Shibata Domain in Echigo Province, Japan (modern-day Niigata Prefecture). His courtesy title was Shūzen-no-kami, and his Court rank was Junior Fifth Rank, Lower Grade.

== Biography ==
Mizoguchi Naoyasu was the illegitimate son of Mizoguchi Naoatsu and was thus initially excluded from the succession. However, after his elder brother fell ill, he was legitimized and made heir in 1760. The same year he was received in formal audience by Shōgun Tokugawa Ieharu, and became daimyō in 1761 on the retirement of his father. As a youth, he was raised in comparative freedom and devoted much of his time to scholarship, especially under the Neo-Confucianism scholars Inaba Usai and Yamazaki Ansai. As daimyō he attempted to put these theories into practice, imposing a strict fiscal reform over all opposition, cutting back severely on expenses and managed to repay a portion of the domain's huge outstanding debt. On the other hand, the relieve growing unrest over high taxation, he also conducted land surveys, established warehouses for rural famine relief and continued flood control projects. He also established a han school in 1772, but ordered that traveling lecture tours be made to various towns and villages to encourage education of the common people. He established a medical school in the domain and a free clinic for poor people. On the other hand, Naoyasu had an affair with a Nihonbashi geisha and even commission the noted bijinga Ukiyoe artist Kitao Shigemasa to make a painting of her, since his position would not allow him to visit her very often.

The policy of exchanging territories with the Shogunate, as was conducted by his father, was continued. In 1764, the domain exchanged 34 villages with a kokudaka of 19,700 koku for 43 other villages from the tenryo territories. Another exchange of 39 villages of 11,500 koku for 33 other villages followed the next year. In 1764, the domain was ordered to assist the Korean embassy to Japan during its stay ate Kanagawa-juku on the Tōkaidō and in 1777 was ordered to assist the shogunate in flood control projects in Kai Province. Naoyasu retired in 1786, citing ill health, but continued to control the domain behind-the-scenes to his death in Edo in 1797. His grave is at the temple of Kisshō-ji in Tokyo.

Naoyasu had no official wife, but through a number of concubines and through adoption had 4 sons and 9 daughters.

== See also ==
- Mizoguchi clan

Preceded by Mizoguchi Naoatsu	8th Daimyō of Shibata; 1761-1786	Succeeded by Mizoguchi Naotoki
