= Mizoguchi Naoharu =

6th Daimyō of Shibata Domain, Echigo Province, Japan

Mizoguchi Naoharu 溝口直治
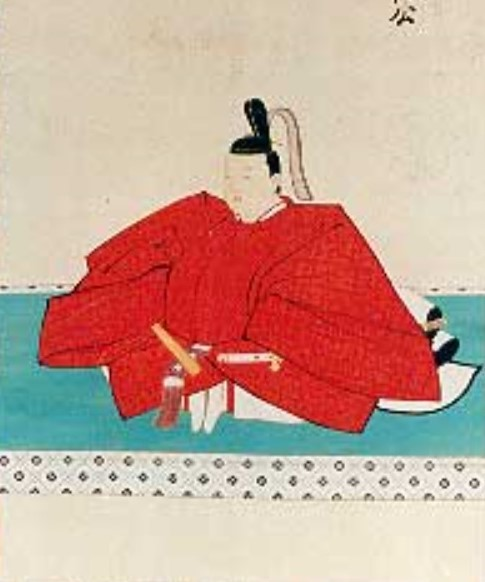
- Mizoguchi Naoharu
- Born: August 23, 1708
- Died: July 7, 1732 (aged 23); Edo, Musashi Province, Japan
- Occupation: Daimyō of Shibata Domain (1719-1732)
- Predecessor: Mizoguchi Shigemoto
- Successor: Mizoguchi Naoatsu
- Father: Mizoguchi Shigemoto

Mizoguchi Naoharu (溝口直治; August 23, 1708 – July 7, 1732) was the 6th daimyō of Shibata Domain in Echigo Province, Japan (modern-day Niigata Prefecture). His courtesy title was Shinano-no-kami, and his Court rank was Junior Fifth Rank, Lower Grade.

== Biography ==
Mizoguchi Naoharu was the second son of Mizoguchi Shigemoto and was born in Shibata. He was received in formal audience by Shōgun Tokugawa Tsunayoshi in 1694 and became daimyō in 1719 on the death of his father. In 1724, he was entrusted with the administration of 43,000 koku of tenryō lands in Echigo Province, and another 20,000 koku in 1729. Despite this addition income, the domain was unable to free itself from debt due to repeated flood disasters, and was forced to terminate the employment of some low-level samurai and to reduce the stipends of others. Naoharu died in Edo in 1732 at the age of 23. His grave is at the temple of Kisshō-ji in Tokyo.

Naoharu was engaged to a daughter of Sakakibara Masakuni of Himeji Domain, but fell ill before the marriage was finalized and the engagement was cancelled. As he died without heir, the domain quickly adopted Kamenosuke, the son of a hatamoto cadet branch of the clan as heir.

== See also ==
- Mizoguchi clan

Preceded by Mizoguchi Shigemoto	6th Daimyō of Shibata; 1719-1732	Succeeded by Mizoguchi Naoatsu
