= Mizoguchi =

Mizoguchi (written: 溝口 lit. "gutter/drain entrance") is a Japanese surname. Notable people with the surname include:

- Hajime Mizoguchi, musician
- Mizoguchi Hidekatsu (溝口 秀勝; 1548–1610), Japanese samurai and daimyō
- Kazuhiro Mizoguchi, javelin thrower
- Kenji Mizoguchi, filmmaker
- Koji Mizoguchi (born in 1963), Japanese archaeologist
- Mizoguchi Naoatsu (溝口 直温; 1716–1780), Japanese daimyō
- Mizoguchi Naoharu (溝口 直治; 1708–1732), Japanese daimyō
- Noriko Mizoguchi, Japanese judoka

== Fictional characters ==
- Hiroshi Mizoguchi, Hikaru no Go
- Mizoguchi Makoto, Fighter's History
- The main character of Yukio Mishima's novel Kinkaku-ji
