= Mizoguchi Nobunao =

Mizoguchi Nobunao 溝口宣勝
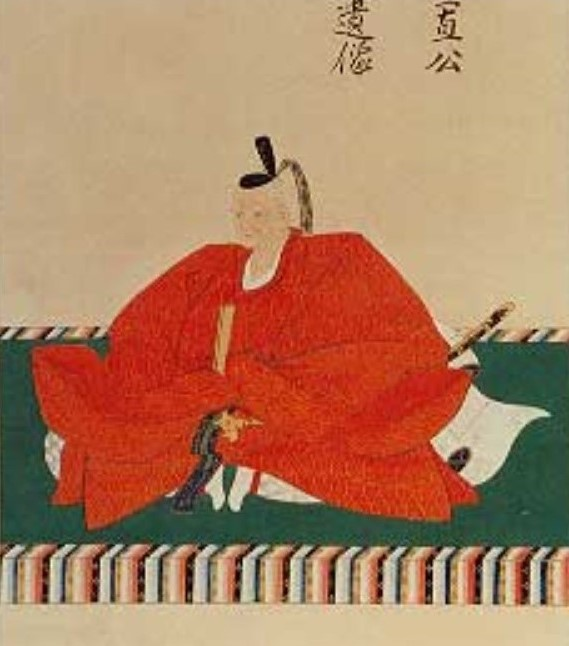
- Mizoguchi Nobunao
- Born: 1605; Shibata, Echigo Province, Japan
- Died: December 26, 1676 (aged 70–71); Edo, Musashi Province, Japan
- Occupation: Daimyō of Shibata Domain (1628–1672)
- Predecessor: Mizoguchi Nobukatsu
- Successor: Mizoguchi Shigekatsu
- Father: Mizoguchi Nobukatsu

Mizoguchi Nobunao (溝口宣直; 1605 – December 26, 1676) was the 3rd daimyō of Shibata Domain in Echigo Province, Japan (modern-day Niigata Prefecture). His courtesy title was Izumo-no-kami, and his Court rank was Junior Fifth Rank, Lower Grade.

== Biography ==
Mizoguchi Nobunao was the eldest son of Mizoguchi Nobukatsu and was born in Shibata. He became daimyō in 1628 on the death of his father. Shortly afterwards, he was called upon by the shogunate to repair a portion of the ramparts of Edo Castle. In 1633, the Agano River burst its banks and he was called upon to contract new dikes and flood control works. He accompanied Shōgun Tokugawa Iemitsu on his trip to Kyoto and provided soldiers for enhanced security at Edo Castle during the Shimabara Rebellion. Following the attainder of Katō Akinari from Aizu Domain in 1643, he was assigned to take possession of Aizuwakamatsu Castle on behalf of the shogunate. He was later appointed Osaka kaban. The domain suffered during this time from flooding, followed by a great fire, and the domain's Edo residence also burned down during the Great fire of Meireki in 1657. Despite these disasters, he was able to lay out the Shimizu-en gardens in Shibata, and to also develop flood control projects for the Shibata River. he retired in 1672, and died in Edo 1676, leaving a domain in fiscal exhaustion. His grave is at the temple of Shōtō-ji in what is now Taitō, Tokyo, which he founded.

Nobunao was married to a daughter of Inaba Kazumichi of Usuki Domain, and after he death remarried to a daughter of Morikawa Shigetoshi of Oyumi Domain. He had 3 sons and 4 daughters.

== See also ==
- Mizoguchi clan

Preceded by Mizoguchi Nobukatsu	3rd Daimyō of Shibata; 1628–1672	Succeeded by Mizoguchi Shigekatsu
