= Hori Naohide =

Hori Naohide may refer to:

- Hori Naohide (Muramatsu) (1797-1861), daimyō of Muramatsu Domain
- Hori Naohide (Suzaka) (1700-1767), daimyō of Suzaka Domain
