= Hori Naohiro =

Hori Naohiro may refer to:

- Hori Naohiro (Muramatsu) (1861–1919), daimyō of Muromatsu Domain
- Hori Naohiro (Suzaka) (1719-1777), daimyō of Suzaka Domain

== See also ==
- Hori clan
