= Mizoguchi Naoatsu =

Japanese daimyō

Mizoguchi Naoatsu 溝口直温
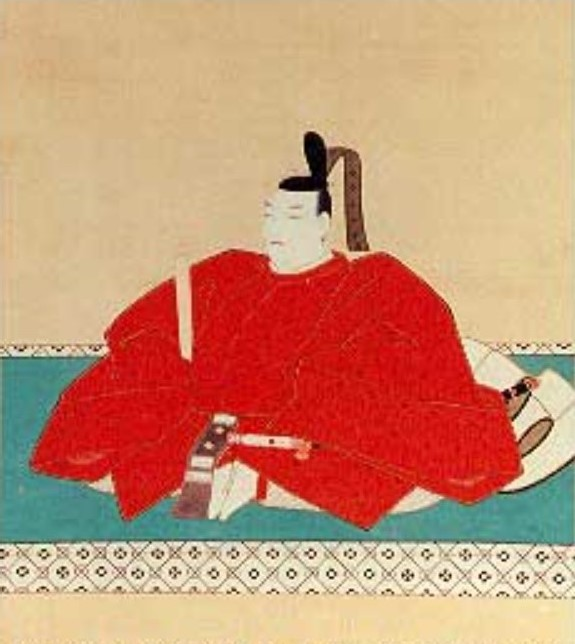
- Mizoguchi Naoatsu
- Born: June 20, 1716
- Died: October 1, 1780 (aged 64); Edo, Musashi Province, Japan
- Occupation: Daimyō of Shibata Domain (1732-1761)
- Predecessor: Mizoguchi Naoharu
- Successor: Mizoguchi Naoyasu
- Father: Mizoguchi Naomichi

Mizoguchi Naoatsu (溝口直温; June 20, 1716 – October 1, 1780) was the 7th daimyō of Shibata Domain in Echigo Province, Japan (modern-day Niigata Prefecture). His courtesy title was Izumo-no-kami, and his Court rank was Junior Fifth Rank, Lower Grade.

== Biography ==
Mizoguchi Naoatsu was the fourth son of Mizoguchi Naomichi, a hatamoto retainer of Shibata Domain from a cadet branch of the Mizoguchi clan. His childhood name was Kamenosuke. He was adopted as posthumous heir to Mizoguchi Naoharu in 1732 and received in formal audience by Shōgun Tokugawa Tsunayoshi the same year. In 1733, the clan was ordered to help repair the moats on Edo Castle. In 1735, the clan was ordered to survey and assist in land reclamation of the Shiunjigata marshes in Echigo Province, after which the clan was entrusted with administration of 16,850 koku of new tenryō lands. Although the domain suffered from fewer flooding disasters than under his predecessors, good harvests conversely drove the price of rice down, and the domain remained unable to free itself of debt. Furthermore, in 1738, the domain was ordered to return the 83,400 koku of tenryō lands back to direct administration by the shogunate. In 1748, the domain was ordered to assist the Korean embassy to Japan during its stay ate Kanagawa-juku on the Tōkaidō. In 1754, the domain traded 52 villages with an assessed kokudaka of 10,000 koku to the shogunate in exchange for 33 villages in another location. A similar trade occurred the following year, with the domain trading 15 villages for 31 others. Naoatsu retired in 1761, citing illness, and died in 1780. His grave is at the temple of Kisshō-ji in Tokyo.

Naoatsu was married to a daughter of Matsudaira Nobutoki of Hamamatsu Domain, and had 8 sons and 4 daughters.

== See also ==
- Mizoguchi clan

| Preceded by Mizoguchi Naoharu | 7th Daimyō of Shibata; 1732-1761 | Succeeded by Mizoguchi Naoyasu |
