= Hori Naokata =

Hori Naokata may refer to:

- Hori Naokata (Muramatsu) (1767-1805), daimyō of Muramatsu Domain
- Hori Naokata (Suzaka) (1743-1779), daimyō of Suzaka Domain

== See also ==
- Hori clan
