= Shibata Castle =

Coordinates: 37°57′19.68″N 139°19′31.47″E

Shibata Castle 新発田城
- Shibata, Niigata Prefecture, Japan
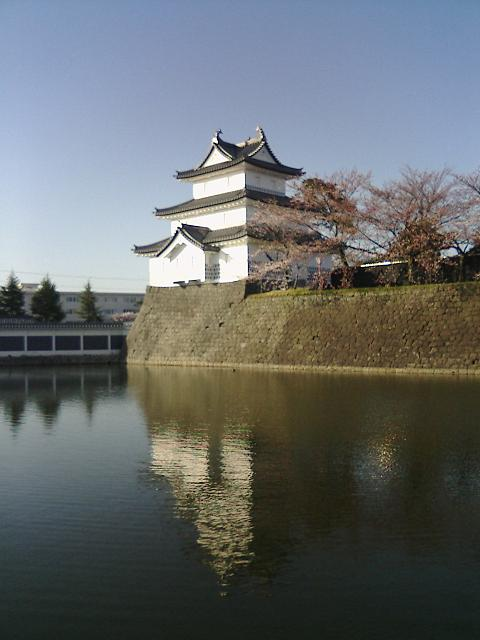
- Keep of rebuilt Shibata Castle

Site information
- Type: flatland-style Japanese castle
- Controlled by: Shibata clan (-1587), Mizoguchi clan (1597–1873), Japan (1873–present)
- Condition: The original Omote-Gate, and Ninomaru-sumi-yagura survive. Gosankai-yagura and Tatsumi-yagura reconstructed in 2004.

Location

Site history
- Built: Early Kamakura period; reconstructed 1597-1654
- Built by: Shibata clan (original); Mizoguchi Clan
- In use: Early Kamakura period-1945,1953-present(as military base)
- Materials: stone, wood, plaster walls

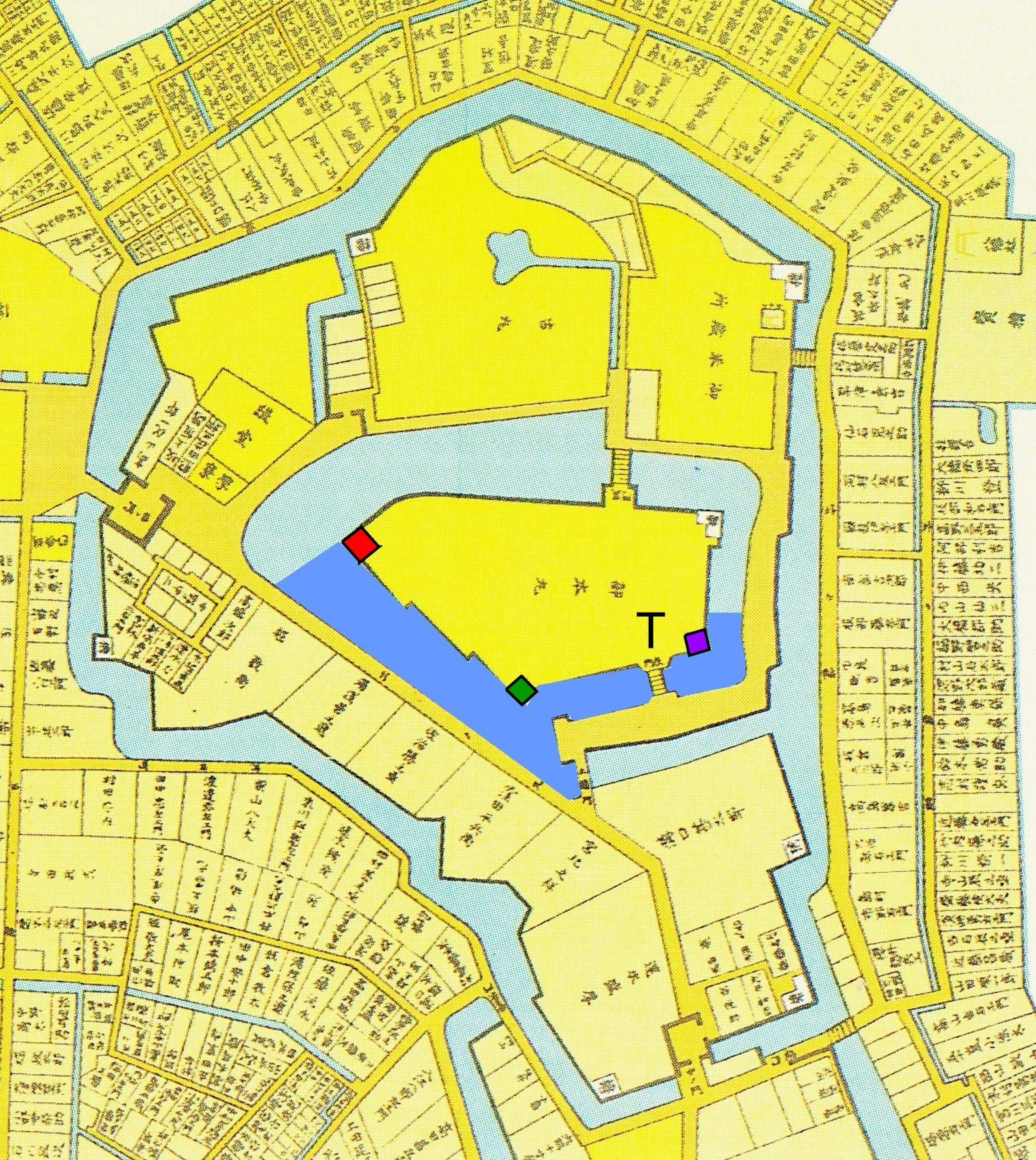
Dark Blue: preserved moat; T = Omote-mon; Red = Tatsumi Yagura; Green = Secondary Enclosure

Shibata Castle (新発田城, Shibata-jō) is a flatland-style Japanese castle located in the city of Shibata, Niigata Prefecture, Japan. Throughout the Edo period, Shibata Castle was home to the Mizoguchi clan, daimyō of Shibata Domain. The castle was also known as "Ayame-jō" (菖蒲城, "Iris Castle").

== Background ==
Shibata Castle is located at the center of the modern city of Shibata, approximately 20 kilometers east of the city of Niigata. Historically, the area was a vast marsh made by Shinano River and the Agano River, which were both important trade routes for Echigo Province. The construction date of the original Shibata Castle is unknown; however, the surrounding area was under control of the Shibata clan since the Kamakura period. The Shibata were a cadet branch of the Sasaki clan, from Sasaki Moritsuna, a retainer of Minamoto no Yoritomo who had been awarded estates in this area for his role in suppressing a local rebellion. By the middle of Muromachi period, the Shibata were the most powerful of the "Agekitashu", a group of local petty lords who were mostly independent due to their distance from the provincial capital at Jōetsu. However, by the Sengoku period, the Shibata became retainers of Uesugi Kenshin, and Shibata Nagatsu (1538–1580) was ranked among Kenshin's top seven generals. After Kenshin's death, his two adopted sons Uesugi Kagekatsu and Uesugi Kagetora fought a war over the succession. The Shibata were instrumental in Kagekatsu's victory but were highly incensed when Kagekatsu failed to follow through on his promises to increase their territory. Lured by promised by Oda Nobunaga, Shibata Shigeie (1547–1587) revolted against Kagekatsu, but was defeated after a fierce seven year war, and the clan was destroyed.

Shibata Castle was taken by Uesugi Kagekatsu, but in 1597, Toyotomi Hideyoshi moved the Uesugi clan to Aizu-Wakamatsu and assigned the former Shibata lands to Mizoguchi Hidekatsu in 1598. Hidekatsu had originally been a retainer of Niwa Nagahide, but after his death pledged fealty directly to Toyotomi Hideyoshi. After the death of Toyotomi Hideyoshi, he pledged fealty to Tokugawa Ieyasu, and was confirmed in his holdings by the new Tokugawa shogunate after the Battle of Sekigahara,

The Mizoguchi clan rebuilt Shibata Castle in the contemporary flatland castle style. The geographic location is secured place surrounded by rivers, on two sides and the surrounding marshland. As the Mizoguchi clan had only limited resources, the construction processed very slowly, and was not completed until the rule of the 3rd generation daimyō of Shibata Domain, Mizobuchi Nobunao, in 1654. Much of the castle was destroyed by a fire in 1668 and rebuilt by 1679. The current Omotemon (表門) main gate dates from a 1732 reconstruction and is the oldest surviving structure of the castle.

== Layout ==
The inner bailey of the castle is a pentagonal area approximately 100 meters in length, surrounded by tall wall and roughly follows the outlines of the original Shibata clan fortification. Yagura turrets were built at each corner of inner bailey, with the yagura on the west corner larger than the others, and served in lieu of a tenshu. This three-story yagura has an unusual T-shaped roof, with a distinctive three three gables and hence, thus three statues of shachihoko on the roof. A secondary bailey surrounded the inner bailey, protected by clay walls, except for the walls on the south and west (which faced the jōkamachi, which were in stone. The secondary bailey had gates to the east, west and south, with the south gate being the main gate to the castle. A third bailey was located to the south of the second bailey. The total size of castle was about 500 meters long by 200 meters wide.

== Current situation ==
Following the Meiji restoration and subsequent abolition of the han system, the Mizobuchi clan surrendered Shibata Castle to the new Meiji government. In 1871, the castle was garrisoned by a detachment of the Imperial Japanese Army, and in 1873 most of the structures were pulled down. At the time, it had 11 yagura and five gates. Of those 16 main structures only one gate, the Omotemon, and one yagura Sumi yagura (隅櫓) remain today. Both are designated as important cultural properties. The wall outside the turret, in a style called Namako kabe (海鼠壁), is waterproof. The stone wall is made of regularly piled stones in the manner of Kirikomihagi.

After 2004, three-story Sangai yagura (三階櫓) and Tatsumi yagura (辰巳櫓) were reconstructed from old photographs and drawings.

In 2006, Shibata Castle was listed as one of the 100 Fine Castles of Japan by the Japan Castle Foundation.

The majority of the secondary and the inner baileys are occupied by a Japan Ground Self Defense Force base and public access is not permitted.

== Gallery ==
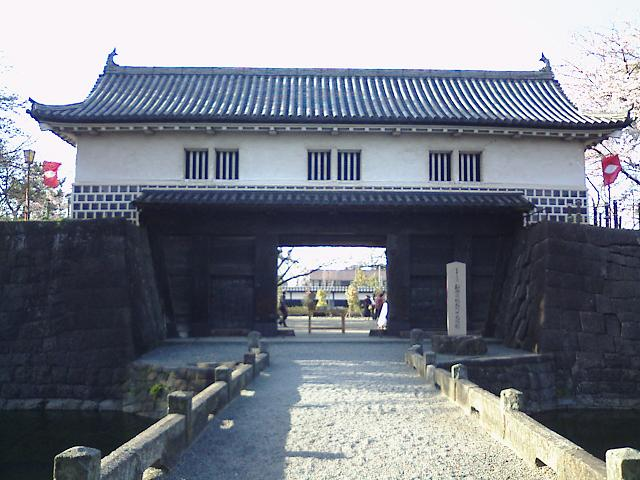
Omote-mon Gate

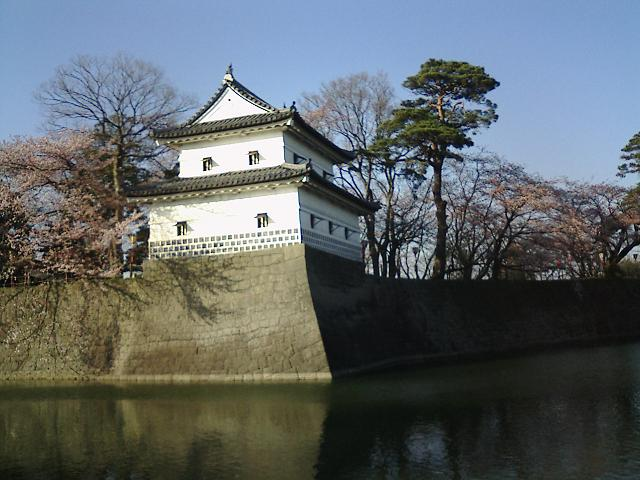
Ninomaru-sumi-Yagura

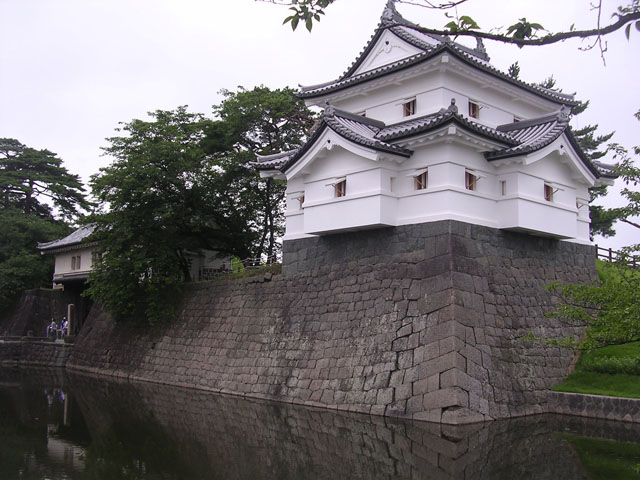
Tatsumi-Yagura

== See also ==
- List of foreign-style castles in Japan

== Bibliography ==
- Benesch, Oleg and Ran Zwigenberg (2019). Japan's Castles: Citadels of Modernity in War and Peace. Cambridge: Cambridge University Press. p. 374. ISBN 9781108481946.
- De Lange, William (2021). An Encyclopedia of Japanese Castles. Groningen: Toyo Press. pp. 600 pages. ISBN 978-9492722300.
- Schmorleitz, Morton S. (1974). Castles in Japan. Tokyo: Charles E. Tuttle Co. pp. 144–145. ISBN 0-8048-1102-4.
- Motoo, Hinago (1986). Japanese Castles. Tokyo: Kodansha. p. 200 pages. ISBN 0-87011-766-1.
- Mitchelhill, Jennifer (2004). Castles of the Samurai: Power and Beauty. Tokyo: Kodansha. p. 112 pages. ISBN 4-7700-2954-3.
- Turnbull, Stephen (2003). Japanese Castles 1540-1640. Osprey Publishing. p. 64 pages. ISBN 1-84176-429-9.
