= Shiiya Domain =

Shiiya Domain 椎谷藩
- under Tokugawa shogunate Japan
- 1698–1871
- Capital: Shiiya jin'ya
- Area
  - Coordinates: 37°28′33.57″N 138°37′11.26″E
  - Type: Daimyō
- Historical era: Edo period
  - Established: 1698
  - Disestablished: 1871
- Today part of: part of Niigata Prefecture

Shiiya Domain (椎谷藩, Shiiya-han) was a fudai feudal domain under the Tokugawa shogunate of Edo period Japan. It was located in Echigo Province, in the Hokuriku region of Honshū. The domain was centered at Shiiya Jin'ya, located on the coast of what is now part of the city of Kashiwazaki in Niigata Prefecture.

== History ==
For his role in the Siege of Osaka, Hori Naoyuki, the 4th son of the famous general Hori Naomasa, was granted 5,500 koku holding in Echigo Province July 1616. He built a jin'ya in Shiiya to administer his new domain. Naoyuki's son Hori Naokage, served as Edo bugyō and Jisha-bugyō in the shogunal administration, and for which he was awarded additional holdings with a kokudaka of 9,500 koku, to which he added an additional 2,000 koku of newly developed rice lands. This enabled him to qualify for the status of daimyō. He established his seat in Kazusa Province at Kazusa-Kariya Domain (1642-1668) in what is now part of the city of Isumi, Chiba. His son, Hori Naoyoshi, moved to Kazusa-Hachiman Domain (1668-1698) in what is now part of Ichihara, Chiba. Tori Naoyoshi's son Hori Naosada then moved the clan's seat to the original jin'ya in Echigo Province in 1698, which marked the official start of Shiiya Domain. The clan headquarters remained at Shiiya until the Meiji restoration; however, the daimyō remained in permanent residence in Edo and managed the domain as absentee landlords.

During the period of the 8th daimyō, Hori Akitomo, fiscal reforms were implemented; however, Akitomo was of weak constitution and was unable to see the reforms through. The domain was also hit hard by the Great Tenmei famine, which resulted in considerable peasant unrest.

During the Boshin War, the domain was a battleground in Battle of Hokuetsu. In July 1871, with the abolition of the han system, Shiiya Domain briefly became Shiiya Prefecture, and was merged into the newly created Niigata Prefecture. Under the new Meiji government, Hori Yukiyoshi, the final daimyō of Shiiya Domain was given the kazoku peerage title of danshaku (baron).

== Bakumatsu period holdings ==
As with most domains in the han system, Shiiya Domain consisted of several discontinuous territories calculated to provide the assigned kokudaka, based on periodic cadastral surveys and projected agricultural yields.

- Echigo Province
  - 21 villages in Kariwa District
- Shinano Province
  - 2 villages in Minochi District
  - 7 villages in Takai District

== List of daimyō ==
#	Name	Tenure	Courtesy title	Court Rank	kokudaka	Notes
Hori clan (fudai) 1689-1871
1	Hori Naokage (堀直景)	1642-1668	''Shikibu-no-sho (式部少輔)	Junior 5th Rank, Lower Grade (従五位下)	10,000 koku	Kazusa-Kariya Domain
2	Hori Naoyoshi (堀直良)	1668-1668	Hida-no-kami (飛騨守)	Junior 5th Rank, Lower Grade (従五位下)	10,000 koku	
#	Name	Tenure	Courtesy title	Court Rank	kokudaka	Notes
Hori clan (fudai) 1689-1871
1	Hori Naoyoshi (堀直良)	1668-1691	Hida-no-kami (飛騨守)	Junior 5th Rank, Lower Grade (従五位下)	10,000 koku	Kazusa-Hachiman Domain
2	Hori Naosada (堀直宥)	1691-1698	Shikibu-no-sho (式部少輔)	Junior 5th Rank, Lower Grade (従五位下)	10,000 koku	
#	Name	Tenure	Courtesy title	Court Rank	kokudaka	Notes
Hori clan (fudai) 1689-1871
1	Hori Naosada (堀直宥)	1698-1711	Shikibu-no-sho (式部少輔)	Junior 5th Rank, Lower Grade (従五位下)	10,000 koku	Shiiya Domain
2	Hori Naonaka (堀直央)	1711-1720	Hida-no-kami (飛騨守)	Junior 5th Rank, Lower Grade (従五位下)	10,000 koku	
3	Hori Naotsune (堀直恒)	1720-1730	Tōtōmi-no-kami (遠江守)	Junior 5th Rank, Lower Grade (従五位下)	10,000 koku	
4	Hori Naohisa (堀直旧)	1730-1748	Izumo-no-kami (出雲守)	Junior 5th Rank, Lower Grade (従五位下)	10,000 koku	
5	Hori Naoyoshi (堀直喜)	1748-1751	Hida-no-kami (飛騨守)	Junior 5th Rank, Lower Grade (従五位下)	10,000 koku	
6	Hori Naoaki (堀直著)	1751-1768	Daizen-no-suke (大膳亮)	Junior 5th Rank, Lower Grade (従五位下)	10,000 koku	
7	Hori Naonobu (堀直宣)	1768-1781	Bizen-no-kami (備前守)	Junior 5th Rank, Lower Grade (従五位下)	10,000 koku	
8	Hori Asatomo (堀著朝)	1781-1792	Shikibu-no-sho (式部少輔)	Junior 5th Rank, Lower Grade (従五位下)	10,000 koku	
9	Hori Naonori (堀直起)	1792-1807	Ōmi-no-kami (近江守)	Junior 5th Rank, Lower Grade (従五位下)	10,000 koku	
10	Hori Naoharu (堀直温)	1808-1812	Chikugo-no-kami (筑後守)	Junior 5th Rank, Lower Grade (従五位下)	10,000 koku	
11	Hori Naochika (堀直哉)	1812-1830	Ōmi-no-kami (近江守)	Junior 5th Rank, Lower Grade (従五位下)	10,000 koku	
12	Hori Naotoshi (堀之敏)	1830-1862	Izumo-no-kami (出雲守)	Junior 5th Rank, Lower Grade (従五位下)	10,000 koku	
13	Hori Naoyoshi (堀之美)	1863-1871	Ukyō-no-suke (右京亮)	Junior 5th Rank, Lower Grade (従五位下)	10,000 koku	

== See also ==
List of Han
