= Suzaka Domain =

Suzaka Domain 須坂藩
- under Tokugawa shogunate Japan
- 1615–1871
- Capital: Suzaka jin’ya
- Area
  - Coordinates: 36.6535°N 138.3160°E
  - Type: Daimyō
- Historical era: Edo period
  - Established: 1615
  - Disestablished: 1871
- Today part of: part of Nagano Prefecture

Suzaka Domain (須坂藩, Suzaka-han) was a feudal domain under the Tokugawa shogunate of Edo period Japan. It was located in Shinano Province (modern-day Nagano Prefecture) in central Honshū. The domain was centered at Suzaka Jin’ya, located in what is now part of the town of Suzaka.

== History ==
Suzaka Domain was established for Hori Naoshige, the 4th son of Hori Naomasa, daimyō of Sanjō Domain in Echigo Province. Naoshige had holdings of 2,000 koku in Shimōsa Province and 6,000 koku in Suzaka, which had been awarded for his services during the Battle of Sekigahara. To this, he added 4,000 koku for services during the Siege of Osaka, which elevated him to daimyō status. His son, Hori Naomasu, gave the 2000 koku in Shimōsa to his younger brothers, reducing the domain to 10,000 koku. The Hori clan continued to rule Suzaka uninterrupted until the Meiji restoration.

The Hori clan served in a number of administrative posts within the government of the Tokugawa shogunate. The 9th daimyō, Hori Naoteru, opened a han school. The 12th daimyō, Hori Naotake, reformed the domain’s finances and encouraged the develop of ginseng cultivation as a cash crop.

During the Bakumatsu period, the 13th daimyō, Hori Naotora, reformed the domain’s military, introducing western-style firearms. He also served as a wakadoshiyori within the administration of the Tokugawa shogunate. he committed seppuku in Edo Castle in protest over the policies of shōgun Tokugawa Yoshinobu. During the Boshin War, the domain quickly supported the imperial side, and participated in the Battle of Utsunomiya Castle, Battle of Kōshū-Katsunuma, Battle of Hokuetsu and Battle of Aizu. In July 1871, with the abolition of the han system, Suzaka Domain briefly became Suzaka Prefecture, and was merged into the newly created Nagano Prefecture. Under the new Meiji government, Hori Naoakira, the last daimyō of Suzaka was given the kazoku peerage title of shishaku (viscount).

There was a peasant revolt in 1871 in this small domain.

== Bakumatsu period holdings ==
As with most domains in the han system, Suzaka Domain consisted of several discontinuous territories calculated to provide the assigned kokudaka, based on periodic cadastral surveys and projected agricultural yields.

- Shinano Province
  - 15 villages in Takai District

== List of daimyō ==
#	Name	Tenure	Courtesy title	Court Rank	kokudaka	Notes
Hori clan (tozama) 1615–1871
1	Hori Naoshige (堀直重)	1615–1617	Awaji-no-kami (淡路守)	Junior 5th Rank, Lower Grade (従五位下)	12,000 koku	
2	Hori Naomasu (堀直升)	1617–1637	Awaji-no-kami (淡路守)	Junior 5th Rank, Lower Grade (従五位下)	12,000 → 10,000 koku	
3	Hori Naoteru (堀直輝)	1637–1669	Buzen-no-kami (肥前守)	Junior 5th Rank, Lower Grade (従五位下))	10,000 koku	
4	Hori Naosuke (堀直佑)	1669–1719	Nagato-no-kami (長門守)	Junior 5th Rank, Lower Grade (従五位下))	10,000 koku	
5	Hori Naohide (堀直英)	1719–1735	Awaji-no-kami (淡路守)	Junior 5th Rank, Lower Grade (従五位下)	10,000 koku	
6	Hori Naohiro (堀直寛)	1735–1768	Nagato-no-kami (長門守)	Junior 5th Rank, Lower Grade (従五位下)	10,000 koku	
7	Hori Naokata (堀直堅)	1768–1779	Awaji-no-kami (淡路守)	Junior 5th Rank, Lower Grade (従五位下)	10,000 koku	
8	Hori Naosato (堀直郷)	1779–1784	Nagato-no-kami (長門守)	Junior 5th Rank, Lower Grade (従五位下)	10,000 koku	
9	Hori Naoteru (堀直皓)	1784–1813	Kura-no-kami (内蔵頭))	Junior 5th Rank, Lower Grade (従五位下)	10,000 koku	
10	Hori Naooki (堀直興)	1813–1821	Awaji-no-kami (淡路守)	Junior 5th Rank, Lower Grade (従五位下)	10,000 koku	
11	Hori Naotada (堀直格)	1821–1845	Kura-no-kami (内蔵頭))	Junior 5th Rank, Lower Grade (従五位下)	10,000 koku	
12	Hori Naotake (堀直武)	1845–1861	Awaji-no-kami (淡路守)	Junior 5th Rank, Lower Grade (従五位下)	10,000 koku	
13	Hori Naotora (堀直虎)	1861–1868	Nagato-no-kami (長門守)	Junior 5th Rank, Lower Grade (従五位下)	10,000 koku	
14	Hori Naoakira (堀直明)	1868–1871	Nagato-no-kami (長門守)	Junior 5th Rank, Lower Grade (従五位下)	30,000 koku	

=== Hori Naoshige ===
Hori Naoshige (堀直重, 1585 – July 15, 1617) was the 1st Hori daimyō of Suzaka Domain in Shinano Province under the Edo period Tokugawa shogunate. Naoshige was the fourth son of Hori Naomasa of Sanjō Domain in Echigo Province. In recognition of his services at the Battle of Sekigahara, he was awarded a 6000 koku fief at Suzaka in Shinano Province, which he added to his existing 2000 koku holdings at Yasaku in Shimōsa Province. After the Siege of Osaka, he was added an additional 4000 koku, which qualified him for the status of daimyō, and he built a jin'ya in Suzaka to rule his holdings. He died in 1617 at the age of 33.

=== Hori Naomasu ===
Hori Naomasu (堀直升, 1608 – April 12, 1637) was the 2nd Hori daimyō of Suzaka. Naomasu was the eldest son of Hori Naoshige and was received in formal audience by Shōgun Tokugawa Hidetada in 1615. He became daimyō on the death of his father in 1617. He disposed of the domain's exclave in Shimōsa Province by granting 1000 koku to his youngest brother Naoaki, 500 koku to his third brother Naohisa and 500 koku to his half-brother Naohide. He was married to the daughter of Hori Naoyuki, the Edo Machi-bugyō. He died in 1637.

=== Hori Naoteru ===
Hori Naoteru (堀直輝, 1631 – August 4, 1669) was the 3rd Hori daimyō of Suzaka. Naoteru was the eldest son of Hori Naomasu and became daimyō on the death of his father in 1637. He served as Osaka kaban in 1660 and 1663. He was married to the daughter of Matsudaira Masatsuna, of Tamanawa Domain. He died in 1669.

=== Hori Naosuke ===
Hori Naosuke (堀直佑, 1655 – July 14, 1721) was the 4th Hori daimyō of Suzaka. Naosuke was the eldest son of Hori Naoteru and became daimyō on the death of his father in 1669. After an uneventful tenure of 50 years, he retired in 1719. He was married to the daughter of Itakura Shigekata, of Annaka Domain. As his eldest son Naotomi had already died and his younger son Naotoshi had been disinherited, the domain went to his son-in-law. He died in 1721.

=== Hori Naohide ===
Hori Naohide (堀直英, January 1700 – September 12, 1767) was the 5th Hori daimyō of Suzaka. Naohide was the third son of Hori Naotoshi of Muramatsu Domain and was married to the daughter of Hori Naosuke. He was received in formal audience by Shōgun Tokugawa Ienobu in 1612 on his marriage, and became daimyō on the retirement of Naosuke in 1719. From 1725-1727, he served in the post of Obantō. He retired in 1735 in favor his son and died in 1767.

=== Hori Naohiro ===
Hori Naohiro (堀直寛, July 31, 1719 – October 20, 1777) was the 6th Hori daimyō of Suzaka. Naohiro was the eldest son of Hori Naohide and became daimyō on the retirement of his father in 1735. He served in the post of Osaka kaban and castellan of Nijō Castle. From 1746 he was an Ōbangashira and from 1751 was appointed Fushimi Bugyō. His wife was a daughter of Mitake Sukenori of Tahara Domain. He retired in 1768 in favor his son and died in 1777.

=== Hori Naokata ===
Hori Naokata (堀直堅, August 9, 1743 – December 3, 1779) was the 7th Hori daimyō of Suzaka. Naokata was the eldest son of Hori Naohiro of Muramatsu Domain and became daimyō on the retirement of his father in 1768. He served in a number of minor posts within the shogunate administration, including captain of the guard of the Hibiya Gate to Edo Castle and castellan of Sunpu Castle. From 1746 he was an Ōbangashira and from 1751 was appointed Fushimi Bugyō. He died in 1779 without heir and was succeeded by his brother.

=== Hori Naosato ===
Hori Naosato (堀直郷, March 21, 1758 – March 23, 1784) was the 8th Hori daimyō of Suzaka. Naosato was the third son of Hori Naohiro and became daimyō on the death of his elder brother Naokata in 1779. His wife was a daughter of Mizoguchi Naoyasu of Shibata Domain; however, he died in 1784 without heir.

=== Hori Naoteru ===
Hori Naoteru (堀直皓, August 12, 1755 – August 17, 1814) was the 9th Hori daimyō of Suzaka. Naosato was the seventh son of Tachibana Nagahiro of Miike Domain and his mother was a daughter of Hori Naohide. He was adopted as posthumous heir to the childless Naosato on the latter's death in 1784 and was presented in formal audience to Shōgun Tokugawa Ieharu the same year. In 1789 he was appointed Osaka kaban, and in 1792 he was appointed Ōbangashira and castellan of Nijō Castle. He resigned his offices in 1803 citing illness; however, in 1804 he was appointed a Sōshaban. He resigned this post in 1809, again citing illness. He established a han school in the domain around 1804. He retired from his offices in 1813 and died the following year. His wife was a daughter of Hosokawa Okiharu of Yatabe Domain.

=== Hori Naooki ===
Hori Naooki (堀直興, September 17, 1793 – July 9, 1821) was the 10th Hori daimyō of Suzaka. Naooki was the eldest son of Hori Naoteru and became daimyō on the retirement of his father in 1804. His wife was a daughter of Tachibana Tanechika of Miike Domain; however, he died in 1821 without heir.

=== Hori Naotada ===
Hori Naotada (堀直格, December 23, 1806 – August 13, 1880) was the 11th Hori daimyō of Suzaka. Naotada was the third son of Hori Naoteru and became daimyō on the death of his elder brother without heir in 1821. He retired in favor of his eldest son in 1845. His wife was a daughter of Nishio Tadayoshi of Yokosuka Domain. After the Meiji Restoration, he adopted the surname of Okuda (奥田).

=== Hori Naotake ===
Hori Naotake (堀直武, May 29, 1830 – August 31, 1862) was the 12th Hori daimyō of Suzaka. Naotake was the eldest son of Hori Naotada and became daimyō on his father's retirement in 1845. He served in a number of minor posts within the shogunate administration, including Osaka kaban, castellan of Sunpu Castle and captain of the guard of the Hibiya Gate to Edo Castle. He retired in 1861. His wife was a daughter of Nishio Tadasaka of Yokosuka Domain; however, he died in 1862 without heir.

=== Hori Naotora ===
Hori Naotora (堀直虎, September 26, 1836 – February 10, 1868) was the 13th Hori daimyō of Suzaka. Naotora was born in Edo as the 5th son of Hori Naotada, the 11th daimyō of Suzaka Domain. In 1861, on the retirement of his elder brother Hori Naotake, he became daimyō of Suzaka. Immediately on assuming office, he removed 41 senior retainers from office, including the domain's karō, and pursued an aggressive policy of reforms, which also include westernization and modernization of the domain's military capability. He also supported the Tokugawa shogunate, and was given the position of Ōbangashira in 1863. In 1864, he received an order to pursue and suppress the Mito Rebellion, but the orders were cancelled five days later, and he was ordered instead to strengthen public security within Edo. In December 1867 he rose to the position of wakadoshiyori and was simultaneously appointed Gaikoku Sō-Bugyō (Foreign Affairs Magistrate). However, in January 1868 he committed suicide by drowning within Edo Castle as a gesture of protest against the surrender of the office of Shogun by Tokugawa Yoshinobu.

=== Hori Naoakira ===
Hori Naoakira (堀直明, October 9, 1839 – September 18, 1885) was the 14th (and final) Hori daimyō of Suzaka. Naotora was born in Edo as the 6th son of Hori Naotada, the 11th daimyō of Suzaka Domain. In 1868, on the suicide of his elder brother Hori Naotora, he became daimyō of Suzaka. Immediately on assuming office, he completely reversed the politics of his brother and declared the domain for the Meiji government and dispatched troops to fight against the pro-Tokugawa forces in the Boshin War. Samurai from the domain were active at the Battle of Utsunomiya, Battle of Hokuetsu and Battle of Aizu. Many of the undecided minor daimyō of Shinano were thus convinced to join the new government, which then awarded Suzaka Domain with a bonus of 5000 koku. In June 1869 he was proclaimed imperial governor of Suzaka and in July 1871, with the abolition of the han system, he surrendered his offices and relocated to Tokyo. On February 13, 1877, he officially changed his surname to "Okuda". In 1884, he was elevated to the title of viscount (shishaku) under the new kazoku peerage system. He died the following year in Tokyo.

== See also ==
List of Han
