= Hori Naoakira =

Hori Naoakira 堀直明
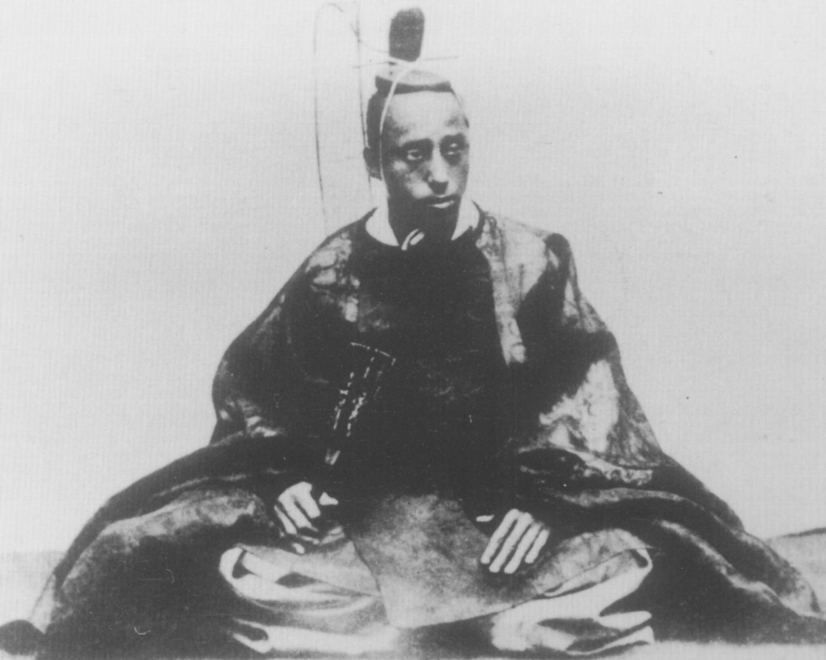
- Hori Naoakira
- Born: October 9, 1839; Edo, Japan
- Died: September 18, 1885 (aged 45); Tokyo, Japan
- Occupation: Daimyō of Suzaka Domain (1868-1871)
- Father: Hori Naotora

Hori Naoakira (堀直明; October 9, 1839 – September 18, 1885) was the 14th (and final) daimyō of Suzaka Domain (12,000 koku) in northern Shinano Province, Honshū, Japan (modern-day Nagano Prefecture). Before the Meiji Restoration, his courtesy title was Nagato-no-kami (later Kura-no-kami), and his Court rank was Junior Fifth Rank, Lower Grade.

== Biography ==
Hori Naotora was born in Edo as the 6th son of Hori Naotada, the 11th daimyō of Suzaka Domain. In 1868, on the suicide of his elder brother Hori Naotora, he became daimyō of Suzaka. Immediately on assuming office, he completely reversed the politics of his brother and declared the domain for the Meiji government and dispatched troops to fight against the pro-Tokugawa forces in the Boshin War. Samurai from the domain were active at the Battle of Utsunomiya, Battle of Hokuetsu and Battle of Aizu. Many of the undecided minor daimyō of Shinano were thus convinced to join the new government, which then awarded Suzaka Domain with a bonus of 5000 koku.

In June 1869 he was proclaimed imperial governor of Suzaka and in July 1871, with the abolition of the han system, he surrendered his offices and relocated to Tokyo. On February 13, 1877, he officially changed his surname to "Okuda". In 1884, he was elevated to the title of viscount (shishaku) under the new kazoku peerage system. He died the following year in Tokyo and his grave is at the Yanaka Cemetery.

Preceded by Hori Naotora	14th Daimyo of Suzaka; 1861-1868	Succeeded by -none-
