= Mizoguchi Hidekatsu =

- 溝口 秀勝
- Succeeded by: Mizoguchi Nobukatsu

Personal details
- Born: 1548 Owari Province, Japan
- Died: November 13, 1610 (aged 61–62) Shibata, Echigo Province, Japan
- Parent: Mizoguchi Katsumasa (father)
- Occupation: Daimyō of Shibata Domain (1598–1610)

Mizoguchi Hidekatsu (溝口 秀勝; 1548 – November 13, 1610) was a Sengoku period samurai and early Edo period daimyō of Shibata Domain in Echigo Province, Japan (modern-day Niigata Prefecture). His courtesy title was Hōki-no-kami, and his Court rank was Junior Fifth Rank, Lower Grade.

== Biography ==
Mizoguchi Hidekatsu was the eldest son of Mizoguchi Katsumasa and was born in Mizobuchi village, Nakamura District of Owari Province, in what is now part of the modern city of Inazawa, Aichi. His childhood name was Take-maru (竹丸), and his post-genpuku name was Sadakatsu (定勝). He entered the service of Niwa Nagahide as a child.

By 1581, his talents had come to the attention of Oda Nobunaga, who accepted him as a direct retainer, and who granted him a 5000 koku fief in what is now Takahama, Fukui.

In 1582, Nobunaga was assassinated in the Honnō-ji Incident and he transferred his allegiance to Toyotomi Hideyoshi.

Following the 1583 Battle of Shizugatake, he was made a yoriki-daimyō under Niwa Nagahide and transferred to Daishō-ji in Kaga Province with a kokudaka of 44,000 koku.

In 1585, following Niwa Nagahide's death, Hideyoshi recognized him as an independent daimyō, and the following year he changed his name from Sadakatsu to Hidekatsu.

During the Japanese invasions of Korea (1592–1598), he was assigned to the guard at Hideyoshi's headquarters at Nagoya Castle in Hizen Province and in 1598 was transferred to Shibata Domain in Echigo Province with an increase in kokudaka to 60,000 koku.

In 1600, he sided with the Eastern Army in the Battle of Sekigahara and was thus confirmed in his holdings by the Tokugawa shogunate. He died in Shibata in 1610 at the age of 63.

Hidekatsu had 2 sons and 5 daughters and was succeeded by his eldest son, Mizoguchi Nobukatsu. His second son, Mizoguchi Yoshikatsu was the first daimyō of Sōme Domain, a 10,000 koku domain which existed from 1610 to 1687.

== See also ==
- Mizoguchi clan

| Preceded by -none- | 1st Daimyō of Shibata; 1539–1610 | Succeeded by Mizoguchi Nobukatsu |
