= Hori Naotora =

Japanese samurai (1836–1868)

Hori Naotora 堀直虎
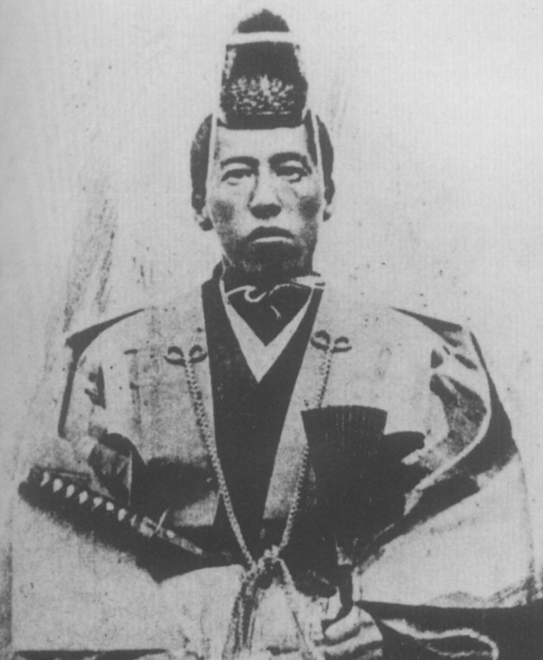
- Hori Naotora
- Born: September 26, 1836; Edo, Japan
- Died: February 10, 1868 (aged 31); Edo, Japan
- Occupation: Daimyō of Suzaka Domain (1861-1868)
- Father: Hori Naotake

Hori Naotora (堀直虎; September 26, 1836 – February 10, 1868) was the 13th daimyō of Suzaka Domain (12,000 koku) in northern Shinano Province (modern-day Nagano Prefecture), Honshū, Japan under the Bakumatsu period Tokugawa shogunate. His courtesy title was Nagato-no-kami (later Kura-no-kami), and his Court rank was Junior Fifth Rank, Lower Grade.

== Biography ==
Hori Naotora was born in Edo as the 5th son of Hori Naotada, the 11th daimyō of Suzaka Domain. In 1861, on the retirement of his elder brother Hori Naotake without an heir, he became daimyō of Suzaka. Immediately on assuming office, he removed 41 senior retainers from office, including the domain's karō, and pursued an aggressive policy of reforms, which also include westernization and modernization of the domain's military capability. He also supported the politics of the Tokugawa shogunate against the increasingly restive pro-Sonnō jōi faction, and was given the position of Ōbangashira in 1863. In 1864, he received an order to pursue and suppress supporters of the Mito Rebellion who were marching through Shinano Province en route to Kyoto, but the orders were cancelled five days later, and he was ordered instead to strengthen public security within Edo. In December 1867 he was promoted to the position of wakadoshiyori and was simultaneously appointed Gaikoku Sō-Bugyō (Foreign Affairs Magistrate). However, in January 1868 he committed suicide by drowning within Edo Castle as a gesture of protest against the surrender of the office of Shogun by Tokugawa Yoshinobu.

Naotora was married to a daughter of Matsudaira Tadakata of Ueda Domain; however, as he had no heir at the time of his death, the domain went to his younger brother, Hori Naoakira.

Preceded by Hori Naotake	13th Daimyo of Suzaka; 1861-1868	Succeeded by Hori Naoakira
