= Shibata Domain =

Shibata Domain 新発田藩
- under Tokugawa shogunate Japan
- 1598–1871
- Capital: Shibata Castle
- Area
  - Coordinates: 37°57′19.68″N 139°19′31.47″E
  - Type: Daimyō
- Historical era: Edo period
  - Established: 1598
  - Disestablished: 1871
- Today part of: part of Niigata Prefecture

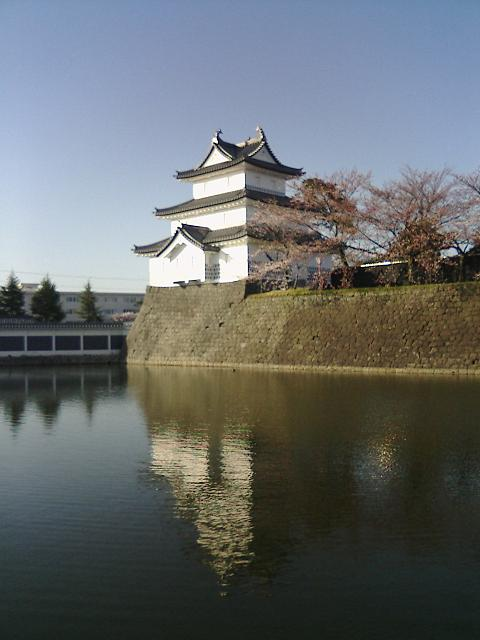
Corner yagura of Shibata Castle, the administrative centre of Shibata Domain

Shibata Domain (新発田藩, Shibata-han) was a tozama feudal domain under the Tokugawa shogunate of Edo period Japan. It is located in Echigo Province, Honshū. The domain was centered at Shibata Castle, located in what is now the city of Shibata in Niigata Prefecture. It was ruled for all of its history by the Mizoguchi clan.

== History ==
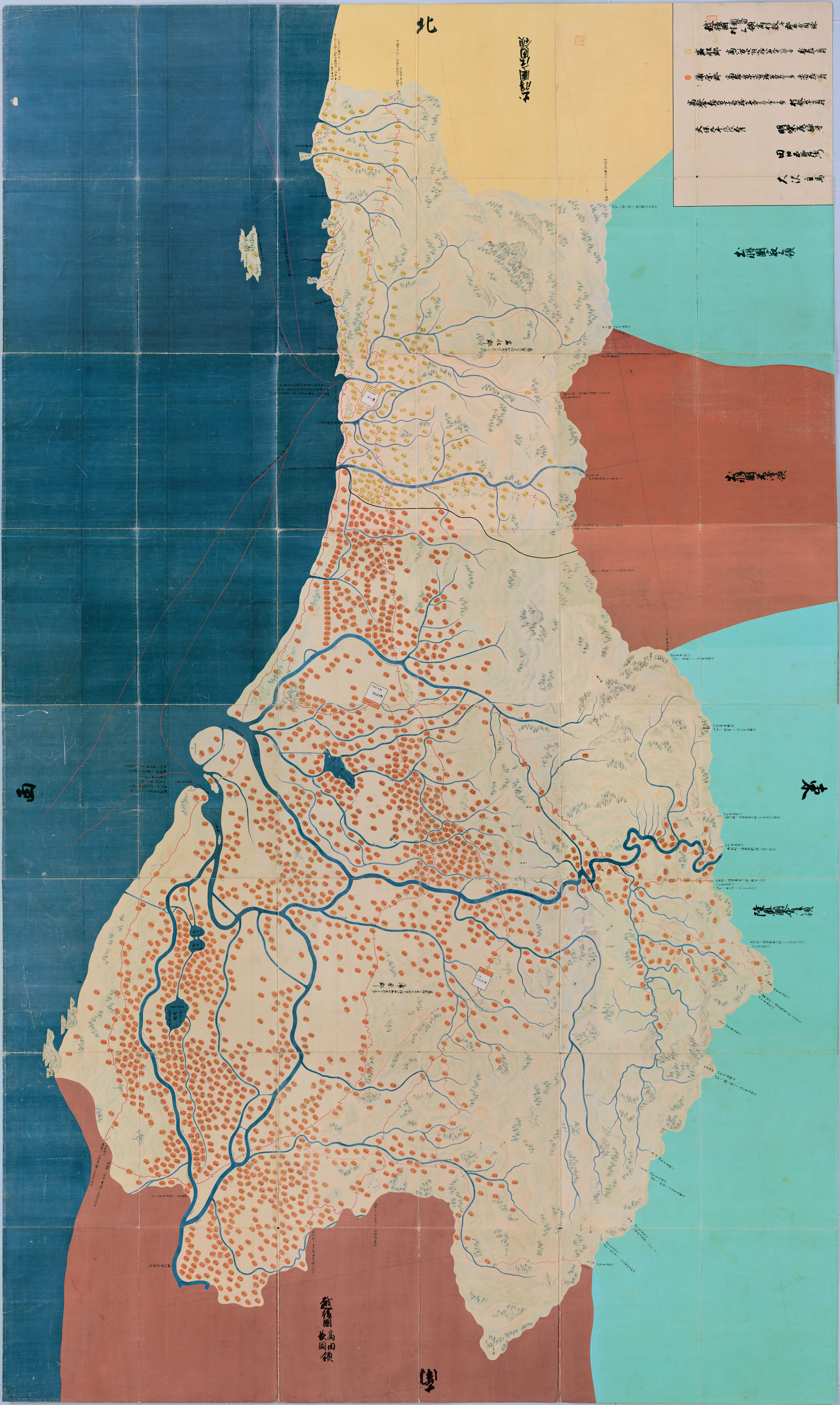
Tenpō era map of Shibata and Murakami

Mizoguchi Hidekatsu was a general under Oda Nobunaga and subsequently Toyotomi Hideyoshi. He distinguished himself at a number of battles and was rewarded with a 60,000 koku holding in Echigo Province. During the Battle of Sekigahara, he sided with Tokugawa Ieyasu; however as Echigo Province had many supporters and former retainers of the Uesugi clan, he was ordered to remain in Echigo on guard duty. After the establishment of the Tokugawa Shogunate, he was confirmed in his existing holdings, which extended across the Echigo Plain between the Agano River and the Shinano River. This area, which stretched from eastern Niigata City, through Agano, Kamo and Minamikanbara District was excellent rice land, and the actual revenues of the domain were far in excess of its official kokudaka.

The second daimyō of Shibata, Mizoguchi Nobukatsu, split a 12,000 koku holding off of the domain for his younger brother, creating Sōmei Domain (沢海藩, Sōmei han), which lasted to 1687. The kokudaka of the domain was reduced from 60,000 to 50,000 with the remaining 2,000 coming from new rice lands developed within the domain. Nobukatsu was very active in developing new lands, and an additional 15,500 koku were splint amongst his three younger sons on his death, leaving the main 50,000 koku holding intact for his heir. The 8th daimyō, Mizoguchi Naoyasu established a Han school and invited noted gardeners from Edo and Kyoto as part of his rebuilding of the castle town. The 10th daimyō, Mizoguchi Naoaki, successfully petitioned the shogunate for an increase in kokudaka from 50,000 to 100,000 koku, although there was considerable debate within the domain as to whether or not the increased taxation was worth the increase in prestige and status.

During the Boshin War, the 12th daimyō, Mizoguchi Naomasa joined the Ōuetsu Reppan Dōmei; however, there was extensive opposition within the domain, and he was forced to quickly switch sides to the imperial cause.

In July 1871, with the abolition of the han system, Shibata Domain briefly became Shibata Prefecture, and was merged into the newly created Niigata Prefecture. Under the new Meiji government, Mizoguchi Naomasa was given the kazoku peerage title of hakushaku (count), and later served as a member of the House of Peers

== Bakumatsu period holdings ==
As with most domains in the han system, Shibata Domain consisted of several discontinuous territories calculated to provide the assigned kokudaka, based on periodic cadastral surveys and projected agricultural yields.

- Echigo Province
  - 512 villages in Kanbara District
- Mutsu Province (Iwashiro)
  - 8 villages in Shinobu District

== List of daimyō ==
#	Name	Tenure	Courtesy title	Court Rank	kokudaka	Notes
Mizoguchi clan (tozama) 1598-1871
1	Mizoguchi Hidekatsu (溝口秀勝)	1598-1610	Hōki-no-kami (伯耆守)	Junior 5th Rank, Lower Grade (従五位下)	60,000 koku	
2	Mizoguchi Nobukatsu (溝口宣勝1)	1610-1628	Hōki-no-kami (伯耆守)	Junior 5th Rank, Lower Grade (従五位下)	60,000->50,000 koku	
3	Mizoguchi Nobunao (溝口宣直)	1628-1672	Izumo-no-kami (出雲守)	Junior 5th Rank, Lower Grade (従五位下)	50,000 koku	
4	Mizoguchi Shigekatsu (溝口重雄)	1672-1706	Shinano-no-kami (信濃守)	Junior 5th Rank, Lower Grade (従五位下)	50,000 koku	
5	Mizoguchi Shigemoto (溝口重元)	1706-1719	Hōki-no-kami (伯耆守)	Junior 5th Rank, Lower Grade (従五位下)	50,000 koku	
6	Mizoguchi Naoharu (溝口直治)	1791-1732	Shinano-no-kami (信濃守)	Junior 5th Rank, Lower Grade (従五位下)	50,000 koku	
7	Mizoguchi Naoatsu (溝口直温)	1732-1761	Izumo-no-kami (出雲守)	Junior 5th Rank, Lower Grade (従五位下)	50,000 koku	
8	Mizoguchi Naoyasu (溝口直養)	1761-1768	Shuzen-no-kami (主膳正)	Junior 5th Rank, Lower Grade (従五位下)	50,000 koku	
9	Mizoguchi Naotoki (溝口直侯)	1768-1802	Izumo-no-kami (出雲守)	Junior 5th Rank, Lower Grade (従五位下)	50,000 koku	
10	Mizoguchi Naoaki (溝口直諒)	1802-1838	Hōki-no-kami (伯耆守)	Junior 5th Rank, Lower Grade (従五位下)	50,000->100,000 koku	
11	Mizoguchi Naohiro (溝口直溥)	1838-1867	Shuzen-no-kami (主膳正)	Junior 5th Rank, Lower Grade (従五位下)	100,000 koku	
12	Mizoguchi Naomasa (溝口直正)	1867-1871	Hōki-no-kami (伯耆守)	Junior 5th Rank, Lower Grade (従五位下)	100,000 koku	

== See also ==
- List of Han
- Abolition of the han system
