= Muramatsu Domain =

Muramatsu Domain 村松藩
- under Tokugawa shogunate Japan
- 1639–1871
- Capital: Muramatsu Castle
- Area
  - Coordinates: 37°41′35.4″N 139°10′12″E
  - Type: Daimyō
- Historical era: Edo period
  - Established: 1639
  - Disestablished: 1871
- Today part of: Niigata Prefecture

Muramatsu Domain (村松藩, Muramatsu-han) was a tozama feudal domain under the Tokugawa shogunate of Edo period Japan. It was located in Echigo Province, Honshū. The domain was centered at Muramatsu Jin'ya (later renamed Muramatsu Castle), located in what is now part of the city of Gosen in Niigata Prefecture.

== History ==
Upon the death of Hori Naoyori, daimyō of Murakami Domain, a 30,000 koku portion of his holdings was separated out into a separate domain for his younger son, Hori Naotoki. This marked the start of Muramatsu Domain. However, to be more precise, Hori Naotoki built his seat at Yasuda in Echigo Province, and it was not until the time of his son, Hori Naoyoshi, that the jin'ya was moved to Muramatsu. The area of the domain was mostly mountainous and unsuited to the development of new rice lands. Its actual kokudaka was only around 40,000 koku. Although Hori Naoyoshi attempted a survey and land reform, he died before it could be completed and the domain was perennially in debt. During the time of the 8th daimyō, Hori Naoyasu, some fiscal reforms were initiated, which resulted in a peasant uprising in 1814. During the time of the 9th daimyō, Hori Naohide, a more successful reform was implemented, with woven goods, washi, green tea, and a form of ceramics known as Muramatsu-yaki developed to supplement the domain's income. The domain was also raised in status from a jin'ya domain to a castle domain in 1850.

During the Bakumatsu period, the samurai of the domain were sharply divided between a conservative faction led by the 11th daimyō, Hori Naoyoshi, and a pro-Sonnō jōi faction. During the Boshin War, Hori Naoyoshi led the domain into the Ōuetsu Reppan Dōmei, but he switched sides after only a few months. In July 1871, with the abolition of the han system, Muramatsu Domain briefly became Muramatsu Prefecture, and was merged into the newly created Niigata Prefecture. Under the new Meiji government, Hori Naohiro, the final daimyō of Muramatsu Domain was given the kazoku peerage title of shishaku (viscount). The site of former Muramatsu Castle is now a park.

== Bakumatsu period holdings ==
As with most domains in the han system, Muramatsu Domain consisted of several discontinuous territories calculated to provide the assigned kokudaka, based on periodic cadastral surveys and projected agricultural yields.

- Echigo Province
  - 104 villages in Kambara District

== List of daimyō ==
#	Name	Tenure	Courtesy title	Court Rank	kokudaka	Notes
Hori clan (tozama) 1639–1871
1	Hori Naotoki (堀直時)	1639–1643	Tango-no-kami (丹後守)	Junior 5th Rank, Lower Grade (従五位下)	30,000 koku	
2	Hori Naoyoshi (堀直吉)	1643–1676	Tango-no-kami (丹後守)	Junior 5th Rank, Lower Grade (従五位下)	30,000 koku	
3	Hori Naotoshi (堀直利)	1676–1711	Tango-no-kami (丹後守)	Junior 5th Rank, Lower Grade (従五位下)	30,000 koku	
4	Hori Naoyuki (堀直為)	1711–1736	Ukyō-no-suke (左京亮)	Junior 5th Rank, Lower Grade (従五位下)	30,000 koku	
5	Hori Naotaka (堀直堯)	1736–1785	Tango-no-kami (丹後守)	Junior 5th Rank, Lower Grade (従五位下)	30,000 koku	
6	Hori Naonori (堀直教)	1785–1795	Ukyō-no-suke (左京亮)	Junior 5th Rank, Lower Grade (従五位下)	30,000 koku	
7	Hori Naokata (堀直方)	1795–1802	Ukyō-no-suke (左京亮)	Junior 5th Rank, Lower Grade (従五位下)	30,000 koku	
8	Hori Naoyasu (堀直庸)	1802–1819	Tango-no-kami (丹後守)	Junior 5th Rank, Lower Grade (従五位下)	30,000 koku	
9	Hori Naohide (堀直央)	1819–1857	Tango-no-kami (丹後守)	Junior 5th Rank, Lower Grade (従五位下)	30,000 koku	
10	Hori Naoyasu (堀直休)	1857–1860	Tango-no-kami (丹後守)	Junior 5th Rank, Lower Grade (従五位下)	30,000 koku	
11	Hori Naoyoshi (堀直賀)	1860–1868	Ukyō-no-suke (左京亮)	Junior 5th Rank, Lower Grade (従五位下)	30,000 koku	
12	Hori Naohiro (堀直弘)	1868–1871	-none-	Senior 5th Rank, Lower Grade (従五位下)	30,000 koku	

=== Hori Naotoki ===
Hori Naotoki (堀直時, 1616 – April 16, 1643) was the 1st daimyō of Yasuda Domain (Muramatsu). He was the second son of Hori Naoyori of Iiyama Domain in Shinano Province and received a 30,000 koku fief in Echigo Province on his father's death, becoming an independent daimyō. He was married to a daughter of Ikeda Nagayoshi of Bitchū-Matsuyama Domain, but died in 1643 at the age of 28 without an heir.

=== Hori Naoyoshi (d.1674) ===
Hori Naoyoshi (堀直吉, November, 1637 – November 30, 1674) was the 2nd daimyō of Yasuda Domain (Muramatsu). He was the second son of Hori Naotoki and became daimyō on his father's death in 1643. In May 1644 he relocated his seat from Yasuda to Muramatsu. He was married to a daughter of Hori Naotsugu of Murakami Domain. He died in 1674 after an uneventful tenure.

=== Hori Naotoshi ===
Hori Naotoshi (堀直利, February 3, 1658 – August 26, 1716) was the 3rd daimyō of Muramatsu Domain. He was the second son of Hori Naoyoshi and became daimyō on his father's death in 1676. In 1705 he served in the shogunal administration as a sōshaban and as jisha-bugyō. He was married to a daughter of Toda Mitsunaga of Kanō Domain. He retired from his offices in 1711 and died in 1716.

=== Hori Naoyuki ===
Hori Naoyuki (堀直為, November 15, 1698 – April 17, 1743) was the 4th daimyō of Muramatsu Domain. He was the second son of Hori Naotoshi and became daimyō on his father's retirement in 1716. He subsequently served as Osaka kaban. He was married to a daughter of Koide Fusasada of Sonobe Domain. He retired from his offices in 1736 and died in 1743.

=== Hori Naotaka ===
Hori Naotaka (堀直堯, October 27, 1717 – November 30, 1785) was the 5th daimyō of Muramatsu Domain. He was the eldest son of Hori Naoyuki and became daimyō on his father's retirement in 1736. He was married to a daughter of Matsudaira Yorisada of Moriyama Domain. He ruled to his death in 1785, outliving the first five of his sons.

=== Hori Naonori ===
Hori Naonori (堀直教, August 6, 1761 – October 21, 1812) was the 6th daimyō of Muramatsu Domain. He was the sixth son of Hori Naotaka and became daimyō on his father's death in 1785. He was married to a daughter of Matsudaira Yoritaka of Matsuyama Domain. He retired in 1795, appointing his nephew, the son of Hori Naoyasu, his eldest brother, as his heir. He died in 1812.

=== Hori Naokata ===
Hori Naokata (堀 直方, February 11, 1767 – August 17, 1805) was the 7th daimyō of Muramatsu Domain. He was the eldest son of Hori Naoyasu, the eldest son of Hori Naotaka and became daimyō on Naonori's retirement in 1795 without an heir. He was married to a daughter of Kinoshita Toshitane of Hiji Domain. He retired in 1802 and died three years later in 1805.

=== Hori Naoyasu (d.1819) ===
Hori Naoyasu (堀直庸, December 5, 1791 – November 27, 1819) was the 8th daimyō of Muramatsu Domain. He was the second son of Hori Naokata, and became daimyō on his father's retirement in 1802. He was married to a daughter of Inaba Hiromichi of Usuki Domain. In 1814, the peasants of the domain rose up in a widespread revolt against many ears of corruption and overtaxation by the hereditary karō and other domain officials. He died in 1819.

=== Hori Naohide ===
Hori Naohide (堀直央, July 30, 1797 – April 15, 1861) was the 9th daimyō of Muramatsu Domain. He was the third son of Hori Naokata, and became daimyō on his brother's death in 1819. He was married to a daughter of Tsugaru Yasuchika of Hirosaki Domain and later remarried to a daughter of Tsuchiya Hidenao of Tsuchiura Domain. His name is also read as Hori Naohisa. In 1843, he sponsored the reconstruction of the Ueno Daibutsu. In 1850, the status the domain was raised to that of a "castle-holding domain" by the Tokugawa shogunate, and he expanded Muramatsu jin'ya accordingly. From 1853, he worked on restructuring the domain's finance though a combination of domainal monopolies, agrarian reforms and fiscal restraint. The Ueno Daibutsu was severely damaged in the Ansei great earthquakes, and he again sponsored the rebuilding. He retired in 1857 and died in 1861.

=== Hori Naoyasu (d.1860) ===
Hori Naoyasu (堀直央, December 10, 1836 – August 28, 1860) was the 10th daimyō of Muramatsu Domain. He was the second son of Hori Naohide by a concubine, and became daimyō on his father's retirement in 1857. He was married to a daughter of Katō Yasumoto of Ōzu Domain. He continued his father's policies, but dropped suddenly dead while walking along a road in 1860.

=== Hori Naoyoshi (d.1903) ===
Hori Naoyoshi (堀直賀, November 15, 1843 – January 6, 1903) was the 11th daimyō of Muramatsu Domain. He was the grandson of Hori Naonori, and became daimyō on his father's sudden death in 1860. During the Bakumatsu period, the domain was violently divided between supporters of the Sonnō jōi movement and those of the shogunate. The domain did join the Ōuetsu Reppan Dōmei and sent forces in support of Nagaoka Domain during the Boshin War, many of which escaped to Yonezawa Domain after the Battle of Hokuetsu. The domain surrendered to the Meiji government in 1868. Hori Yayoshi was forced to retire. In 1877 he changed his surname to "Okuda". He died in 1910 and his grave is at Yanaka Cemetery in Tokyo.

=== Hori Naohiro ===
Hori Naohiro (堀直弘, March 24, 1861 – December 6, 1919) was the 12th (and final) daimyō of Muramatsu Domain. He was the third son of Hori Naoyasu, and became daimyō on his father's forced retirement in 1868. His wife was a daughter of the kuge Sawa Nobuyoshi. In 1869, he was appointed imperial governor of Muramatsu under the Meiji government, holding that post to the abolition of the han system in 1871. In 1877 he changed his surname to "Okuda". He subsequent received the kazoku peerage title of shishiku (viscount). He died in 1919.

== See also ==
- List of Han
