= Kisshō-ji =

Buddhist temple in Tokyo, Japan

Coordinates: 35°43′39″N 139°45′13″E

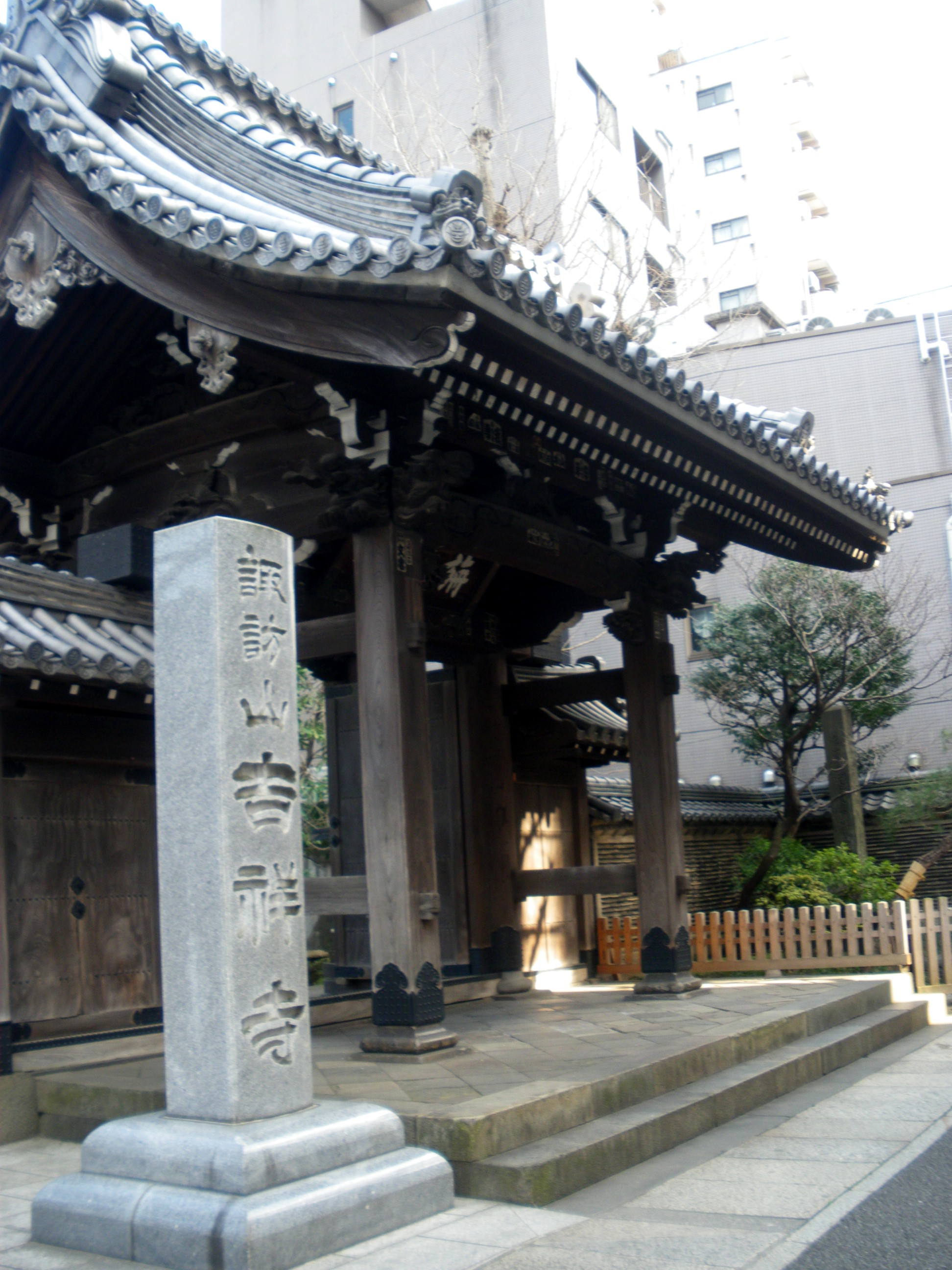
Temple gate

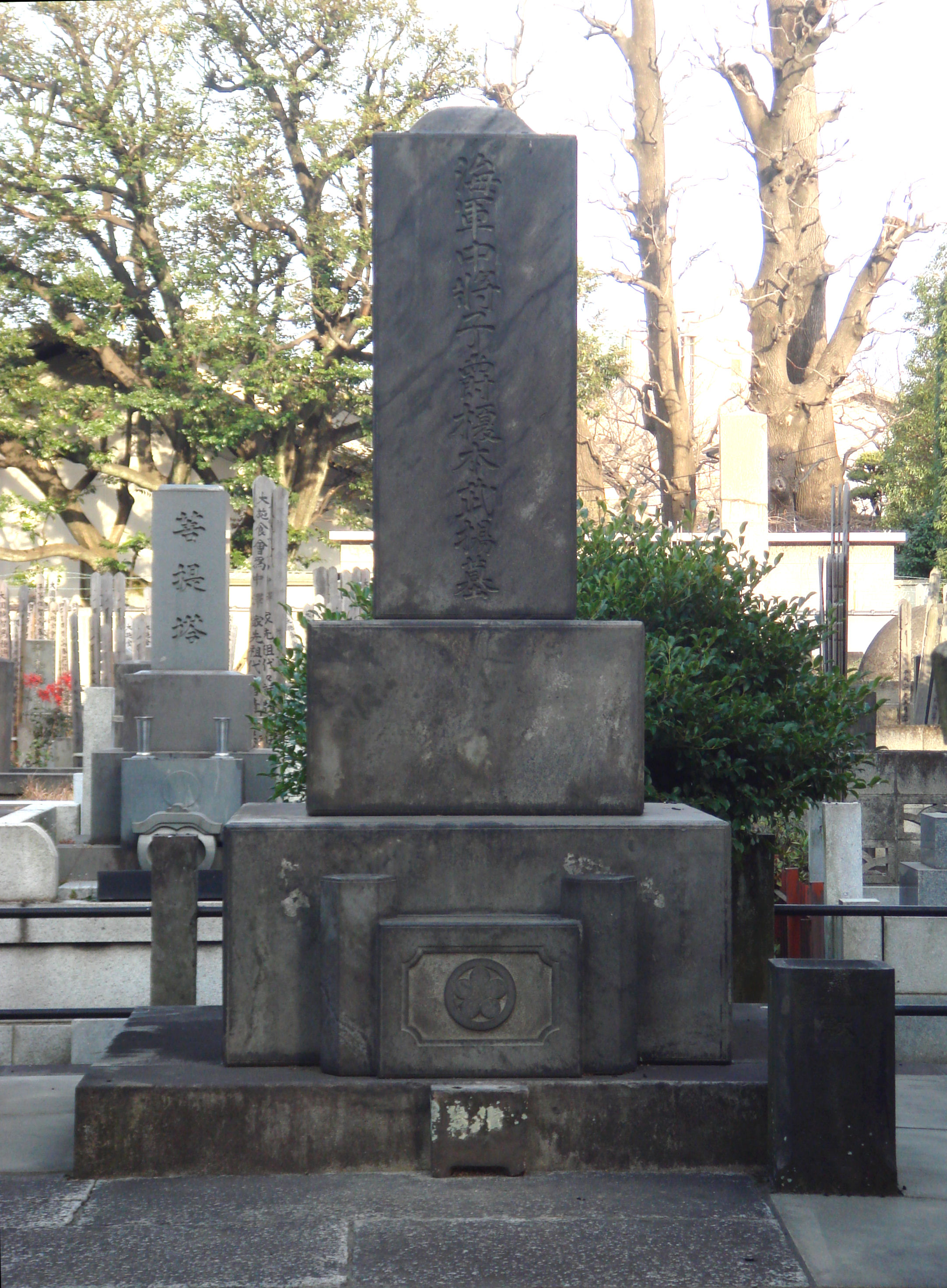
Tomb of Enomoto Takeaki

Kisshō-ji, also Kichijō-ji (吉祥寺) is a Buddhist Temple located in Bunkyo, Tokyo, Japan. It was founded in 1458, during the Muromachi period.

In 1592, the "Sendan-Rin" School for Buddhist monks was founded in the precincts of the temple. In 1905, the Sendan-Rin School was renamed Soto-shu University; in 1925 Soto-shu University became Komazawa University.

The temple is where Enomoto Takeaki was buried in 1908 at the age of 72.

== Location ==
- 3-19-17 Hon-Magome, Bunkyo-ku, Tokyo (東京都文京区本駒込3-19-17)
