= Mizoguchi clan =

Japanese samurai clan

Mizoguchi clan 溝口氏
- Mizoguchi clan emblem
- Home province: Owari Province
- Parent house: Takeda clan
- Titles: Count (hakushaku)
- Ruled until: 1871 (Abolition of the han system)

The Mizoguchi clan (溝口氏, Mizoguchi-shi) was a Japanese samurai clan who rose to prominence under the Edo period Tokugawa shogunate. The main branch of the clan ruled as daimyō of Shibata Domain in Echigo Province (100,000 koku) until the Meiji restoration, and was subsequently unbowed with the kazoku peerage title of hakushaku (count).

== Origins and Edo period history ==
The Mizoguchi were originally from Owari Province and were a cadet branch of the Takeda clan. Mizoguchi Hidekatsu was a retainer of Niwa Nagahide. His abilities came to the attention of Niwa's overlord, Oda Nobunaga, who granted him a 5000 koku fief in what is now Takahama, Fukui. Following Nobunaga's assassination, he entered the service of Toyotomi Hideyoshi and was active at the Battle of Shizugatake against Shibata Katsuie, for which he was granted a 44,000 koku estate in Kaga Province. In 1586, he was recognized by Hideyoshi as an independent daimyō and was even authorized to use the "Toyotomi" surname. During the Japanese invasions of Korea (1592–1598), he remained in Japan as part of the guard of Nagoya Castle. In 1598, he was transferred to Shibata and his kokudaka was increased to 60,000 koku. Following the Battle of Sekigahara, he was confirmed in his holdings by the Tokugawa shogunate.

The Mizoguchi ruled Shibata as tozama daimyō until the Meiji restoration. After the abolition of the han system in 1871, the final daimyō of Shibata, Mizoguchi Naomasa relocated to Tokyo and received the kazoku peerage title of hakushaku (Count) in 1884. The modern city of Shibata, Niigata continues to use the clan emblem of the Mizuguchi clan as its city seal to this day.
