= Kokushi (official) =

Provincial officials in Classical Japan

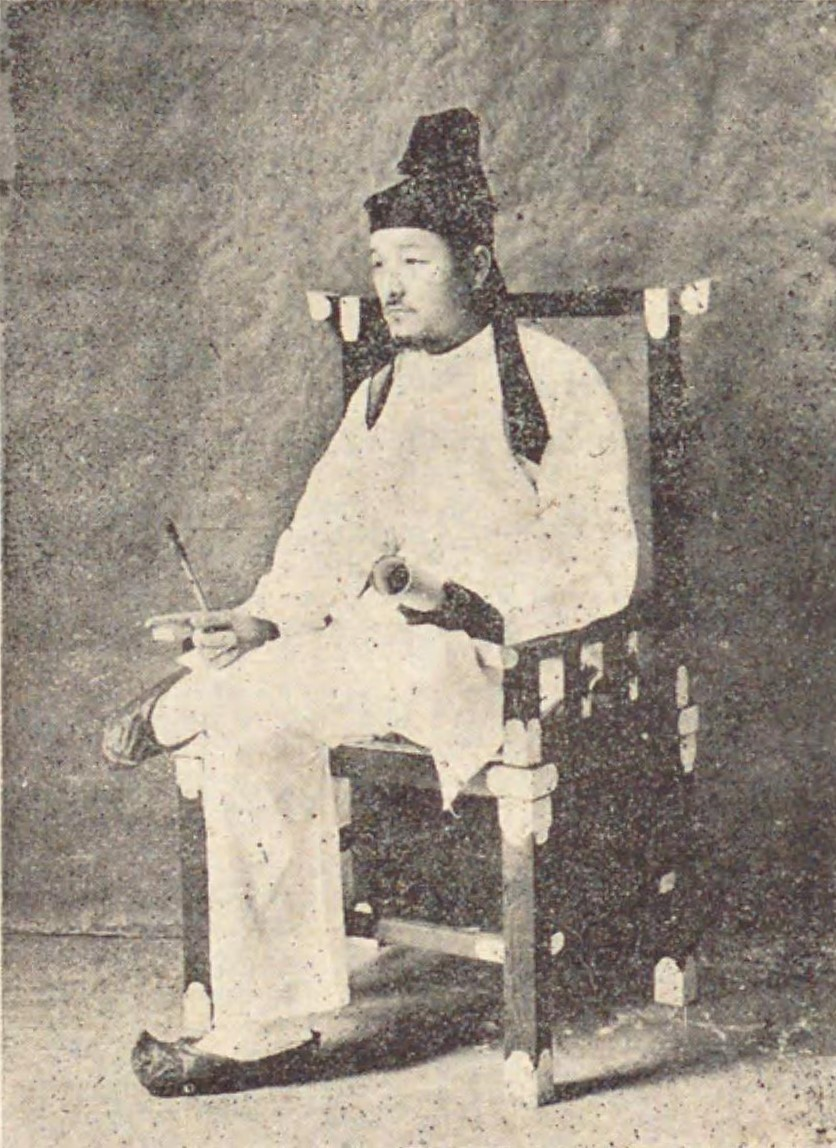
Re-enactment of a Taika era kokushi

Kokushi (国司; also read Kuni no tsukasa) were provincial officials in Classical Japan. They were nobles sent from the central government in Kyoto to oversee a province, a system that was established as part of the Taika Reform in 645, and enacted by the Ritsuryō system. There were four classes of kokushi, from the highest to the lowest: Kami (守), Suke (介), Jō (掾), and Sakan (目). In the Middle Ages, an acting governor called mokudai, the daikan of the kokushi, took over the local government of the province, while the kokushi returned to the capital to take on a supervising role.

== History ==
The oldest reference to the term kokushi appears in the seventeen-article constitution from 604. As part of the Taika Reform in 645, a new system of provincial government was established, marking the beginning of the kokushi. Before this, the governors were called mikotomochi (宰 or 使者). This term was replaced with the kanji characters 国 (province) and 司 (governor), and thus became known as kokushi.

The kokushi were divided into four classes (四等官, sitōkan), from the highest to the lowest: Kami (守), Suke (介), Jō (掾), and Sakan (目). Japan was divided into 66 provinces and two islands, and the number of kokushi officials and classes appointed to each province depended on which of the four provincial classes (dai, jō, chū, and ge) it belonged to.

They held considerable power, as they were in charge of the administration, finance, law, and military of the province. In the beginning, the term of office was six years, but later reduced to four years, with the exception of some special provinces. During the tenure, the kokushi received income through tax collection, and later received financial privileges that central government officials did not receive. As the ritsuryō system began to decline, the position of kokushi was seen as one type of income source.

In September 826, princes of the Imperial Family were appointed as kokushi in Kazusa Province, Hitachi Province and Kōzuke Province. These kami-class kokushi were called taishu, and as they did not leave the capital and work at their assigned province, provinces with no local governor were born. In contrast to this, kami who left the capital to occupy their local office became known as zuryō.

After the 10th century, following the instability and dissolution of the ritsuryō system, the former duties of district governors (gunji) and lower officials were taken over by the kokushi, making the kokushi even more powerful.

However, in response to the rising power of the kokushi, the district governors and commoners began fighting against the kokushi. Due to the ever strengthening resistance, the kokushi returned to the safety of the central government in Kyoto and appointed an acting governor (mokudai), the daikan of the kokushi, who governed the province locally while the kokushi took the role of a supervisor.

Following the establishment of local governments (rusudokoro) of the mokudai and the installation of provincial fiefdoms (chigyōkoku), the kokushi became a new category of manorial lords. As the Sesshō and Kampaku and Great Council Ministers were allowed to fill any vacant kami posts, and send their private deputies, the mokudai, to take care of the practical governing duties, the whole system of kokushi became increasingly corrupt. As the mokudai were also appointed from powerful local clans, the provincial government was drifting increasingly farther away from the central government in Kyoto.

After the Heian period, the highest official, kami, became also known as zuryō (受領). The term originally meant the change of office to a newly assigned kokushi.

In the Kamakura period, following the establishment of the Kamakura shogunate, the samurai formed their own provincial government, the shugo who were appointed by the shogun and shikken in contrast to the kokushi who were appointed by the Imperial Court. The shugo gradually usurped power away from the kokushi, becoming the de facto governors while the kokushi remained the de jure governors, though powerless titleholders in practice.

Even after the abolishment of medieval manors, politically, the kokushi remained as an honorific title until Meiji Restoration in 1868.

== See also ==
- Shugo
- Provinces of Japan
- Daikan
- Jitō
