= Echigo Province =

Former province of Japan

Map of Japanese provinces (1868) with Echigo Province highlighted

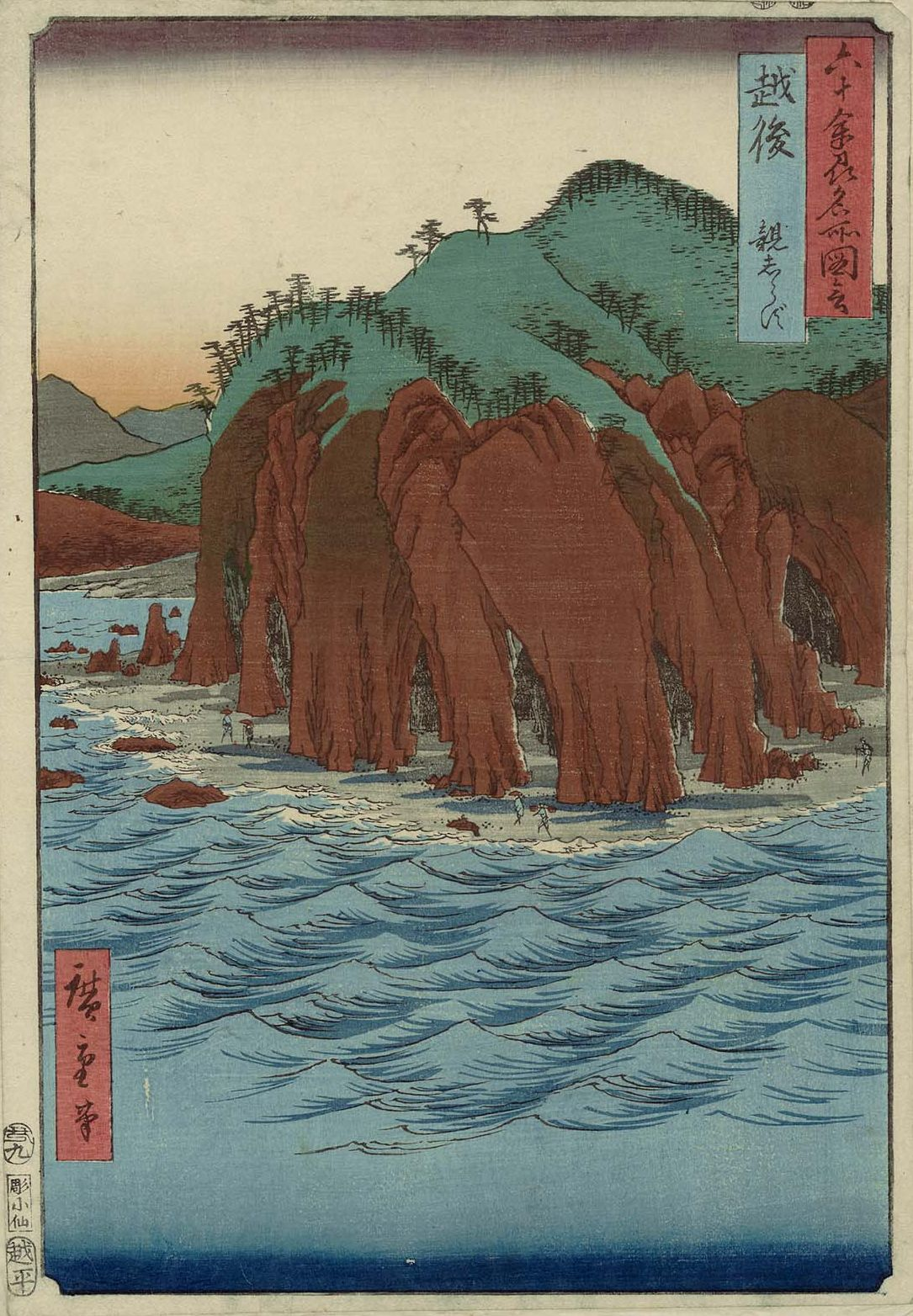
Hiroshige ukiyo-e " Echigo " in "The Famous Scenes of the Sixty States" (六十余州名所図会), depicting Oyashirazu cliffs.

Echigo Province (越後国, Echigo no Kuni) (Note: Japanese pronunciation: [é̞.c̟͡ɕì.ɡò̞ (nò̞ kɯ̈̀.ɲ̟ì), é̞.c̟͡ɕì.ŋò̞ (nò̞ kɯ̈̀.ɲ̟ì), è̞.c̟͡ɕí.ɡò̞ (nò̞ kɯ̈̀.ɲ̟ì), è̞.c̟͡ɕí.ŋò̞ (nò̞ kɯ̈̀.ɲ̟ì), è̞.c̟͡ɕí.ɡó̞ (nò̞ kɯ̈̀.ɲ̟ì), è̞.c̟͡ɕí.ŋó̞ (nò̞ kɯ̈̀.ɲ̟ì)]) was an old province in north-central Japan, on the shores of the Sea of Japan. It bordered on Uzen, Iwashiro, Kōzuke, Shinano, and Etchū Provinces. It corresponds today to Niigata Prefecture, minus the island of Sado.

Its abbreviated form name was Esshū (越州), with Echizen and Etchū Provinces. Under the Engishiki classification system, Echigo was ranked as one of the 35 "superior countries" (上国) in terms of importance, and one of the 30 "far countries" (遠国) in terms of distance from the capital Kyoto.

Echigo and Kōzuke Province were known as the Jōetsu region.

== History ==
In the late 7th century, during the reign of Emperor Monmu, the ancient province of Koshi Province (越国 or 古志国, Koshi no kuni) was divided into three separate provinces: Echizen, Etchū, and Echigo. The new Echigo Province consisted of Iwafune and Nutari Districts, and was one of two border provinces of the Yamato state with the Emishi (the other being Mutsu). In 702, Echigo was given the four districts of Kubiki, Koshi, Uonuma and Kanbara from Etchū. When Japan extended its territory northward in 708, Dewa District was established under Echigo. But this district was transformed into Dewa Province in 712. Sado Province was temporarily merged with Echigo between 743 and 752. Since the division of Sado in 752, the territory of Echigo remained constant to the Meiji period.

The provincial capital of Echigo was located in Kubiki District, in what is now the city of Jōetsu, but its exact location is now unknown. The temple of Gochikokubun-ji (五智国分寺), also in Jōetsu, claims to be the successor of the provincial temple of Echigo Province; however, its records date only to 1562 when it was relocated to its present location by Uesugi Kenshin. Two Shinto shrines vie for the title of ichinomiya of Echigo Province: Yahiko Shrine in Yahiko, and Kota Shrine in Jōetsu.

Echigo was ruled directly by the Hōjō clan during the Kamakura period, followed by the Uesugi clan from the start of the Muromachi period to the late Sengoku period. Under the Tokugawa shogunate of the Edo period, Echigo was divided among several feudal domains. The Hokurikudō highway passed through the province, and numerous post stations were established. The port of Niigata was also of major importance in the coastal kitamaebune trading system.

The area became a battleground during the Battle of Hokuetsu in the Boshin War of the Meiji Restoration. Following the establishment of the Meiji government, the various domains and provinces became prefectures with the abolition of the han system in 1871. These various prefectures merged to form Niigata Prefecture in 1876.

== Historical districts ==
Echigo Province consisted of fifteen districts:

- Niigata Prefecture
  - Dewa District (出羽郡) - split off to become Dewa Province
  - Iwafune District (岩船郡)
  - Kanbara District (蒲原郡)
    - Higashikanbara District (東蒲原郡)
    - Kitakanbara District (北蒲原郡)
    - Minamikanbara District (南蒲原郡)
    - Nakakanbara District (中蒲原郡) - dissolved
    - Nishikanbara District (西蒲原郡)
  - Koshi District (古志郡) - formerly part of Etchū Province; now dissolved
    - Kariwa District (刈羽郡) - split from Koshi District during Heian period, formerly known as Mishima District
    - Santō District (三島郡) - split from Koshi District during Edo period
  - Kubiki District (頸城郡) - formerly part of Etchū Province
    - Higashikubiki District (東頸城郡) - dissolved
    - Nakakubiki District (中頸城郡) - dissolved
    - Nishikubiki District (西頸城郡) - dissolved
  - Nuttari District (沼垂郡) - merged into Kanbara District (period unknown)
  - Uonuma District (魚沼郡) - formerly part of Etchū Province
    - Kitauonuma District (北魚沼郡) - dissolved
    - Minamiuonuma District (南魚沼郡)
    - Nakauonuma District (中魚沼郡)

== Bakumatsu period domains ==
Name	type	daimyō	kokudaka	notes
Murakami Domain	fudai	Naitō	50,000 koku	
Kurokawa Domain	fudai	Yanagisawa	10,000 koku	
Mikkaichi Domain	fudai	Yanagisawa	10,000 koku	
Shibata Domain	tozama	Mizoguchi	50,000 koku	
Muramatsu Domain	tozama	Hori	30,000 koku	
Yoita Domain	fudai	Ii	20,000 koku	
Nagaoka Domain	fudai	Makino	110,000 koku	
Mineyama Domain	fudai	Makino	11,000 koku	
Shiiya Domain	fudai	Hori	10,000 koku	
Takada Domain	fudai	Yanagihara	150,000 koku	
Itoigawa Domain	shinpan	Matsudaira	10,000 koku	
