= 1747 =

1747 in various calendars
- Gregorian calendar: 1747; MDCCXLVII
- Ab urbe condita: 2500
- Armenian calendar: 1196; ԹՎ ՌՃՂԶ
- Assyrian calendar: 6497
- Balinese saka calendar: 1668–1669
- Bengali calendar: 1153–1154
- Berber calendar: 2697
- British Regnal year: 20 Geo. 2 – 21 Geo. 2
- Buddhist calendar: 2291
- Burmese calendar: 1109
- Byzantine calendar: 7255–7256
- Chinese calendar: 丙寅年 (Fire Tiger); 4444 or 4237 — to — 丁卯年 (Fire Rabbit); 4445 or 4238
- Coptic calendar: 1463–1464
- Discordian calendar: 2913
- Ethiopian calendar: 1739–1740
- Hebrew calendar: 5507–5508
- Hindu calendars
- Vikram Samvat: 1803–1804
- Shaka Samvat: 1668–1669
- Kali Yuga: 4847–4848
- Holocene calendar: 11747
- Igbo calendar: 747–748
- Iranian calendar: 1125–1126
- Islamic calendar: 1159–1160
- Japanese calendar: Enkyō 4 (延享４年)
- Javanese calendar: 1671–1672
- Julian calendar: Gregorian minus 11 days
- Korean calendar: 4080
- Minguo calendar: 165 before ROC 民前165年
- Nanakshahi calendar: 279
- Thai solar calendar: 2289–2290
- Tibetan calendar: མེ་ཕོ་སྟག་ལོ་ (male Fire-Tiger); 1873 or 1492 or 720 — to — མེ་མོ་ཡོས་ལོ་ (female Fire-Hare); 1874 or 1493 or 721

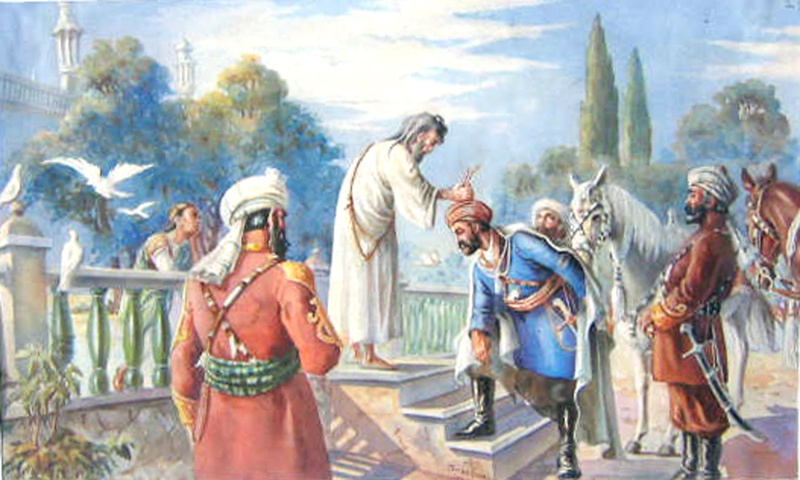
July 23: Ahmad Shah Durrani is crowned as king of Afghanistan.

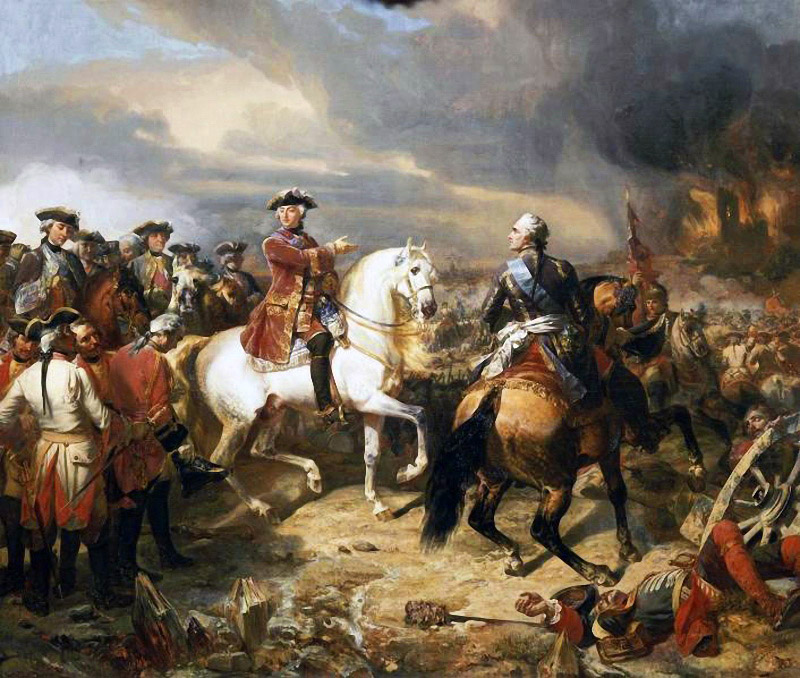
July 2: France wins the Battle of Lauffeld over Allied troops.(1836 painting The Battle of Lauffeld by Auguste Couder)

1747 (MDCCXLVII) was a common year starting on Sunday of the Gregorian calendar and a common year starting on Thursday of the Julian calendar, the 1747th year of the Common Era (CE) and Anno Domini (AD) designations, the 747th year of the 2nd millennium, the 47th year of the 18th century, and the 8th year of the 1740s decade. As of the start of 1747, the Gregorian calendar was 11 days ahead of the Julian calendar, which remained in localized use until 1923.

== Events ==
=== January–March ===
- January 31 – The first venereal diseases clinic opens at London Lock Hospital.
- February 11 – King George's War: A combined French and Indian force, commanded by Captain Nicolas Antoine II Coulon de Villiers, attacks and defeats British troops at Grand-Pré, Nova Scotia.
- March 7 – Juan de Arechederra the Spanish Governor-General of the Philippines, combines his forces with those of Sultan Azim ud-Din I of Sulu to suppress the rebellion of the Moros in the Visayas.
- March 19 – Simon Fraser, the 79-year old Scottish Lord Lovat, is convicted of high treason for being one of the leaders of the Jacobite rising of 1745 against King George II of Great Britain and attempting to place the pretender Charles Edward Stuart on the throne. After a seven day trial of impeachment in the House of Lords and the verdict of guilt, Fraser is sentenced on the same day to be hanged, drawn and quartered; King George alters Fraser's punishment to beheading, which is carried out publicly on April 9.

=== April–June ===
- April 9 – The Scottish Jacobite Lord Lovat is beheaded at Tower Hill, London, for high treason. He was the last person in Britain to be beheaded, although beheading would not be formally abolished until more than 200 years later.
- May 14 – War of the Austrian Succession – First battle of Cape Finisterre: The British Navy defeats a French fleet.
- June 9 – Emperor Momozono ascends to the throne of Japan, succeeding Emperor Sakuramachi.
- June 24–October 14 – The English ships Dobbs galley and California, under Captains William Moore and Francis Smith, explore Hudson Bay, discovering there is no Northwest Passage by this route.

=== July–September ===
- July 2 – War of the Austrian Succession – Battle of Lauffeld: France defeats the combined armies of Hanover, Great Britain and the Netherlands.
- July 23 – Ahmad Shah Durrani establishes the Durrani Empire after being elected by Pashtun chieftains in a jirga at Naderabad, laying the foundation for modern Afghanistan.
- August 15 – Great Britain, Russia and the Dutch Republic sign the Convention of Saint Petersburg (1747).
- August 24 – Seyyid Abdullah Pasha, the Turkish Governor of Cyprus, becomes the new Grand Vizier of the Ottoman Empire and serves until 1750.
- September 13 – The Netherlands city of Bergen op Zoom falls to the Army of France after a 70 day siege during the War of the Austrian Succession.
- September 21 – A hurricane in the Caribbean Sea sinks 11 British ships, most of them off the coast of Saint Kitts.

=== October–December ===
- October 21 – King George II transfers Thomas Herring, Archbishop of York, to become the new Archbishop of Canterbury, three days after the death of John Potter
- October 24 – A Caribbean Sea hurricane sweeps across Saint Kitts, sinking 12 British freighters and one from France.
- October 25 – War of the Austrian Succession – Second battle of Cape Finisterre: The British Navy again defeats a French fleet.
- November 9 – Rioters in Amsterdam demand governmental reform.
- November 17–19 – The Knowles Riot breaks out in Boston, Massachusetts, protesting impressment into the British Royal Navy.
- November 22 – End of Second Stadtholderless period: Prince William IV of Orange becomes stadtholder of all the United Provinces.
- December 7 – Benjamin Franklin forms the Pennsylvania Associators, the first militia in the colony of Pennsylvania, which had no standing militia because of its foundation by pacifistic Quakers.
- December 13 – The ordeal of the Maryland freighter sloop Endeavour begins when the ship departs Annapolis for the West Indies and encounters a hurricane. With its masts and rigging torn away, the ship drifts for six months before finally ending up at the island of Tiree off the coast of Scotland
- December 27 – The Parliament of Great Britain amends its Naturalisation Act 1740 to extend recognition to all non-Anglican Protestant denominations in its colonies.

=== Date unknown ===
- James Lind's experiment begins to prove that citrus fruits prevent scurvy.
- War of the Austrian Succession: Spanish troops invade and occupy the coastal towns of Beaufort and Brunswick in the Royal Colony of North Carolina, during what becomes known as the Spanish Alarm. They are later driven out by the local militia.
- Samuel Johnson begins work on A Dictionary of the English Language in London.

== Births ==
- January 10 – Abraham-Louis Breguet, Swiss horologist, inventor (d. 1823)
- January 15 – John Aikin, English doctor and writer (d. 1822)
- January 19 – Johann Elert Bode, German astronomer (d. 1826)
- February 21 – Eugenio Espejo, Ecuadorian scientist (d. 1795)
- February 28 – Justin Morgan, American horse breeder and composer (d. 1798)

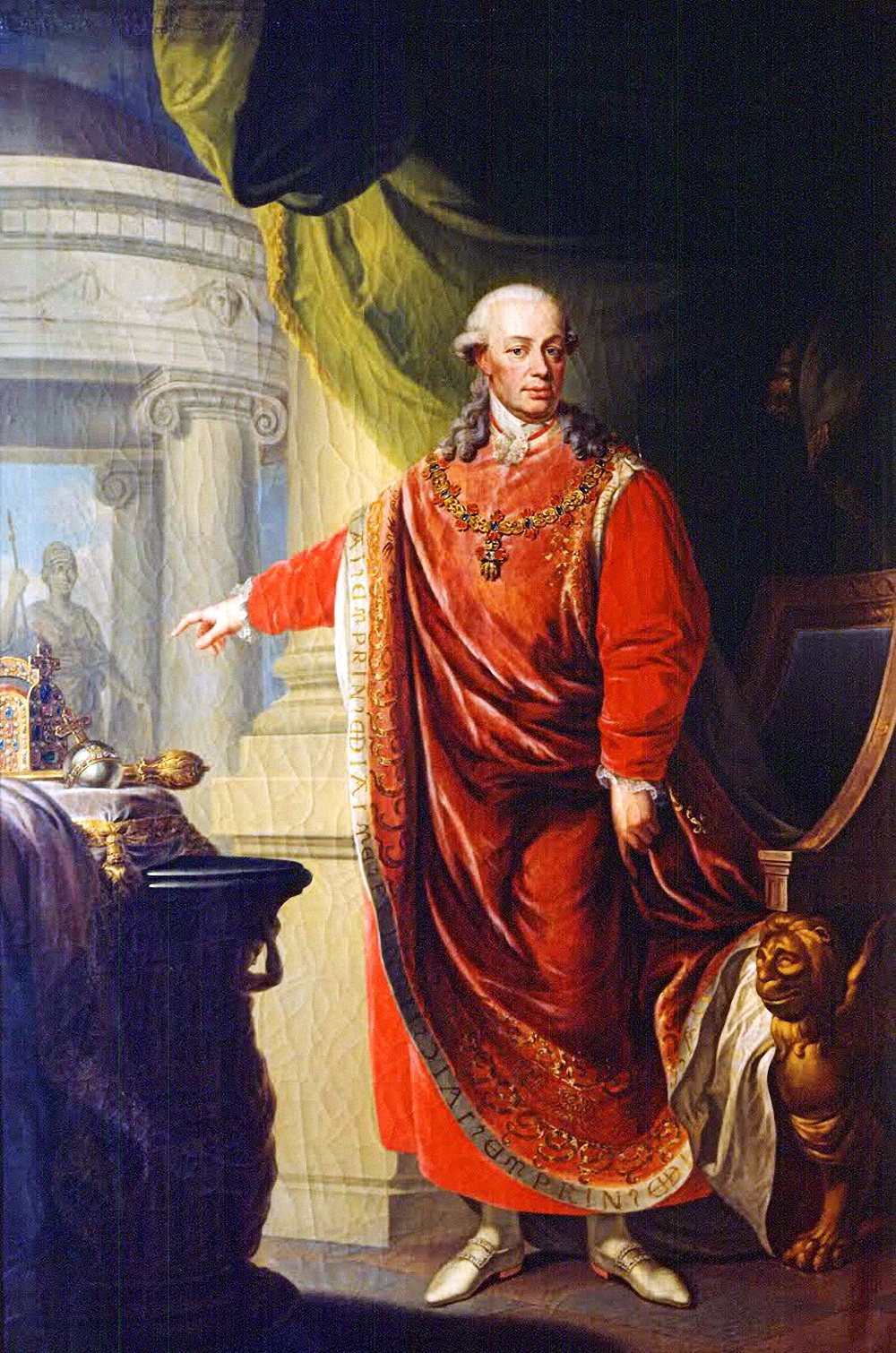
Leopold II, Holy Roman Emperor

- May 5 – Leopold II, Holy Roman Emperor (d. 1792)
- May 7 – Judith van Dorth, Dutch Orangist (d. 1799)
- June 23 – Michele Troja, Italian physician (d. 1827)
- July 2 – Rose Bertin, French fashion designer (d. 1813)
- July 6 – John Paul Jones, American naval captain (d. 1792)
- September 9 – Thomas Coke, first American Methodist Bishop (d. 1814)
- October 8 – Jean-François Rewbell, French politician (d. 1807)
- September 12 – Caleb Brewster, Patriot spy during the American Revolutionary War (d. 1827)
- December 12 – Anna Seward, English writer (d. 1809)
- December 31 – Gottfried August Bürger, German poet (d. 1794)
- date unknown
  - François Tourte, French musical instrument maker (d. 1835)
  - Francis Salvador, American patriot (d. 1776)
  - Anne Pépin, Senegalese Signara (d. 1837)
  - Grigory Shelikhov, Russian merchant (d. 1795)

== Deaths ==
- January 2 – Lord George Graham, Royal Navy officer and MP (b. 1715)
- January 16 – Barthold Heinrich Brockes, German poet (b. 1680)
- January 26 – Willem van Mieris, Dutch painter (b. 1662)
- March 2 – Margravine Sophie Charlotte of Brandenburg-Bayreuth, German noble (b. 1713)
- March 14 – Johann Matthias von der Schulenburg, German aristocrat and general (b. 1661)
- March 16 – Christian Augustus of Anhalt-Zerbst, father of Catherine the Great (b. 1690)
- March 23 – Claude Alexandre de Bonneval, French soldier (b. 1675)
- April 2 – Johann Jacob Dillenius, German botanist (b. 1684)
- April 3 – Francesco Solimena, Italian painter (b. 1657)
- April 7 – Leopold I, Prince of Anhalt-Dessau, Prussian field marshal (b. 1676)
- April 9 – Simon Fraser, 11th Lord Lovat, Scottish clan chief (b. c. 1667)
- April 14 – Jean-Frédéric Osterwald, Swiss Protestant pastor (b. 1663)
- May 9 – John Dalrymple, 2nd Earl of Stair, Scottish soldier and diplomat (b. 1673)
- May 28 – Luc de Clapiers, marquis de Vauvenargues, French writer (b. 1715)
- May 31 – Andrei Osterman, Russian statesman (b. 1686)
- June 8 – Alan Brodrick, 2nd Viscount Midleton, English cricketer (b. 1702)
- June 17 – Avdotya Chernysheva, Russian noble, lady in waiting (b. 1693)

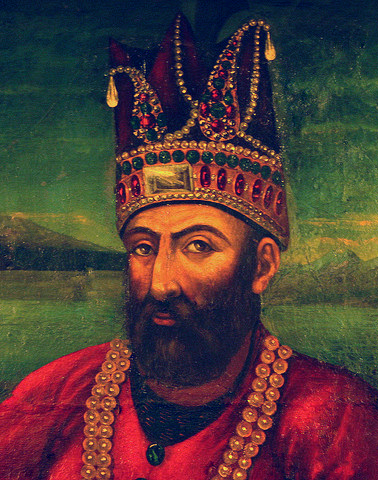
Nader Shah

- June 19
  - Nader Shah, Persian leader (b. 1688)
  - Alessandro Marcello, Italian composer (b. 1669)
- July 9 – Giovanni Bononcini, Italian composer (b. 1670)
- October 7 – Giulia Lama, Italian painter (b. 1681)
- October 9 – David Brainerd, American missionary (b. 1718)
- October 10 – John Potter, Archbishop of Canterbury (b. c. 1674)
- October 4 – Amaro Pargo, Spanish corsair (b. 1678)
- November 17 – Alain-René Lesage, French writer (b. 1668)
- December 2 – Vincent Bourne, English classical scholar (b. 1695)

== See also ==
- List of 1747 Holy Roman Empire incumbents
