= Tokugawa Ieharu =

Military ruler of Japan from 1760 to 1786

Senior First Rank Tokugawa Ieharu
- 徳川 家治
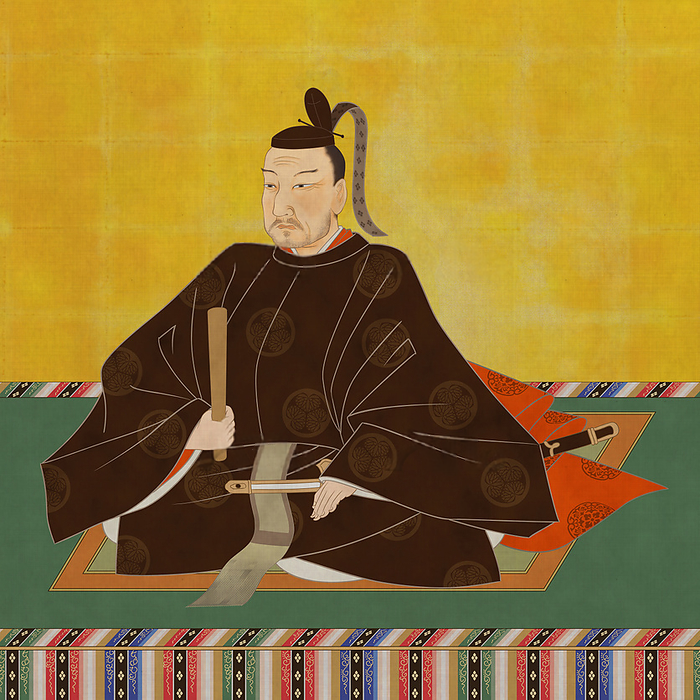

Shōgun
- In office 31 October 1760 – 25 June 1786
- Monarchs: Momozono; Go-Sakuramachi; Go-Momozono; Kōkaku
- Preceded by: Tokugawa Ieshige
- Succeeded by: Tokugawa Ienari

Personal details
- Born: 20 June 1737 Edo, Tokugawa shogunate (now Tokyo, Japan)
- Died: 17 September 1786 (aged 49) Sunpu Castle, Shizuoka, Tokugawa shogunate
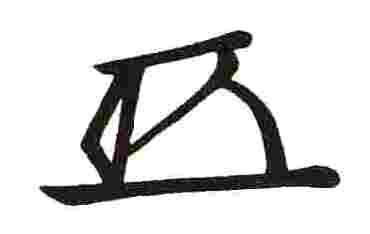
- Signature

Tokugawa Ieharu (Japanese: 徳川 家治 20 June 1737 – 17 September 1786) was the tenth shōgun of the Tokugawa shogunate of Japan, and held office from 1760 until his death in 1786.

Ieharu was the eldest son of Tokugawa Ieshige, and succeeded his father upon his abdication in 1760. His childhood name was Takechiyo (竹千代).

Ieharu died in 1786. He was given the Buddhist name Shunmyoin and buried at Kan'ei-ji.

== Family ==
- Father: Tokugawa Ieshige
- Mother: Oko no Kata (d. 1728) later Shinshin'in
- Wife: Iso no Miya Tomoko (1738–1771)
- Concubines:
  - Omiyo no Kata
  - Ochiho no Kata (1737–1791) later Renkoin
  - Oshina no Kata (d. 1778) later Yoren-in
- Child:
  - Chiyohime (1756–1757) by Tomoko
  - Manjuhime (1761–1773) (born by Tomoko but after she died adopted by Ieharu's concubine, Omaki no Kata)
  - Tokugawa Takechiyo later Tokugawa Iemoto (1762–1779) born by Ochiho no Kata
  - Tokugawa Teijiro (1762–1763) born by Oshina no Kata
- Adopted:
  - Tokugawa Ienari
  - Tanehime (1765–1794), daughter of Tokugawa Munetake and married Tokugawa Harutomi of Kishū Domain

== Events of Ieharu's reign ==
- Tenmei gannen (天明元年) or Tenmei 1 (1781): The new era name of Tenmei (meaning "Dawn") was created to mark the enthronement of Emperor Kōkaku. The previous era ended and the new one commenced in An'ei 11, on the 2nd day of the 4th month. According to Nihon Ōdai Ichiran, Ieharu was appointed Udaijin (Minister of the Right) of the Emperor's Kugyō, which was quite rare and considered a great favour.
- Tenmei 2 (1782): Great Tenmei Famine begins.
- Tenmei 2 (1782): An analysis of silver currency in China and Japan "Sin sen sen pou (Sin tchuan phou)" was presented to the emperor by Kutsuki Masatsuna (1750–1802), also known as Kutsuki Oki-no kami Minamoto-no Masatsuna, hereditary daimyō of Oki and Ōmi with holdings in Tanba and Fukuchiyama -- related note at Tenmei 7 below.
- Tenmei 3 (1783): Mount Asama (浅間山, Asama-yama) erupted in Shinano, one of the old provinces of Japan (Tenmei eruption). Isaac Titsingh's published account of the Asama-yama eruption (1820) was the first of its kind in the West. The volcano's devastation makes the Great Tenmei Famine even worse.
- Tenmei 4 (1784): Country-wide celebrations in honor of Kūkai (also known as Kōbō-Daishi, founder of Shingon Buddhism) who died 950 years earlier.
- Tenmei 4 (1784): The son of the shōgun's chief counselor was assassinated inside Edo Castle. The comparatively young wakadoshiyori, Tanuma Yamashiro-no-kami Okitomo, was the son of the senior wakadoshiyori Tanuma Tonomo-no-kami Okitsugu. The younger Tanuma was killed in front of his father as both were returning to their litter after a meeting of the Counselors of State had broken up. The involvement of senior figures in the bakufu was suspected; however, none but the lone assassin himself, Sano Masakoto, was punished. The result was that Tanuma-initiated, liberalizing reforms within the bakufu and relaxation the strictures of sakoku were blocked.
- Tenmei 6, on the 8th day of the 9th month (17 September 1786): Death of Tokugawa Ieharu. He is buried in Edo.
- Tenmei 7 (1787): Kutsuki Masatsuna published Seiyō senpu (Notes on Western Coinage), with plates showing European and colonial currency – related note at Tenmei 2 above. – see online image of 2 adjacent pages from library collection of Kyoto University of Foreign Studies and Kyoto Junior College of Foreign Languages

== Eras of Ieharu's reign ==
The years in which Ieharu was shōgun are more specifically identified by more than one era name or nengō.

- Hōreki (1751–1764)
- Meiwa (1764–1772)
- An'ei (1772–1781)
- Tenmei (1781–1789)

== Ancestry ==
Ancestors of Tokugawa Ieharu

16. Tokugawa Yorinobu, 1st daimyō of Kishū (1602-1671)
8.Tokugawa Mitsusada, 2nd daimyō of Kishū (1627-1705)
17. Nakagawa-dono
4. Tokugawa Yoshimune, 8th Tokugawa Shōgun (1684-1751)
9. Jōenin (1655-1726)
2. Tokugawa Ieshige, 9th Tokugawa Shōgun (1712-1761)
20. Kanō Hisashi
10.Ōkubo Tadanao (d. 1726)
5. Shintokuin (1688-1713)
22. Ōkubo Tadafuru (d. 1646)
11. Ōkubo
1. Tokugawa Ieharu, 10th Tokugawa Shōgun
24. Umetani Suemichi (1615-1658)
12. Umetani Hidemichi (1650-1718)
6. Umetani Mitsunaga (1672-1740)
26. Kanroji Tsugunaga (1611-1650)
13. Kanroji
27. Minase
3. Shinshin'in (d. 1748)
28. Kanroji Tsugunaga (1611-1650)
14. Kanroji Katanaga (1649-1694)
29. Minase
7. Kanroji
30. Honda Yasumasa, 3rd daimyō of Zeze (1622-1691)
15. Honda

== Notes ==
Military offices
Preceded by Tokugawa Ieshige	Shōgun: Tokugawa Ieharu; 1760–1786	Succeeded by Tokugawa Ienari
