= Prince Fushimi Sadamochi =

Second son of Emperor Momozono of Japan

- 伏見宮貞行親王
- Born: Ni-no-miya; 9 April 1760; Kyoto, Japan
- Died: 20 July 1772 (aged 12); Kyoto
- Resting place: Shōkoku-ji
- Occupation: a member of the Imperial Family
- Title: His Imperial Highness
- Parents: Emperor Momozono (father); Tomiko Ichijō (mother); Prince Fushimi Kunitada (adoptive father)

Prince Fushimi Sadamochi (伏見宮貞行親王, Fushimi-no-miya Sadamochi-Shinnō, 9 April 1760 – 20 July 1772) was a member of the Imperial Family, the second son of the 116th Emperor Momozono, the 17th head of the Fushimi-no-miya (伏見宮家) line of shinnōke cadet branches of the Imperial Family of Japan on 30 July 1760. The honi (Court rank) was Nihon.

== Life ==
Prince Sadamochi was a son of the Emperor Momozono and Tomiko Ichijō. His elder brother was the Emperor Go-Momozono. His childhood name was "Ni-no-miya (二宮)". Only about three months after birth, he was adopted by the late Prince Fushimi Kunitada, and inherited the Fushimi-no-miya on 30 July 1760. On 4 October 1763, he was given the title of Imperial Prince and named "Sadamochi". In 1765, he lost his eyesight due to an eye disease. On 17 July 1772, he fell into a critical condition. On the same day, he was given the honi of Nihon. He died three days later on the early morning of the 20th.

== Burial place and Mausoleum ==
The burial place is Fushimi-no-miya Cemetery in the precincts of Shōkoku-ji Temple in Kyoto, and his posthumous name is "Shinjomyo-in (新浄明院)". In addition, his soul has been enshrined in the Koreiden (皇霊殿) of the Imperial Palace along with successive Emperors and other Imperial Families.

== Background of his inheritance of Fushimi-no-miya ==
=== Imperial system in the Edo period ===
In the Edo period, there were four Seshū Shinnōke (四親王家), including Fushimi-no-miya. Seshū Shinnōke was the collective name for the four cadet branches of the Imperial Family, which were entitled to provide a successor to the Imperial throne if the main line failed to produce an heir. Unlike the modern Imperial system, the number of households was fixed at four, so Imperial families, other than the heir to the Imperial throne or the head of the shinnōke, had no choice but to be Buddhist monks or adopted children of peers. The heads of these shinnōke became adopted children of the reigning Emperor or the Emperor Emeritus, and given the title of Imperial Prince, regardless of their genealogical distance from the reigning Emperor, as the term seshū in their designation meant. Therefore, there was a problem that the blood relationship with the current Emperor became more and more estranged with the passage of time.

=== Death of the Prince Kunitada ===
On 2 June 1759, the Prince Kunitada, the 16th head of Fushimi-no-miya, died. He had no successor. Fushimi-no-miya had continued a direct inheritance since the Muromachi period, and was a venerable family that was allowed to call itself "Fushimi-dono" by the 102nd Emperor Go-Hanazono. Therefore, the officers of Fushimi-no-miya pleaded with the Imperial court to allow their actual relatives to inherit Fushimi-no-miya under his will.

At the imperial court, the following three proposals were discussed:

- A: make the Emperor's son an heir as his adopted child.
- B: make the younger brother of the late Prince Kunitada the heir.
- C: make a member of another Shinnōke the heir as his adopted child.

Of these, Plan C was immediately rejected because it was unprecedented. Some nobles expressed their support for Plan A, but at that time the Emperor Momozono had only one son, Crown Prince Hidehito (later the Emperor Go-Momozono). On the other hand, the late Prince Kunitada had two younger brothers, the Prince Sonpo and the Prince Sonshin, both of whom had already become Buddhist monks. Monks are not allowed to inherit the Shinnōke, but there was no precedent for a former monk to inherit. Therefore, when the Imperial court consulted with the Edo Shogunate, the Shogunate responded that it would support Plan A.

At that time, Tomiko Ichijō, wife of the Emperor Momozono, was pregnant with the Emperor's second child, who became the Prince Sadamochi. That was why the Prince Sadamochi inherited Fushimi-no-miya when after he was born soon. For the Emperor Momozono, it was a good result because the blood relationship with the branch family was approaching, but for the officers of Fushimi-no-miya who could not maintain the direct inheritance, their pride was greatly hurt.

== Fushimi-no-miya inheritance problem after his death ==
In 1772, the Prince Sadamochi died, and the problem of succession resurfaced at Fushimi-no-miya.

As before, the Imperial court announced that they make the Emperor's son the heir as the adopted son of the late Prince Sadamochi. However, at that time, the Emperor Go-Momozono was only 14 years old and had no children. Furthermore, in 1770, the Prince Kinhito, who was the ninth head of Katsura-no-miya (another shinnōke), died without an heir. At that time, the Imperial court had already decided to make the Emperor's second son the heir of Katsura-no-miya. Therefore, the inheritance of Fushimi-no-miya had to wait until the birth of the third son of the Emperor Go-Momozono. Fushimi-no-miya officers vehemently opposed the Imperial court's decision. Then, they wanted to welcome the late Prince Kunitada's younger brother, the Prince Sonpo, who was a chief monk of Kajū-ji temple, as the heir of Fushimi-no-miya. Fortunately, Fushimi-no-miya had a close relationship with the Tokugawa family. Therefore, they made full use of their personal connections and urged the Shogunate to recommend the Prince Sonpo as the heir. The Shogunate broke the precedent, and insisted on the Imperial court that Prince Sonpo should be laicised and inherit of Fushimi-no-miya because nobody know when the third son of the Emperor would be born. In response, the Imperial court proposed that the members of Kan'in-no-miya, the closest shinnōke to the Emperor, be the heirs, but the Shogunate rejected this. Thus, on 13 November 1774, the Prince Sonpo ceased to be a Buddhist monk and became the 18th head of Fushimi-no-miya, changing his name to "Kuniyori". In this way, the direct succession of Fushimi-no-miya had been revived, and it continued until the 26th head, the Prince Hiroaki left the Imperial register on 14 October 1947.

== Evaluation ==
Yanagiwara Norimitsu, a noble, described Prince Sadamochi as an intelligent and excellently clever. However, there is no record of any special childhood achievement of the Prince, so the credibility of this description is questionable.

== Episode ==
His older brother, the Emperor Go-Momozono, developed eye disease in 1773 after suffering from smallpox.
