= Hōreki =

Period of Japanese history (1751–1764)

Hōreki (宝暦), also known as Horyaku, was a Japanese era name (年号, nengō, "year name") after Kan'en and before Meiwa. The period spanned the years from October 1751 through June 1764. The reigning emperor and empress were Momozono-tennō (桃園天皇) and Go-Sakuramachi-tennō (後桜町天皇).

== Change of era ==
- 1751 Hōreki 1 (宝暦元年): The new era of Hōreki (meaning "Valuable Calendar" or "Valuable Almanac") was said to have been created to mark the death of the retired Emperor Sakuramachi and the death of the former shōgun Tokugawa Yoshimune.

The previous era could be said to have ended and the new era is understood to have commenced in Kan'en 4, on the 27th day of the 10th month; however, this nengō was promulgated retroactively. The Keikō Kimon records that the calendar was amended by Imperial command, and the era was renamed Hōreki on December 2, 1754, which then would have become 19th day of the 10th month of the 4th year of Hōreki.

== Events of the Hōreki era ==
- 1752 (Hōreki 2): An ambassador arrived from the Ryūkyū Kingdom.
- 1754 (Hōreki 4): The Hōreki River Improvement Incident
- 1758 (Hōreki 8): The Hōreki incident involved a small number of kuge who favored a restoration of Imperial power; and this was construed as a threat by the shogunate.
- 1760 (Hōreki 10): Shogun Ieshige resigns and his son, Ieharu, becomes the 10th shogun of the Tokugawa shogunate.
- 1762 (Hōreki 12): The Emperor Momozono abdicated in favor of his sister; and he died shortly thereafter.
- 1763 (Hōreki 13): A merchant association handling Korean ginseng is founded in the Kanda district of Edo.
- 1764 (Hōreki 14): Sweet potatoes are exported from Edo to Korea. The food crop in Korea is the result of a diplomatic mission.

== Notes ==
Preceded by Kan'en (寛延)	Era or nengō Hōreki (宝暦); 1751–1764	Succeeded by Meiwa (明和)
