= Haruaki =

- Gender: Male

Origin
- Origin: Japanese
- Meaning: Different meanings depending on the kanji used

Haruaki (written: 治昭 or 治察) is a masculine Japanese given name. Notable people with the name include:

- Hachisuka Haruaki (蜂須賀 治昭) (1758–1814), Japanese daimyō
- Tokugawa Haruaki (徳川 治察) (1753–1774), Japanese samurai
