= Tokugawa Yoshimune =

Japanese Samurai, Daimyo and Military ruler of Japan from 1716 to 1745

Senior First Rank Tokugawa Yoshimune
- 徳川 吉宗

Shōgun
- In office 3 September 1716 – 20 October 1745
- Monarchs: Nakamikado; Sakuramachi
- Preceded by: Tokugawa Ietsugu
- Succeeded by: Tokugawa Ieshige

Personal details
- Born: 27 November 1684 Kii Province, Tokugawa shogunate (now Japan)
- Died: 12 July 1751 (aged 66) Edo, Tokugawa shogunate (now Tokyo, Japan)
- Spouse: Masako-Joō
- Children: Tokugawa Ieshige; Tokugawa Munetake; Tokugawa Genjo; Tokugawa Munetada; Yoshihime
- Parent: Tokugawa Mitsusada (father)
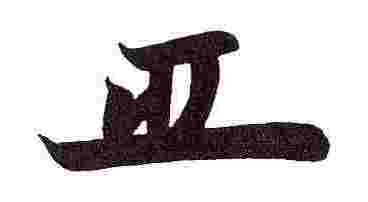
- Signature

Tokugawa Yoshimune (Note: Japanese pronunciation: [to.kɯꜜ.ɡa.wa | jo.ɕiꜜ.mɯ.ne, to.kɯ.ɡa.wa jo.ɕiꜜ.mɯ.ne, -ŋa.wa-]) (徳川 吉宗; 27 November 1684 – 12 July 1751) was a Japanese samurai, daimyo and the eighth shōgun of the Tokugawa shogunate of Japan, ruling from 1716 until his abdication in 1745. He was the son of Tokugawa Mitsusada, the grandson of Tokugawa Yorinobu, and the great-grandson of Tokugawa Ieyasu. Yoshimune is known for repealing the ban on Western literature.

== Lineage ==
Yoshimune was not the son of any former shōgun. Rather, he was a member of a cadet branch of the Tokugawa clan. Tokugawa Ieyasu, the founder of the Tokugawa shogunate, well aware of the extinction of the Minamoto line in 1219, had realized that his direct descendants might die out, leaving the Tokugawa family at risk of extinction. Thus, while his son Tokugawa Hidetada was the second shōgun, he selected three other sons to establish the gosanke, hereditary houses which would provide a shōgun if there were no male heir. The three gosanke were the Owari, Kii, and Mito branches.

Yoshimune was from the branch of Kii. The founder of the Kii house was one of Tokugawa Ieyasu's sons, Tokugawa Yorinobu. Ieyasu appointed him daimyō of Kii. Yorinobu's son, Tokugawa Mitsusada, succeeded him. Two of Mitsusada's sons succeeded him, and when they died, Tokugawa Yoshimune, Mitsusada's fourth son, became daimyō of Kii in 1705. Later, he became shōgun.

Yoshimune was closely related to the Tokugawa shōguns. His grandfather, Tokugawa Yorinobu, was a brother of second shōgun Tokugawa Hidetada, while Yoshimune's father, Tokugawa Mitsusada, was a first cousin of third shōgun Tokugawa Iemitsu. Yoshimune thus was a second cousin to the fourth and fifth shōguns (both brothers) Tokugawa Ietsuna and Tokugawa Tsunayoshi, as well as a second cousin to Tokugawa Tsunashige, whose son became shōgun Tokugawa Ienobu.

== Early life (1684–1716) ==
Tokugawa Yoshimune was born in 1684 in the rich Kii Province, a region which was then ruled by his father, Tokugawa Mitsusada. Yoshimune's childhood name was Tokugawa Genroku (徳川 源六). At that time, his second cousin Tokugawa Tsunayoshi was ruling in Edo as shōgun. Kii was a rich region of over 500,000 koku, but it was still in debt and had a lot to pay back to the shogunate.

In 1697, Genroku underwent the rites of passage and took the name Tokugawa Shinnosuke (徳川 新之助). In 1705, when Shinnosuke was just 21 years old, his father Mitsusada and two older brothers died. Thus, the ruling shōgun Tokugawa Tsunayoshi appointed him daimyō of Kii. He took the name Tokugawa Yorikata (頼方) and began to administer the province. Nonetheless, great financial debt which the domain had owed to the shogunate since his father's and even grandfather's time continued to burden the finances. What made things worse was that in 1707, a tsunami destroyed and killed many in the coastal areas of Kii Province. Yorikata did his best to try to stabilize things in Kii, but relied on leadership from Edo.

In 1712, Shogun Ienobu died, and was succeeded by his son, the boy-shōgun Tokugawa Ietsugu. Yorikata decided that he could not rely on conservative Confucianists like Arai Hakuseki in Edo and did what he could to stabilize Kii Domain. Before he could implement changes, shōgun Ietsugu died in early 1716. He was only seven years old, and died without an heir. The bakufu thus selected the next shōgun from one of the cadet lines.

== Family ==
- Father: Tokugawa Mitsusada
- Mother: Oyuri no Kata later Jōenin (1655–1726)
- Half siblings:
  - Tokugawa Tsunanori (1665–1705) 4th daimyō of Kishū and married Tsuruhime, daughter of 5th shōgun Tokugawa Tsunayoshi
  - Jirokichi
  - Tokugawa Yorimoto (1680–1705) 5th daimyō of Kishū
  - Sakae-Hime married Uesugi Tsunanori of Yonezawa Domain
  - Norihime married Ichijō Kaneteru
  - Tsunahime
  - Ikuhime married Satake Yoshimitsu
- Wife: Fushimi-no-Miya Masako (1691–1710) later Kantokuin
- Concubines:
  - Osuma no Kata (1688–1713) later Shintokuin
  - Okon no Kata (1696–1723) later Hontokuin
  - Oume no Kata later Shinshin'in (1700–1721)
  - Okume no Kata later Kakujuin (1697–1777)
  - Osatsu no Kata
- Children:
  - Tokugawa Ieshige born by Osuma no Kata
  - Tokugawa Munetake by Okon no Kata
  - Tokugawa Genjo (1719–1720) by Oume
  - Tokugawa Munetada born by Oume
  - Yoshihime (1721–1722) later Denjuin by Okume
- Illegitimate Son: Tenichi (mother was Shirabyoshi; sentenced to death during Yoshimune's reign)
- adopted daughters:
  - Tonehime, married Date Munemura of Sendai Domain
  - Takehime (1705–1772), daughter of Hirosada Seikan'in and adopted by Tokugawa Tsunayoshi and married Shimazu Tsugutoyo of Satsuma Domain later known as Joganin has 1 daughter, Kikuhime

== Shōgun (1716–1745) ==
Yoshimune succeeded to the post of the shōgun in Shōtoku-1 (1716). His term as shōgun lasted for 30 years. He is considered among the best of the Tokugawa shōguns.

Yoshimune established the gosankyō to augment (or perhaps to replace) the gosanke. Two of his sons, together with the second son of his successor Ieshige, became the founders of the Tayasu, Hitotsubashi and Shimizu lines. Unlike the gosanke, they did not rule domains. Still, they remained prominent until the end of Tokugawa rule, and some later shōguns were chosen from the Hitotsubashi line.

Yoshimune is known for his financial reforms. He dismissed the conservative adviser Arai Hakuseki and he began what would come to be known as the Kyōhō Reforms.

Yoshimune also tried to resurrect the Japanese swordsmithing tradition. Since the beginning of the Edo period, it was quite difficult for smiths to make a living and to be supported by daimyōs, because of the lack of funds. But Yoshimune was quite unhappy with this situation, causing a decline of skills. And so, he gathered smiths from daimyō fiefs for a great contest, in 1721. The four winners who emerged were all great masters, Mondo no Shō Masakiyo (主水正正清), Ippei Yasuyo (一平安代), the 4th generation Nanki Shigekuni (南紀重国) and Nobukuni Shigekane (信国重包). But it did not work well to arouse interest, quite like tournaments in modern Japan.

Yoshimune also ordered the compilation of Kyōhō Meibutsu Chō (享保名物帳), listing the best and most famous swords all over Japan. This book allowed the beginning of the Shinshintō period of Nihontō history, and indirectly contributed to the Gassan school, who protected the Nihontō tradition before and after the surrender of Japan.

Although foreign books had been strictly forbidden since 1640, Yoshimune relaxed the rules in 1720, starting an influx of foreign books and their translations into Japan, and initiating the development of Western studies, or rangaku. Yoshimune's relaxation of the rules may have been influenced by a series of lectures delivered before him by the astronomer and philosopher Nishikawa Joken. Engravement or official sanction of Chinese medical volume Taiping Huìmín Héjì Júfāng 『太平恵民和剤局方』 appears to have happened around this time.

== Ōgosho (1745–1751) ==
In 1745, Yoshimune retired, took the title Ōgosho and left his public post to his oldest son. The title is the one that Tokugawa Ieyasu took on retirement in favor of his son Hidetada, who in turn took the same title on his retirement.

Yoshimune died on the 20th day of the 5th month of the year Kan'en-4 (12 July 1751). His Buddhist name was Yutokuin and he was buried in Kan'ei-ji.

== Eras of Yoshimune's rule ==
The years in which Yoshimune was shōgun are more specifically identified by more than one era name or nengō.

- Shōtoku (1711–1716)
- Kyōhō (1716–1736)
- Genbun (1736–1741)
- Kanpō (1741–1744)
- Enkyō (1744–1748)

== Ancestry ==
Ancestors of Tokugawa Yoshimune

8. Tokugawa Ieyasu, 1st Tokugawa Shōgun (1543-1616)
4. Tokugawa Yorinobu, 1st daimyō of Kishū (1602-1671)
9. Yōjuin (1580-1653)
2. Tokugawa Mitsusada, 2nd daimyō of Kishū (1627-1705)
5. Nakagawa-dono
1. Tokugawa Yoshimune, 8th Tokugawa Shōgun
3. Jōenin (1655-1726)

== Notes ==
Royal titles
| Preceded by Tokugawa Yorimoto | Lord of Kishū: Tokugawa Yoshimune; 1716–1745 | Succeeded by Tokugawa Munenao |
Military offices
| Preceded by Tokugawa Ietsugu | Shōgun: Tokugawa Yoshimune; 1716–1745 | Succeeded by Tokugawa Ieshige |
