= Shōtoku =

Shōtoku may refer to:

- Prince Shōtoku (574-622), a politician of the Asuka period
- Empress Kōken, or Empress Shōtoku (718-770), the 48th imperial ruler of Japan
- Shōtoku (era) (1711–1716), a Japanese era
