= Tokugawa Ieshige =

Military ruler of Japan from 1745 to 1760

Senior First Rank Tokugawa Ieshige
- 徳川 家重
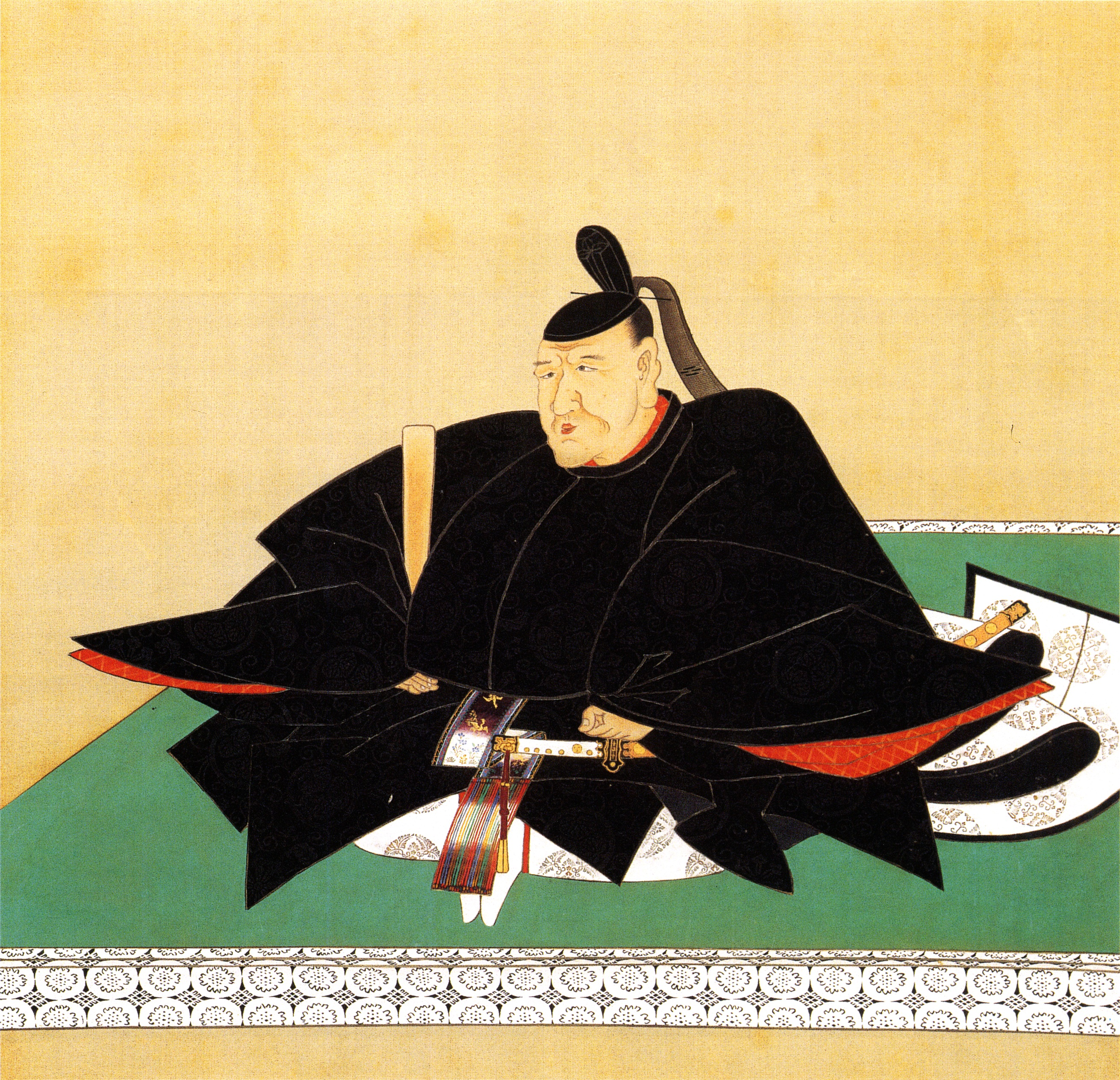

Shōgun
- In office 31 October 1745 – 25 June 1760
- Monarchs: Sakuramachi; Momozono
- Preceded by: Tokugawa Yoshimune
- Succeeded by: Tokugawa Ieharu

Personal details
- Born: 28 January 1712 Minato, Edo, Tokugawa shogunate (now Tokyo, Japan)
- Died: 13 July 1761 (aged 49) Edo, Tokugawa shogunate
- Children: Tokugawa Ieharu; Tokugawa Shigeyoshi
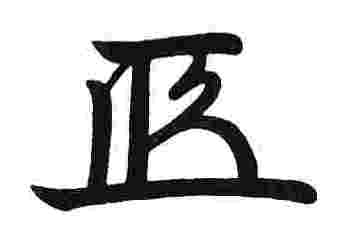
- Signature

Tokugawa Ieshige (徳川 家重; 28 January 1712 – 13 July 1761) was a Japanese samurai and daimyo, who served as the ninth shōgun of the Tokugawa shogunate of Japan.

The first son of Tokugawa Yoshimune, his mother was the daughter of Ōkubo Tadanao, known as Osuma no kata. His mother died in 1713 when he was only 2 years old, so he was raised by Yoshimune's concubine, Okon no Kata; Okon later gave birth to Tokugawa Munetake, so he was raised by another of Yoshimune's concubines, Okume no Kata, as her biological son.

His childhood name was Nagatomi-maru (長福丸). He underwent the genpuku coming-of-age ceremony in 1725. His first wife, Nami-no-miya, was the daughter of Prince Fushimi-no-miya Kuninaga (伏見宮 邦永親王). In 1733, Nami-no-Miya Masuko had a miscarriage and died. His second wife, Okō, was the daughter of one of the courtiers who had followed his first wife from the Imperial Court to the Shogunal Court in Edo. This famously good-natured second wife was the mother of Ieharu, who would become Ieshige's heir. In Enkyō 2 or 1745, Ieshige was made shogun.

Ieshige suffered from chronic ill health and a severe speech defect which rendered his speaking nearly incomprehensible. Yoshimune's choice of Ieshige as his heir created considerable controversy within the shogunate as his younger brothers Tokugawa Munetake and Tokugawa Munetada appeared to be far more suitable candidates. Yoshimune continued to insist on his decision, favoring the Confucian principle of primogeniture; and Ieshige continued in the role of formal head of the shogunate. Yoshimune directed affairs after his official retirement in 1745. This attention was designed to ensure that Ieshige was secure in his office. Ieshige remained shogun until 1760.

Uninterested in government affairs, Ieshige left all decisions in the hands of his chamberlain, Ōoka Tadamitsu (1709–1760). He officially retired in 1760 and assumed the title of Ōgosho, appointed his first son Tokugawa Ieharu as the 10th shōgun, and died the following year.

Ieshige's second son Tokugawa Shigeyoshi became the founder of the Shimizu Tokugawa clan, which together with the Tayasu and Hitotsubashi (established by Ieshige's younger brothers) became the gosankyō, three cadet branches of the Tokugawa family from which future shoguns might be selected if the main line were to die out. They joined the existing three cadet branches, the gosanke, to which Ieshige's father Yoshimune had been born.

Ieshige's reign was beset by corruption, natural disasters, periods of famine and the emergence of the mercantile class, and his clumsiness in dealing with these issues greatly weakened the rule of Tokugawa.

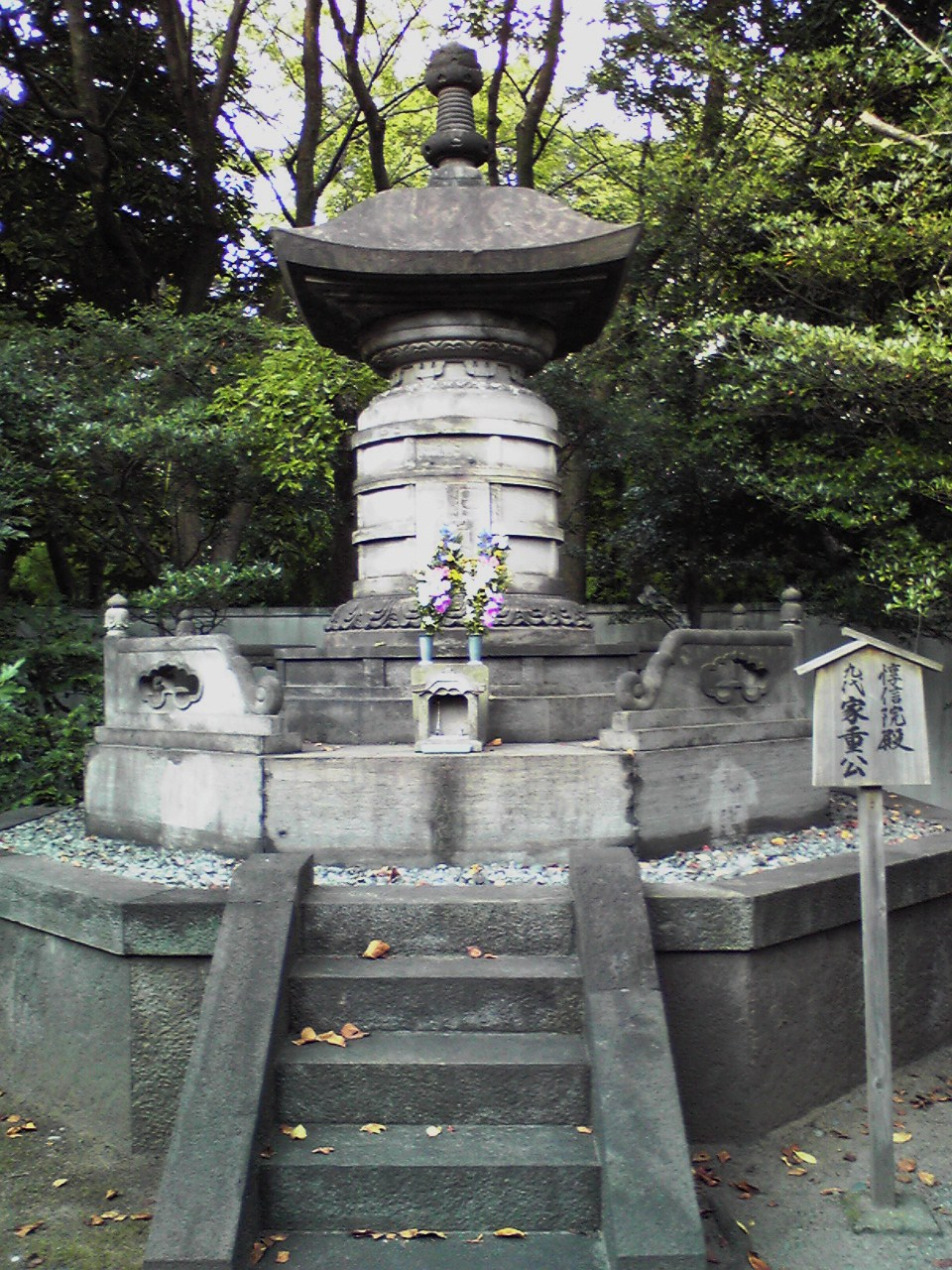
Ieshige's commemorative memorial at Zōjō-ji

Ieshige died in 1761. His posthumous title is Junshin-in; and his grave is at the Tokugawa family mausoleum at Zōjō-ji in Shiba. His remains were disinterred and underwent scientific investigation from 1958 to 1960. It was discovered that his teeth were crooked and badly deformed, confirming historical references to his speech defect.

== Family ==
- Father: Tokugawa Yoshimune
- Mother: Osuma no Kata (1688–1713)
- Adopted Mother: Okume no Kata later Kakuju-in (1697–1777)
- Wife: Nami-no-Miya Masuko (1711–1733) later Shōmei'in and buried in Kan'ei-ji
- Concubines:
  - Oko no Kata later Shinshin'in (d. 1748)
  - Oshizu no Kata
  - Oyu no Kata (1721–1789) later Ansho-in
- Children:
  - Tokugawa Ieharu born by Oko no Kata
  - Tokugawa Shigeyoshi born by Oitsu no Kata

== Eras during Ieshige's rule ==
The years in which Ieshige was shogun are more specifically identified by more than one era name or nengō.

- Enkyō (1744–1748)
- Kan'en (1748–1751)
- Hōreki (1751–1764)

== Ancestry ==
Ancestors of Tokugawa Ieshige

8. Tokugawa Yorinobu, 1st daimyō of Kishū (1602-1671)
4. Tokugawa Mitsusada, 2nd daimyō of Kishū (1627-1705)
9. Nakagawa-dono
2. Tokugawa Yoshimune, 8th Tokugawa Shōgun (1684-1751)
5. Jōenin (1655-1726)
1. Tokugawa Ieshige, 9th Tokugawa Shōgun
12. Kanō Hisashi
6. Ōkubo Tadanao (d. 1726)
3. Shintokuin (1688-1713)
14. Ōkubo Tadafuru (d. 1646)
7. Ōkubo

== Notes ==
Military offices
Preceded by Tokugawa Yoshimune	Shōgun: Tokugawa Ieshige; 1745–1760	Succeeded by Tokugawa Ieharu
