= Empress Go-Sakuramachi =

Empress of Japan from 1762 to 1771

Empress Go-Sakuramachi 後桜町天皇
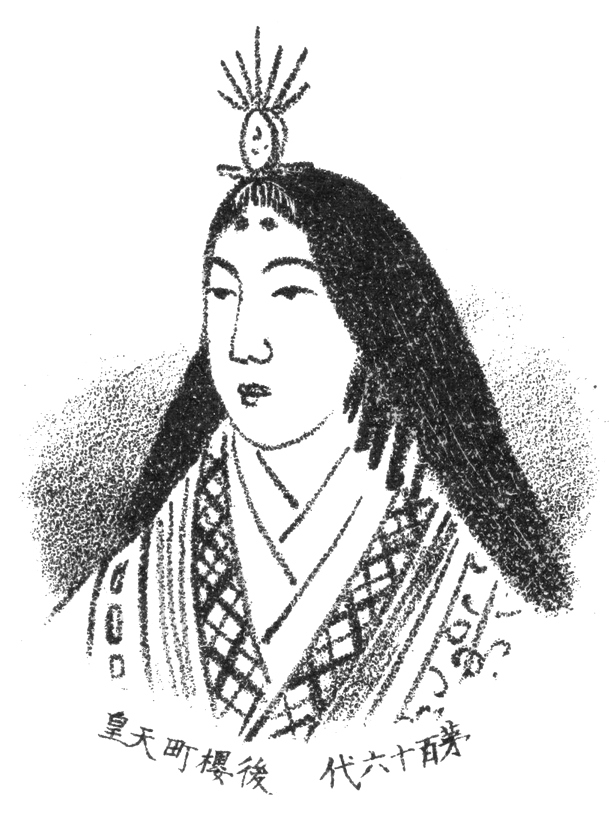

Empress of Japan
- Reign: 15 September 1762 – 9 January 1771
- Enthronement: 31 December 1763
- Predecessor: Momozono
- Successor: Go-Momozono
- Shōgun: Tokugawa Ieharu (1762–1771)
- Born: Toshiko (智子); 23 September 1740; Tokugawa shogunate
- Died: 24 December 1813 (aged 73); Sentō Imperial Palace, Tokugawa shogunate
- Burial: Tsuki no wa no misasagi, Kyoto
- Issue: Emperor Kōkaku (adopted)
Posthumous name
- Tsuigō: Empress Go-Sakuramachi (後桜町院 or 後桜町天皇)
- House: Imperial House of Japan
- Father: Emperor Sakuramachi
- Mother: Nijō Ieko
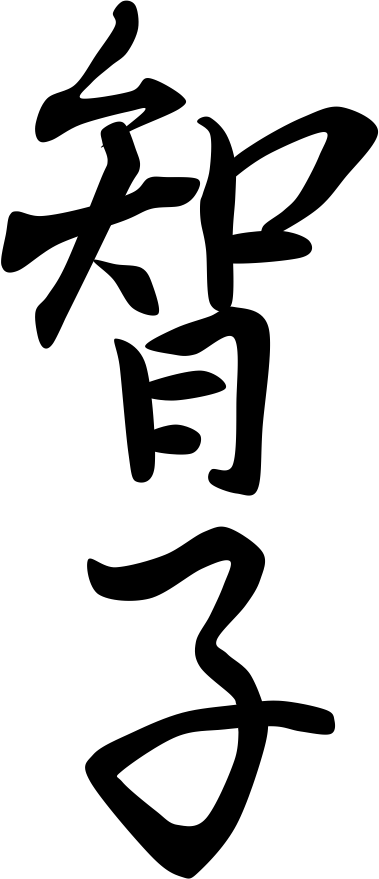
- Signature

Empress Go-Sakuramachi (Japanese: 後桜町天皇, Hepburn: Go-Sakuramachi-tennō; 23 September 1740 – 24 December 1813), personal name Toshiko, was the 117th monarch of Japan, according to the traditional order of succession. She was named after her father Emperor Sakuramachi, with the word go (後) before her name translating in this context as "later" or "second one", also referred to as "Sakuramachi II". Her reign during the Edo period spanned the years from 1762 through to her abdication in 1771. As of 2026, she remains the most recent Japanese empress regnant.

== Birth and pre-reign ==
Empress Go-Sakuramachi was born Princess Toshiko (智子) to Emperor Sakuramachi and Nijō Ieko in 1740. She was the middle of three children, Princess Noriko, older, who died age 10 and Prince Toohito, younger, later Emperor Momozono. Her father died when she was young, and so the Tokugawa shogunate granted her mother some land, and gave the princess herself 300 koku of land as there was no intention for her to enter a nunnery.

Her brother was sickly and had only one child, a young boy. It was unusual for the emperor to come to the throne without the backing of a Daijō Tennō, the retired emperor, and so Momozono named his sister as his heir in his will. The emperor's death was hidden for a day and due to the urgency of the situation, since she was the last lineal descendent of Emperor Nakamikado, the court did not alert the shōgunate in Edo beforehand about their decision.

The top clans in the country secretly met with each other to confirm their support for Toshiko as Momozono's successor. In 1762 Go-Sakuramachi came to the throne.

== Reign ==
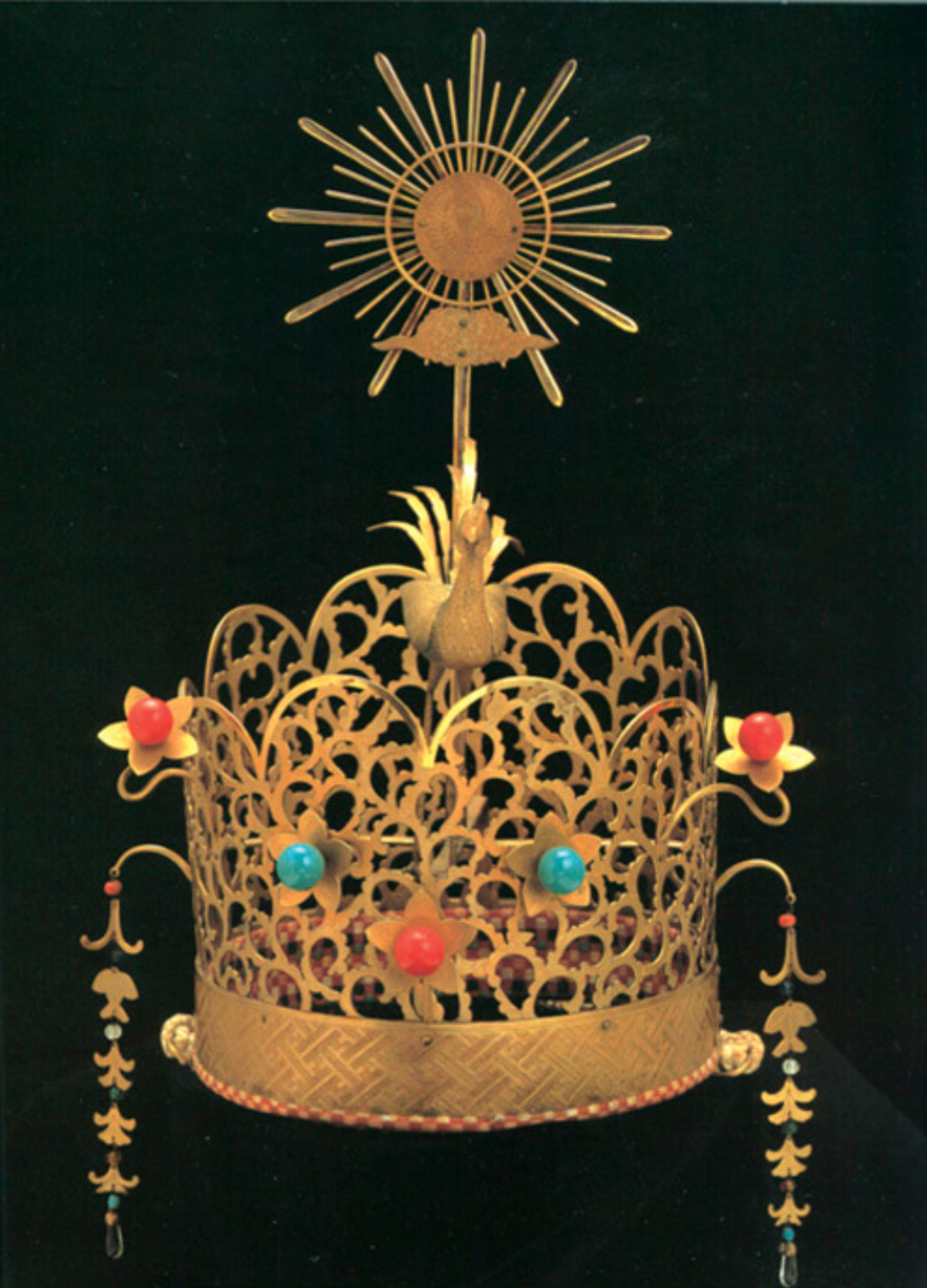
Imperial Crown of Empress Go-Sakuramachi

Her reign was contested by some nobles, including commander Nomiya Sadaharu who argued that it was unusual to enthrone a female emperor in modern times, and that Go-Sakuramachi's female predecessor, Empress Meishō, could not count as precedence for a modern female emperor since she was an "example from a strange and degenerate age". He lamented "Alas, this is a time when the royal way has declined and fallen into decay in the latter days", further saying "It has never been heard of that a younger brother should cede the imperial throne to his elder sister or brother". He finally wrote of his anger that it was "as if his mind and spirit were torn asunder". Her enthronement crown caused the enthronement to be postponed, as the crown of the previous female emperor, Meishō, had been lost. It was suggested the crown of Empress Shōtoku be used, but regent Konoe Uchisaki rejected this, and so a crown based on one worn on a statue of Tokugawa Masako was made instead.

The Seishi Gusho, which spans over 500 years of imperial history notes that her enthronement ceremony and the following rituals such as the Daijosai were mostly the same as male emperors and she even wore robes with dragons on them to her Daijōsai. However, aside from new years ceremonies she rarely attended court rituals. Aside from this, the only really significant thing in her reign was an unsuccessful plot to overthrow the shōgun, and while not directly linked or involved, she may have shared some of the pro imperial/nationalist sentiments.

== Post-abdication ==
In 1771, she abdicated in favour of her nephew, Emperor Go-Momozono. She taught and looked after him, telling him after the birth of his daughter (which led to much worry over if he'd have a son) "You're still young, so I'm sure you'll be blessed with a prince in due course", but he died at age 22, leaving behind his new born daughter. Thus, the Emperor's death was kept a secret, as Go-Sakuramachi adopted Prince Morohito, making him heir. He was of the Kan'in-no-miya branch of the imperial family and would become Emperor Kōkaku.

In order to ensure the connection and unity of the two branches, she married Kōkaku to her grandniece, and only child of her nephew, Princess Yoshiko.

She worried over the new emperor greatly, who was nine years old, and wrote to the former regent of Japan that she still relied on him and needed his help. She also wrote to the new emperor: "May the winds of this land, beloved by the people, blow gently in this first spring of your reign".

While she moved to the Sentō Imperial Palace in Kyoto, she was known to often visit the new emperor.

The new emperor, now in his 20s, wanted to elevate the status of his father. This caused outrage with the court nobles, and the former empress advised: "Rather than seeking higher titles or status, ensuring that your reign lasts for a long time is the greatest act of filial piety you can show your father", to which the emperor took her advice.

During the Great Tenmei famine, thousands flocked to the imperial palace, offering prayers and money hoping for good fortune. While it started small, it grew into tens of thousands of people per day, and people began throwing coins at the palace gate, praying, and holding festivities. This became known as Gosho Sendo Mairi, and the former empress began handing out apples to pilgrims, ordering that rice and water be brought out to them as well which increased her popularity.

This, along with her teachings to Emperor Kōkaku in which she taught him compassion and benevolence to the people, earned her the nickname "Mother of the Nation" or "National Mother".

== Death ==
Empress Go-Sakuramachi died on 24 December 1813, aged 73, 11 months after the death of her adopted son's biological mother, Ōe Iwashiro.

== Eras and Kugyō ==
The years of Go-Sakuramachi's reign are more specifically identified by more than one era name or nengō. While Kugyō (公卿), is a collective term for the very few most powerful men attached to the court of the Emperor of Japan in pre-Meiji eras. Even during those years in which the court's actual influence outside the palace walls was minimal, the hierarchic organization persisted. In general, this elite group included only three to four men at a time. These were hereditary courtiers whose experience and background would have brought them to the pinnacle of a life's career.

The following eras occurred during Go-Sakuramachi's reign:

- Hōreki (1751–1764)
- Meiwa (1764–1772)

During Go-Sakuramachi's reign, this apex of the Daijō-kan included:

- Sadaijin
- Udaijin
- Naidaijin
- Dainagon

== Ancestry ==
Ancestors of Empress Go-Sakuramachi

8. Emperor Higashiyama (1675-1710)
4. Emperor Nakamikado (1702-1737)
9. Kushige Yoshiko (1675-1710)
2. Emperor Sakuramachi (1720-1750)
10. Konoe Iehiro (1667-1736)
5. Konoe Hisako (1702-1720)
11. Machijiri Ryōko
1. Empress Go-Sakuramachi
12. Nijō Tsunahira (1672-1732)
6. Nijō Yoshitada (1689-1737)
13. Princess Masako (1673-1746)
3. Nijō Ieko (1716-1790)
14. Maeda Tsunanori, 4th Lord of Kaga (1643-1724)
7. Maeda Toshiko (1693-1749)
15. Tsuda Hojuin

== See also ==
- Empress of Japan
- Emperor of Japan
  - List of emperors of Japan
- Japanese imperial succession debate
- Imperial cult
- Imperial Crown of Empress Go-Sakuramachi

== Citations ==
- Brinkley, Frank. (1907). A History of the Japanese People from the Earliest Times to the End of the Meiji Era. New York: Encyclopædia Britannica. OCLC 413099
- Hall, John Whitney. (1988). The Cambridge History of Japan, Vol. 4. Early Modern Japan. Cambridge: Cambridge University Press. ISBN 978-0-521-22355-3; OCLC 489633115
- Meyer, Eva-Maria. (1999). Japans Kaiserhof in der Edo-Zeit: unter besonderer Berücksichtigung der Jahre 1846 bis 1867. Münster: LIT Verlag. ISBN 978-3-8258-3939-0; OCLC 42041594
- Ponsonby-Fane, Richard. (1956). Kyoto: The Old Capital of Japan, 794–1869. Kyoto: Ponsonby Memorial Society. OCLC 182637732
- __________. (1959). The Imperial House of Japan. Kyoto: Ponsonby Memorial Society. OCLC 194887
- Screech, Timon. (2006). Secret Memoirs of the Shoguns: Isaac Titsingh and Japan, 1779–1822. London: RoutledgeCurzon. ISBN 978-0-203-09985-8; OCLC 65177072
- Titsingh, Isaac. (1834). Annales des empereurs du Japon (Nihon Ōdai Ichiran). Paris: Royal Asiatic Society, Oriental Translation Fund of Great Britain and Ireland. OCLC 5850691

Regnal titles
Preceded by Emperor Momozono	Empress of Japan: Go-Sakuramachi; 1762–1771	Succeeded by Emperor Go-Momozono
