= Nishikawa Joken =

Japanese geographer and astronomer

Nishikawa Joken (西川 如見, 1648 – November 9, 1724) was an Edo period Japanese geographer and astronomer, and author of the encyclopaedic text Ka'i tsūshō kō (Thoughts on trade and communication with the civilised and the barbaric). He played a role in popularizing early modern European astronomy in Japan through works such as Tenmon Giron (A Discussion of Astronomy).

== Contributions to Neo-Confucian philosophy ==
Nishikawa's writings on astronomy are notable for reworking Neo-Confucian philosophical ideas in light of the success of Western science; his idea of science separated metaphysical and ethical ideas from empirical observation, whereas Confucianism traditionally saw moral cultivation and empirical study as linked. This new conception of Confucianism became non-empirical but also allowed Japanese cultural and political ideas to accommodate European science.

Nishikawa's philosophical ideas may have influenced Tokugawa Yoshimune through a series of lectures on astronomy that Nishikawa delivered before the Shōgun in 1720. After the lectures, Yoshimune relaxed the rules on the importation of European books, which had previously been highly restricted by the Sakoku policy.
