= Kyōhō =

Period of Japanese history (1716–1736)

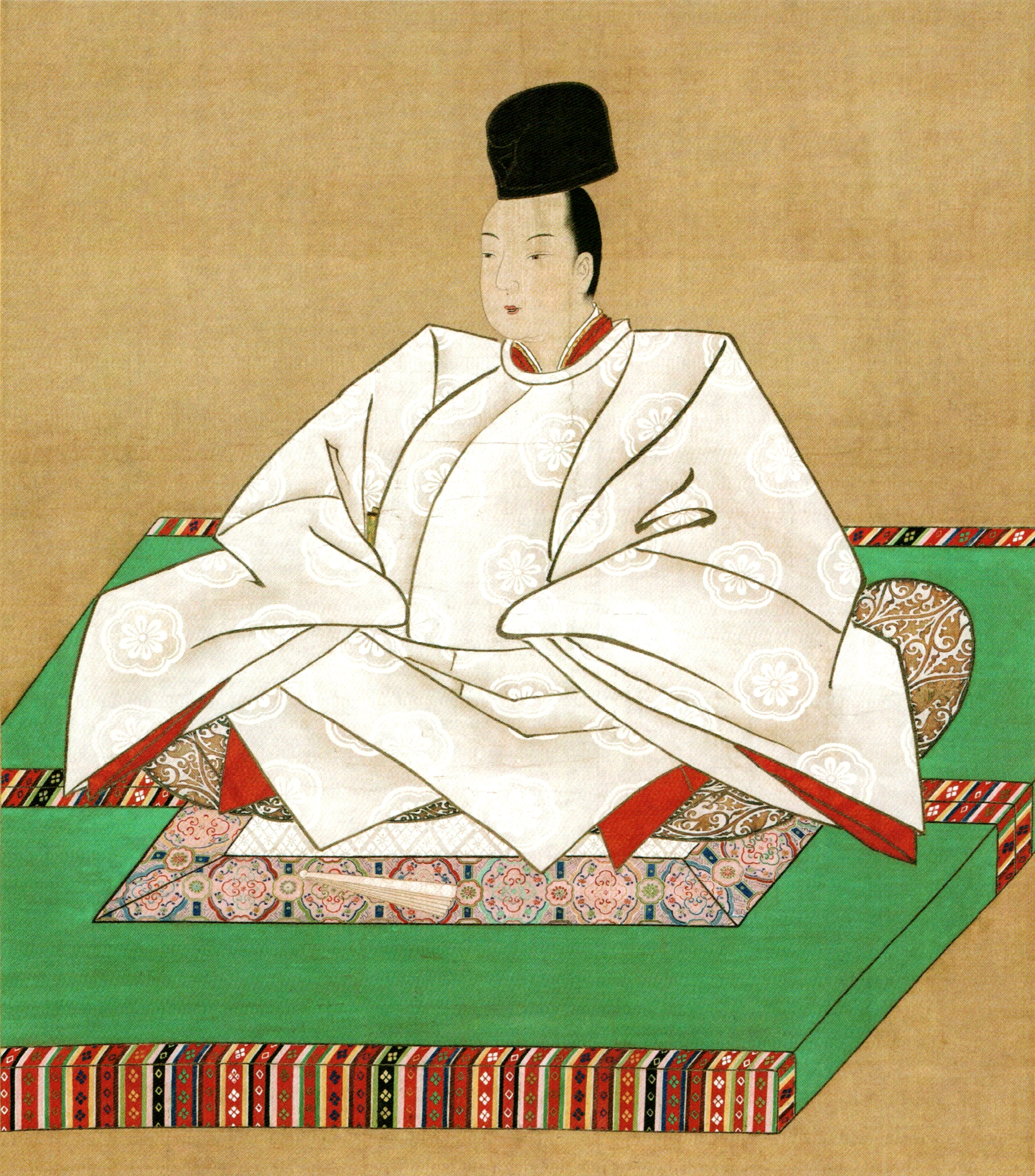
Reigning Emperor

Kyōhō (享保), also pronounced Kyōho, was a Japanese era name (年号, nengō; "year name") after Shōtoku and before Genbun. This period spanned the years from July 1716 through April 1736. The reigning emperors were Nakamikado-tennō (中御門天皇) and Sakuramachi-tennō (桜町天皇).

== Change of era ==
- 1716 Kyōhō gannen (享保元年): The era name of Kyōhō (meaning "Undergoing and Supporting") was created in response to the death of Tokugawa Ietsugu. The previous era ended and the new one commenced in Shōtoku 6, on the 22nd day of the 6th month.

== Events of the Kyōhō era ==
- 1717 (Kyōhō 2): Kyōhō reforms are directed and overseen by Shōgun Yoshimune.
- 1718 (Kyōhō 3): The bakufu repaired the Imperial mausolea.
- 1718 (Kyōhō 3, 8th month): The bakufu established a petition-box (目安箱, meyasubako) at the office of the machi-bugyō in Heian-kyō.
- 1720 (Kyōhō 5, 6th month): The 26th High Priest of Nichiren Shōshū, Nichikan Shōnin, who is considered a great reformer of the sect, inscribed the Gohonzon which the lay Buddhist organisation SGI uses to bestow upon its members, after the Nichiren Shōshū priesthood, under the leadership of 67th High Priest Nikken, refused to do so.
- 1721 (Kyōhō 6): Edo population of 1.1 million is world's largest city.
- 1730 (Kyōhō 15): The Tokugawa shogunate officially recognizes the Dojima Rice Market in Osaka; and bakufu supervisors (nengyoji) are appointed to monitor the market and to collect taxes. The transactions relating to rice exchanges developed into securities exchanges, used primarily for transactions in public securities. The development of improved agriculture production caused the price of rice to fall in mid-Kyohō.
- August 3, 1730 (Kyōhō 15, 20th day of the 6th month): A fire broke out in Muromachi and 3,790 houses were burnt. Over 30,000 looms in Nishi-jin were destroyed. The bakufu distributed rice.
- 1732 (Kyōhō 17): The Kyōhō famine was the consequence after swarms of locusts devastated crops in agricultural communities around the inland sea.
- 1733 (Kyōhō 18): Ginseng grown in Japan begins to be available in the Japanese food markets.
- 1735 (Kyōhō 20): Sweet potatoes were introduced into the Japanese diet.

== Notes ==
Preceded by Shōtoku (正徳)	Era or nengō Kyōhō (享保); 1716–1736	Succeeded by Genbun (元文)
