= Tokugawa Shigeyoshi =

Tokugawa Shigeyoshi (徳川 重好, March 17, 1745 – August 22, 1795) was a Japanese samurai of the mid-Edo period who was the founder of the Shimizu-Tokugawa family, one of the Gosankyō, the three lesser branches of the Tokugawa family. He was the second son of Tokugawa Ieshige, the ninth shōgun. His child-hood name was Manjiro (萬二郎). He married daughter of Prince Fushimi no Miya Sadatake.

== Family ==
- Father: Tokugawa Ieshige
- Mother: Oitsu no Kata (1721-1789) later Anshoin
- Wife: Fushimi no Miya Sadako

Preceded by none	Shimizu-Tokugawa family head 1758-1795	Succeeded by Tokugawa Atsunosuke
