= Genbun =

Period of Japanese history (1736–1741)

Genbun (元文) was a Japanese era name (年号, nengō, "year name") after Kyōhō and before Kanpō. This period spanned the years from April 1736 through February 1741. The reigning emperor was Sakuramachi-tennō (桜町天皇).

== Change of era ==
- 1736 Genbun gannen (元文元年): To mark the enthronement of Sakuramachi, the era was changed to Genbun (meaning "Original civility"). The previous era ended and the new one commenced in Kyōhō 21, on the 21st day of the 4th month.

== Events of the Genbun era ==
- 1736 (Genbun 1): The shogunate published an edict declaring that henceforth, the sole, authorized coinage in the empire would be those copper coins which were marked on the obverse with the character 文 (pronounced bun in Japanese or pronounced wen in Chinese—which is to say, the same character which is found in this era name of Genbun).
- 1737 (Genbun 2, 11th month): A comet is noticed in the western part of the sky.
- 1738 (Genbun 3): Esoteric Shinto rituals Daijō-ye (大嘗會 (ダイジヤウヱ), Daijō-sai) were performed by the emperor.
- 1739 (Genbun 4): Some foundrymen in Edo are commanded to create iron coins for use across the empire.
- 1739 (Genbun 4): Hosokawa Etchū-no-kami of Higo was killed in Edo castle by Itakura Katsukane, and the killer was ordered to commit suicide as just punishment; however, Shōgun Yoshimune personally intervened to mitigate the adverse consequences for the killer's fudai family.
- August 8, 1740 (Genbun 5, 16th day of the 7th month): Great floods in Heian-kyō. Sanjo Bridge is washed away.
- January 11, 1741 (Genbun 5, 24th day of the 11th month): The esoteric Niiname-matsuri ceremonies were performed. This specific ceremony had otherwise been held in abeyance for the previous 280 years.

== Notes ==
Preceded by Kyōhō (享保)	Era or nengō Genbun (元文); 1736–1741	Succeeded by Kanpō (寛保)
