= Convention of Saint Petersburg (1747) =

1747 treaty between Great Britain, Russia, and the Dutch Republic

The Convention of Saint Petersburg was a military pact concluded between Great Britain, Russia and the Dutch Republic in 1747. It confirmed an alliance between the three during the War of the Austrian Succession, directed against France and Prussia. It was signed in Saint Petersburg on 15 August 1747.

== Bibliography ==
- Baker-Smith Royal Discord: The Family of George III. Athena Press, 2008.
- Browning, Reed. The Duke of Newcastle. Yale University Press, 1975.
- Murphy, Orvile T. Charles Gravier: Comete de Vergennes: French Diplomacy in the Age of Revolution. New York Press, 1982.
- Simms, Brendan. Three Victories and a Defeat: The Rise and Fall of the First British Empire. Penguin Books, 2008.
