= Emperor Go-Momozono =

Emperor of Japan from 1771 to 1779

Emperor Go-Momozono 後桃園天皇
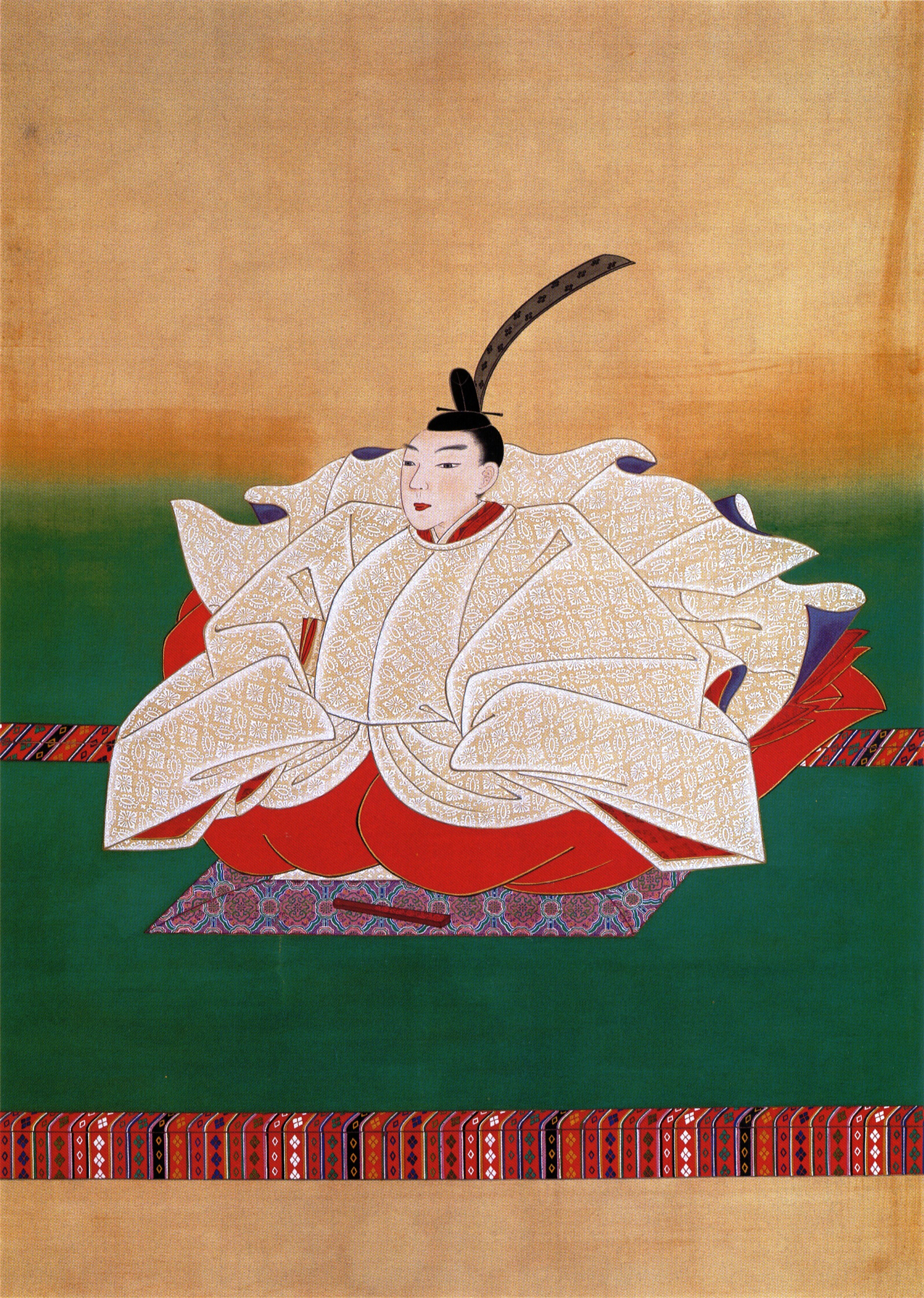

Emperor of Japan
- Reign: 9 January 1771 – 16 December 1779
- Predecessor: Go-Sakuramachi
- Successor: Kōkaku
- Shōgun: Tokugawa Ieharu (1771-1779)
- Born: Hidehito (英仁); 5 August 1758; Heian-Kyo, Kyoto, Tokugawa shogunate
- Died: 16 December 1779 (aged 21); Kyoto, Tokugawa shogunate
- Burial: Tsuki no wa no misasagi, Kyoto
- Spouse: Konoe Koreko
- Issue: Princess Yoshiko
Posthumous name
- Tsuigō: Emperor Go-Momozono (後桃園院 or 後桃園天皇)
- House: Imperial House of Japan
- Father: Emperor Momozono
- Mother: Ichijō Tomiko
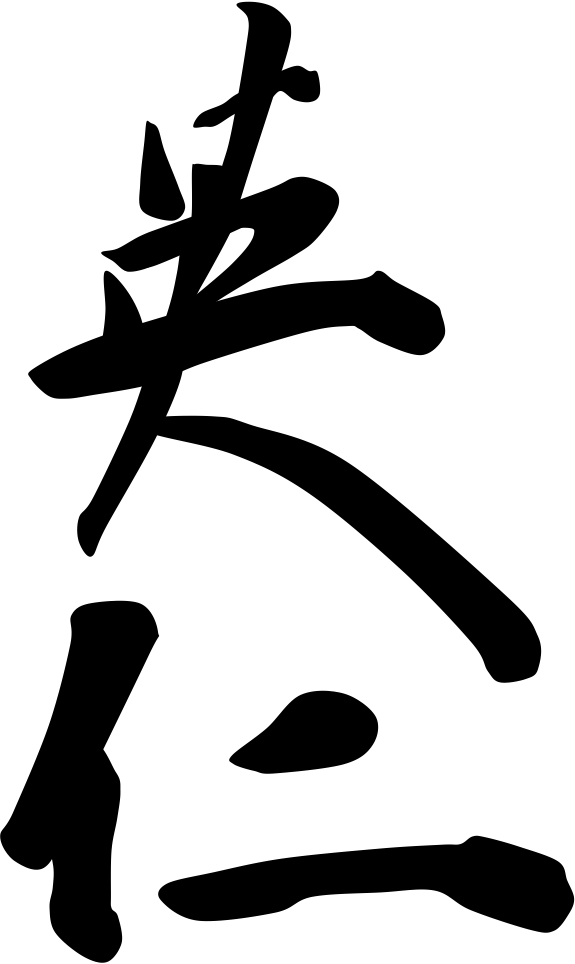
- Signature

Emperor Go-Momozono (Japanese: 後桃園天皇, Hepburn: Go-Momozono-tennō; 5 August 1758 – 16 December 1779), personal name Hidehito, was the 118th emperor of Japan, according to the traditional order of succession. He was named after his father Emperor Momozono. The wording of go- (後) in the name translates as "later", so he has also been referred to as "Later Emperor Momozono", "Momozono, the second", or "Momozono II".

Go-Momozono became Emperor in 1771, during the Edo period, and died eight years into his reign in 1779. Events during his reign were confined to a series of natural calamities that occurred in 1772, aside from that the political situation with the Shōgun was quiet. Things came to a head towards the end of Go-Momozono's life in the form of a succession issue as the Emperor had no eligible successor. As a result, he hastily adopted a son on his deathbed who later became the next Emperor.

== Genealogy ==
He was the son of Emperor Momozono with a lady-in-waiting. Before becoming emperor, he was known as Imperial Prince Hidehito (英仁親王).

Consort and issue(s):

- Empress (Nyogo): Konoe Koreko (近衛 維子, 26 January 1760 – 6 November 1783), later Seikamō-in (盛化門院), daughter of Konoe Uchisaki (近衛内前)
  - First Daughter: Imperial Princess Yoshiko (欣子内親王, 11 March 1779 – 11 August 1846), married to Emperor Kōkaku
- Adopted children:
  - Adopted Son: Imperial Prince Kanehito(兼仁親王, 23 September 1771 – 11 December 1840), later Emperor Kōkaku

== Events of Go-Momozono's life ==
=== Early life ===
Before Go-Momozono's accession to the Chrysanthemum Throne, his personal name (imina) was Hidehito (英仁) or Hanahito. Prince Hidehito was born on August 5, 1758, and was the firstborn son of Emperor Momozono. After his father died in 1762, the title of Emperor went to his aunt who became known as Empress Go-Sakuramachi. Hidehito was deemed too young to become Emperor at the time but was named Crown Prince and heir 5 years later. Empress Go-Sakuramachi abdicated in favor of her nephew on January 9, 1771, and Prince Hidehito became Emperor immediately.

=== As Emperor ===
Little more than a year had passed into Go-Momozono's reign before Japan was hit with "The Great Meiwa Fire". On February 29, 1772, unofficial reports described a swath of ashes and cinders nearly five miles wide and 15 miles (24 km) long—destroying 178 temples and shrines, 127 daimyō residences, 878 non-official residences, 8705 houses of hatamoto, and 628 blocks of merchant dwellings, with estimates of over 6,000 casualties. All this devastation subsequently engendered the costs of reconstruction. The year 1772 as a whole was later called "year of trouble" because it was marked by an extraordinary succession of natural calamities. A contemporary pun was made linking the words "Meiwa" + "ku" (meaning "Meiwa 9", that is, the year 1772 according to the era calendar) and the sound-alike word "meiwaku" (meaning "misfortune" or "annoyance"). In addition to the fire, a tempest struck the Kantō region, causing floods and ruining crops. Another storm brought flooding and high winds to the Kantō region, destroying an estimated 4000 houses in Edo alone. The era name (nengō) was changed at the end of the year to Anei (meaning "eternal tranquillity"); but this symbolic act proved to be futile. Epidemic diseases spread across the country in 1775 which resulted in 190,000 estimated deaths in Edo.

=== Succession issue and death ===
Go-Momozono's Imperial Family lived with him in the Dairi of the Heian Palace, he never officially married and only had children with a court lady named Konoe Koreko (近衛維子). This family included at least 2 sons who died in infancy, and one 10-month-old daughter at the time of the Emperor's early death. Emperor Go-Momozono became ill in 1779, but his daughter was not eligible to become empress due to her age. When it became clear that the Emperor would not survive, his aunt former Empress Go-Sakuramachi had him adopt a son on his deathbed. The adopted son was from the Kan'in branch of the Imperial family, and would become the next Emperor. Go-Momozono died on December 16, 1779, at the age of 21 and his adopted son Prince Morohito became Emperor Kōkaku in the following year. Go-Momozono's only daughter Princess Yoshiko would later become Kōkaku's chief wife (chūgū).

Go-Momozono's kami is enshrined in the Imperial mausoleum, Tsuki no wa no misasagi, at Sennyū-ji in Higashiyama-ku, Kyoto. Also enshrined in this location are this Emperor's immediate Imperial predecessors since Emperor Go-Mizunoo – Meishō, Go-Kōmyō, Go-Sai, Reigen, Higashiyama, Nakamikado, Sakuramachi, Momozono and Go-Sakuramachi. The shrine complex also encompasses the misasagi of three of Go-Momozono's immediate successors – Kōkaku, Ninkō, and Kōmei.

== Eras and Kugyō ==
The years of Go-Momozono's reign are more specifically identified by more than one era name or nengō: While Kugyō (公卿) is a collective term for the very few most powerful men attached to the court of the Emperor of Japan in pre-Meiji eras. Even during those years in which the court's actual influence outside the palace walls was minimal, the hierarchic organization persisted. In general, this elite group included only three to four men at a time. These were hereditary courtiers whose experience and background would have brought them to the pinnacle of a life's career. During Go-Momozono's reign, this apex of the Daijō-kan included: Sadaijin, Udaijin, Naidaijin, and Dainagon.

The following eras occurred during Go-Momozono's reign:

- Meiwa (1764–1772)
- An'ei (1772–1781)

== Ancestry ==
Ancestry of Emperor Go-Momozono

8. Emperor Nakamikado (1702-1737)
4. Emperor Sakuramachi (1720-1750)
9. Konoe Hisako (1702-1720)
2. Emperor Momozono (1747-1762)
10. Anegakōji Mitake (1696-1726)
5. Anegakōji Sadako (1717-1789)
1. Emperor Go-Momozono
12. Takatsukasa Fusasuke (1637-1700)
6. Ichijō Kaneka (1692-1751)
3. Ichijō Tomiko (1743-1796)

== See also ==
- Emperor of Japan
- List of Emperors of Japan
- Imperial cult
- Modern system of ranked Shinto shrines

== Notes ==
Japanese Imperial kamon — a stylized chrysanthemum blossom

Regnal titles
Preceded by Empress Go-Sakuramachi	Emperor of Japan: Go-Momozono; 1771–1779	Succeeded by Emperor Kōkaku
