= Emperor Sakuramachi =

Emperor of Japan from 1735 to 1747

Emperor Sakuramachi 桜町天皇
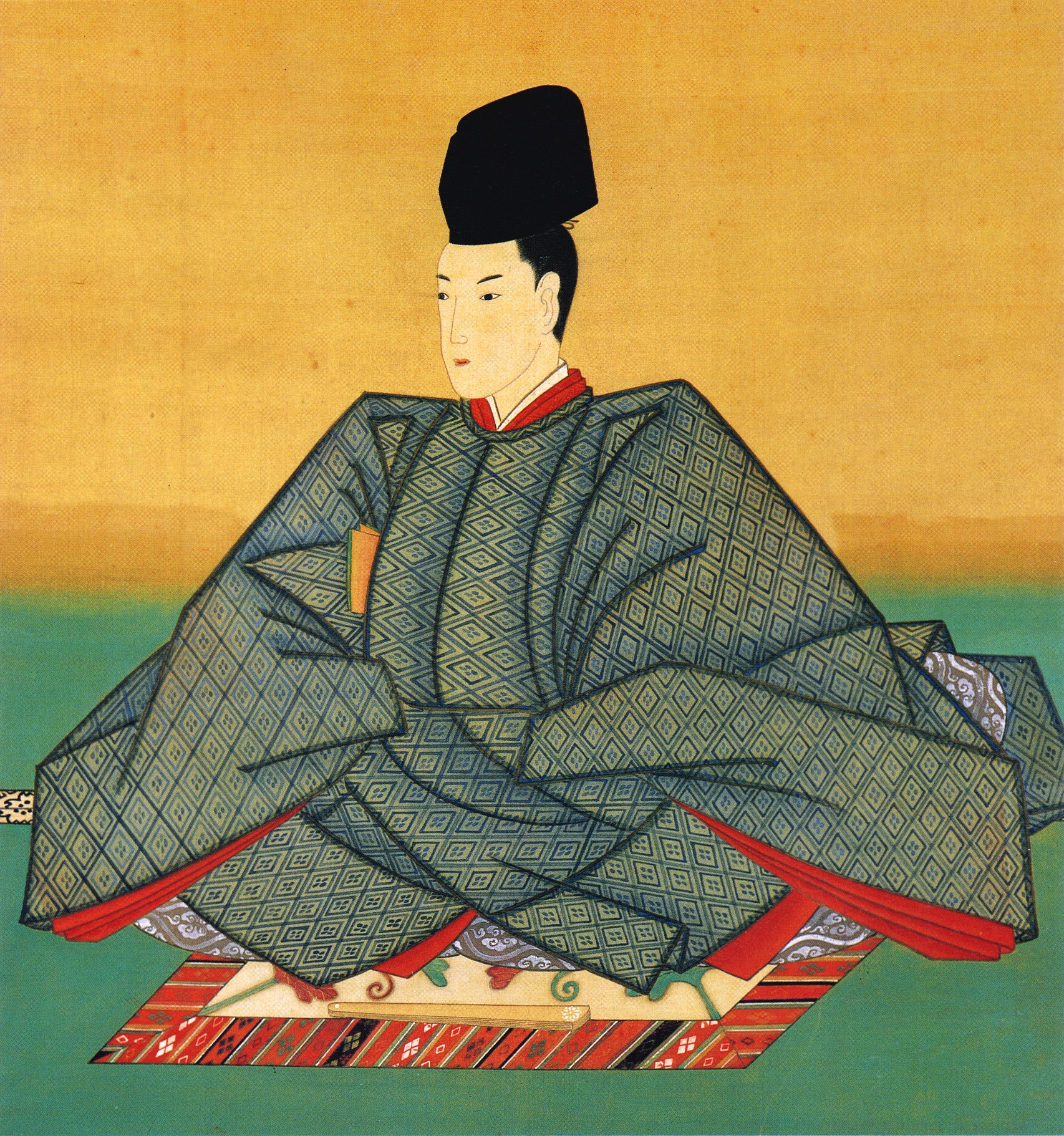
- Portrait by Kazahaya Shōshō, mid-18th century

Emperor of Japan
- Reign: 13 April 1735 – 9 June 1747
- Predecessor: Nakamikado
- Successor: Momozono
- Shōguns: See list: Tokugawa Yoshimune (1735-1745) Tokugawa Ieshige (1745-1747)
- Born: Teruhito (昭仁); 8 February 1720; Kyoto, Tokugawa shogunate
- Died: 28 May 1750 (aged 30); Kyoto, Tokugawa shogunate
- Burial: Tsuki no wa no misasagi, Kyoto
- Spouse: Nijō Ieko
- Issue: Princess Sakariko; Empress Go-Sakuramachi; Emperor Momozono
Posthumous name
- Tsuigō: Emperor Sakuramachi (桜町院 or 桜町天皇)
- House: Imperial House of Japan
- Father: Emperor Nakamikado
- Mother: Konoe Hisako

Emperor Sakuramachi (Japanese: 桜町天皇, Hepburn: Sakuramachi-tennō; 8 February 1720 – 28 May 1750), personal name Teruhito, was the 115th emperor of Japan, according to the traditional order of succession. He was enthroned as Emperor in 1735, a reign that would last until 1747 with his abdication. As with previous Emperors during the Edo period, the Tokugawa shogunate had control over Japan.

The Emperor's role was a religious figure who performed limited duties. This changed when Sakuramachi was granted permission from the Shōgun to restore some Imperial rites. Ceremonies such as the Harvest Festival that had previously been absent for over 250 years were now allowed. Sakuramachi had one wife and a concubine with whom he fathered 4 children. His first son would go on to become Emperor Momozono, while his second daughter would later be Empress Go-Sakuramachi. Sakuramachi died on 28 May 1750, which was almost three years after his abdication.

== Events of Sakuramachi's life ==
=== Early life ===
Before Sakuramachi's ascension to the Chrysanthemum Throne, his personal name (imina) was Teruhito (昭仁). Teruhito was born on 8 February 1720 and was the firstborn son of Emperor Nakamikado, he was also said to be the reincarnation of Prince Shōtoku. Teruhito's Imperial family lived with him in the Dairi of the Heian Palace. Events during Teruhito's early life included Edo becoming the world's largest city in 1721, with a population of 1.1 million people. On 17 July 1728, Teruhito was named crown prince and held the pre-accession title of Waka-no-miya (若宮). The only other major event to occur afterwards was a disaster in 1732–33 called the Kyōhō famine. This event was caused by swarms of locusts that devastated crops in agricultural communities around the inland sea.

=== Reign ===
Prince Teruhito acceded to the throne on 13 April 1735 as Emperor when his father abdicated in his favor, the era's name was changed from Kyōhō to Genbun to mark this event. While he held the political title of Emperor, it was in name only as the shoguns of the Tokugawa family controlled Japan. With the support of Tokugawa Yoshimune though, Sakuramachi worked for the restoration of some Imperial rites. Two of the first reinstated ceremonies were brought back in the form of rice offerings. Daijōsai (大嘗祭) is a rice-offering by a newly enthroned Emperor, while Shinjōsai (新嘗祭) is a rice-offering by the Emperor. In 1738, the Emperor performed Esoteric Shinto rituals known as Daijō-e (大嘗會). A major event occurred on 11 January 1741 where a ceremony was performed to mark Niiname-no-Matsuri (Harvest Festival). This specific ceremony had otherwise been held in abeyance for the previous 280 years. The Toyonoakari-no-sechiye ceremonies were also performed the following day.

The era's name was changed to Kanpō in February 1741 due to the belief in Chinese astrology that the 58th year of the sexagenary cycle brings changes. The provinces of Musashi, Kōzuke, Shimotsuke, and Shinano all had noteworthy devastation from a major flood that occurred in 1742. In Heian-kyō, the Sanjo Bridge was also washed away in this destructive storm cycle. During the close of the Kanpō era, a comet was seen and recorded in the Nihon Ōdai Ichiran, a consensus by later researches state that the comet was likely C/1743 X1 (De Cheseaux). The fourth and final era during Sakuramachi's reign began in 1744, and was called Enkyō (meaning "Becoming Prolonged"). This new era was created to mark the start of a new 60-year cycle of the Chinese zodiac. The last two major events during Sakuramachi's reign occurred in 1745, when Tokugawa Ieshige became the new shogun. The first establishment of a market fair in the capital was to be found at Hirano Shrine in Ōmi Province, while in Edo a great fire swept through the city.

=== Daijō Tennō ===
Emperor Sakuramachi abdicated on 9 June 1747 in favor of his son Prince Toohito, who became Emperor Momozono. Sakuramachi took on the title of Daijō Tennō (Retired Emperor), and the era's name was changed to Kan'en (meaning "Prolonging Lenience") to mark the occasion. Events that took place during his time as a Jōkō include a powerful storm that struck Kyoto on 7 October 1749. The damage done included the burning of the keep of Nijō Castle after it was struck by lightning. Sakuramachi died on 28 May 1750 which was almost three years after his abdication. Sakuramachi's kami is enshrined in an Imperial mausoleum (misasagi), Tsuki no wa no misasagi, at Sennyū-ji in Higashiyama-ku, Kyoto. Sakuramachi's immediate Imperial predecessors since Emperor Go-Mizunoo – Meishō, Go-Kōmyō, Go-Sai, Reigen, Higashiyama and Nakamikado, are also enshrined along with his immediate Imperial successors, including Momozono, Go-Sakuramachi and Go-Momozono.

=== Other events ===
While the Emperor had no say, a major milestone occurred in Japanese monetary history when the shogunate published an edict in 1736 regarding coinage. This edict declared that henceforth, authorized coinage in the empire would be those copper coins which were marked on the obverse with the character 文 (Genbun, also pronounced bun in Japanese). The practice of placing the name of the era on coinage continues to present day with Naruhito (徳仁).

== Eras and Kugyō ==
The years of Sakuramachi's reign are more specifically identified by more than one era name or nengō. While Kugyō (公卿) is a collective term for the very few most powerful men attached to the court of the Emperor of Japan in pre-Meiji eras. Even during those years in which the court's actual influence outside the palace walls was minimal, the hierarchic organization persisted. In general, this elite group included only three to four men at a time. These were hereditary courtiers whose experience and background would have brought them to the pinnacle of a life's career.

The following eras occurred during Sakuramachi's reign:

- Kyōhō (1716–1736)
- Gembun (1736–1741)
- Kanpō (1741–1744)
- Enkyō (1744–1748)

During Sakuramachi's reign, this apex of the Daijō-kan included:

- Sadaijin
- Udaijin
- Naidaijin
- Dainagon

== Genealogy ==
Emperor Sakuramachi's family included at least 3 children who were born to 2 consorts:

=== Spouse ===
| Position | Name | Birth | Death | Father | Issue |
|---|---|---|---|---|---|
| Chūgū | Nijō Ieko (二条舎子) | 1716 | 1790 | Nijō Yoshitada | • First daughter: Imperial Princess Noriko • Second daughter: Imperial Princess Toshiko (later Empress Go-Sakuramachi) |

=== Concubine ===
| Name | Birth | Death | Father | Issue |
|---|---|---|---|---|
| Anegakōji Sadako (姉小路定子) | 1717 | 1789 | Anegakōji Sanetake | • First son: Imperial Prince Toohito (later Emperor Momozono) |

=== Issue ===
Emperor Sakuramachi fathered a total of 3 children with a wife and a concubine.

| Status | Name | Birth | Death | Mother | Marriage | Issue |
|---|---|---|---|---|---|---|
| First daughter | Imperial Princess Noriko (盛子内親王) | 1737 | 1746 | Nijō Ieko | —N/a | —N/a |
| Second daughter | Imperial Princess Toshiko (智子内親王) (later Empress Go-Sakuramachi) | 1740 | 1813 | Nijō Ieko | —N/a | —N/a |
| First son | Imperial Prince Toohito (遐仁親王) (later Emperor Momozono) | 1741 | 1762 | Anegakōji Sadako | Ichijō Tomiko | • Imperial Prince Hidehito (later Emperor Go-Momozono) • Imperial Prince Fushimi-no-miya Sadamochi |

== Ancestry ==
Ancestors of Emperor Sakuramachi

8. Emperor Reigen (1654–1732)
4. Emperor Higashiyama (1675–1710)
9. Matsuki Muneko (1658–1732)
2. Emperor Nakamikado (1702–1737)
10. Kushige Takayoshi (1652–1733)
5. Kushige Yoshiko (1675–1710)
11. Nishinotōin
1. Emperor Sakuramachi
12. Konoe Motohiro (1648–1722)
6. Konoe Iehiro (1667–1736)
13. Princess Tsuneko (1642–1702)
3. Konoe Hisako (1702–1720)
14. Machijiri Kanekazu (1662–1742)
7. Machijiri Ryōko

== Notes ==
Japanese Imperial kamon — a stylized chrysanthemum blossom

== See also ==
- Emperor of Japan
- List of Emperors of Japan
- Imperial cult
- Empress Go-Sakuramachi

Regnal titles
| Preceded by Emperor Nakamikado | Emperor of Japan: Sakuramachi; 1735–1747 | Succeeded by Emperor Momozono |
