= An'ei =

Period of Japanese history (1772–1781)

An'ei (安永) was a Japanese era name (年号, nengō; "year name") after Meiwa and before Tenmei. This period spanned the years November 1772 through March 1781. The reigning emperors were Go-Momozono-tennō (後桃園天皇) and Kōkaku-tennō (光格天皇).

== Change of era ==
- 1772 An'ei gannen (安永元年): The era name was changed to An'ei (meaning "peaceful eternity") to mark the enthronement of Emperor Go-Momozono and in hopes of turning attention from the serial catastrophic devastation from fires and storms in Meiwa 9. The previous era ended and a new one commenced in the 11th month of Meiwa 9.

== Events of the An'ei era ==
- 1775 (An'ei 4): Epidemic diseases spread across the country – in Edo alone, an estimated 190,000 perished.
- 1775 (An'ei 4): Swedish physician and botanist Carl Peter Thunberg arrives at VOC outpost or "factory" in Nagasaki bay; and ultimately, his scientific activities will result in the first detailed, descriptive survey of the flora and fauna of the Japanese archipelago.
- 1778 (An'ei 7): Kyoto suffers a massive flood.
- 1778 (An'ei 7): Volcanic island of Sakurajima erupts one mile away from Kagoshima – 16,000 dead.
- 1779 (An'ei 8): Dutch surgeon and cultural-anthropologist Isaac Titsingh arrives at Dejima for the first of three terms as Opperhoofd or captain of the VOC station; and ultimately, his seminal research will become a noteworthy step in that process in which the Japanese begin to describe and characterize themselves in their own terms. Titsingh's correspondence with William Marsden, a philologist colleague in the Royal Society in London, provides some insight into his personal appreciation of the task at hand. In an 1809 letter, he explains:

To form a proper idea of the spirit, the character, and the customs of a Nation, almost unknown in Europe, I deemed it preferable to represent them in their own dress, rather than to enter myself into particular details, always infected by the manner of considering the facts, notwithstanding the utmost endeavors to be guided by truth in the most essential parts. [T]o obtain this end, I applied during my stay in Japan to some friends, reputed as men of learning, and free from all national prejudices. [T]hey procured me such works on various topicks, as enjoy'd with them the highest regard. [H]aving succeeding in this, a literal translation appeared to me more congenial with the purpose, and likely to be more satisfactory to the desire for more distinct notions on a people almost unknown, though fully deserving the attention, since a number of years so profusely lavished on the Chinese.

— Isaac Titsingh

Bakufu policy in this era was designed to marginalize the influence of foreigners in An'ei Japan; however, an unintended and opposite consequence of sakoku was to enhance the value and significance of a very small number of thoughtful observers like Thunberg and Titsingh, whose writings document what each scholar learned or discovered first-hand. Thunberg's and Titsingh's published accounts and their unpublished writings provided a unique and useful perspective for Orientalists and Japanologists in the 19th century; and the work of both men continues to be rigorously examined by modern researchers today.

- 1780 (An'ei 9): Heavy rains and floods in the Kantō necessitate extensive government relief in the flood-stricken areas.

== See also ==
- Bunsei – Philipp Franz von Siebold
- Genroku – Engelbert Kaempfer

Preceded by Meiwa (明和)	Era or nengō An'ei (安永); 1772–1781	Succeeded by Tenmei (天明)
