= Tokugawa Munetake =

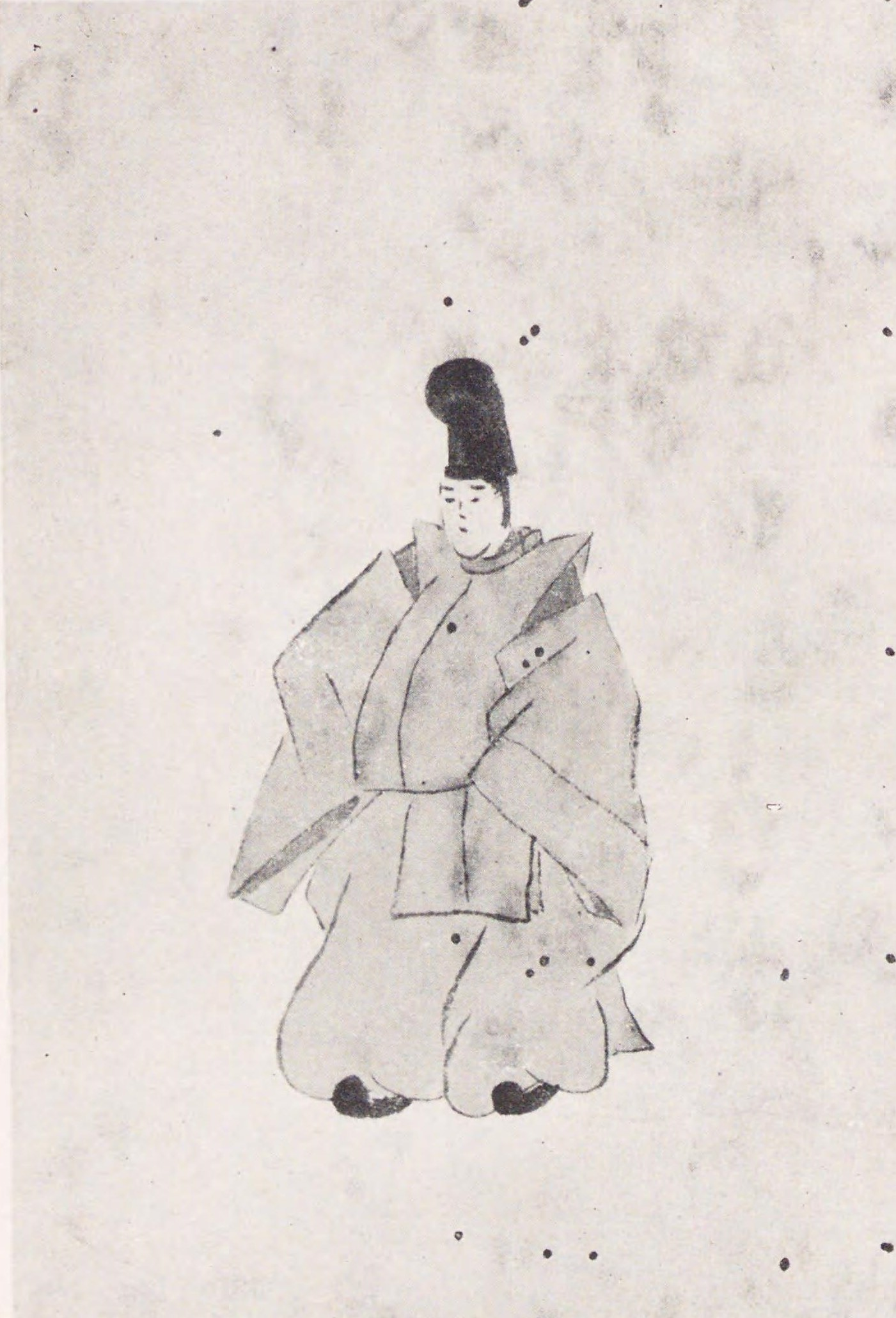
Tokugawa Munetake

Tokugawa Munetake (徳川 宗武; January 21, 1716 – July 15, 1771) was a Japanese samurai of the mid-Edo period, also known as Tayasu Munetake (田安 宗武). The first head of the Tayasu branch of the Tokugawa clan, he held daimyō-level income, but was not a daimyō himself, instead having his residence inside the Tayasu gate (Tayasu-mon 田安門) of Edo Castle. His child-hood name was Kojiro (小次郎). When his mother Okon died in 1722, he was raised by Okume no Kata, one of Yoshimune's concubines.

== Biography ==
He was the second son of the eighth shōgun Tokugawa Yoshimune with his concubine, Okon no Kata. Munetake was considered by some as the logical choice for heir, as he was both physically fit and also well-educated. However, Yoshimune preferred the route of primogeniture, instead selecting his son Ieshige as heir. Munetake subsequently turned his attention to writing and scholarship, and set the Tayasu house apart from the other two gosankyō houses by keeping it spartan. He had several sons who were brought up in this spartan environment, one of whom was the famed reformer Matsudaira Sadanobu. His wife was Morihime, daughter of Konoe Iehisa.

As a scholar, Munetake was a student of kokugaku. He studied under Kada no Arimaro and Kamo no Mabuchi, eventually producing the kokugaku texts Kokka hachiron yogen (国歌八論余言) and Tenkō-gon (天降言). He was also an accomplished poet.

As head of the prestigious Tayasu-Tokugawa house, Munetake held the court title of gon-chūnagon (権中納言) and the junior 3rd court rank (jusanmi 従三).

== Family ==
- Father: Tokugawa Yoshimune
- Mother: Okon no Kata (d.1723) later Hontokuin
- Adopted Mother: Okume no Kata later Kakuju-in (1697-1777)
- Wife, concubine, children:
  - Wife: Konoe Moriko (1721-1786) later Horen-in
    - Keijiro (1745-1753)
    - Tokugawa Haruaki
    - Makotohime (1741-1759) Date Shigemura's fiancée
    - Yuhime (1743-1743)
    - Tetsunosuke (1747-1752)
    - Nakahime (1751-1779) married Ikeda Shigehiro
    - Setsuhime (1756-1815) married Mori Haruchika
  - Concubine: Oyama no Kata later Kaisen-in
    - Shukuhime (1744-1815) married Nabeshima Shigeharu
    - Matsudaira Sadanobu
    - Matsudaira Sadakuni (1757-1804) inherited Iyo-Matsuyama Domain
    - Mikuzumi (1747-1753)
    - Tanehime (1765-1794) married Tokugawa Harutomi
    - Sadahime (1767-1813) married Matsudaira Haruyoshi
  - Concubine: Omori no Kata
    - Otogiku (1752-1753)
  - Concubine: Hayashi no Kata
    - Osamuhime (1756-1820) married Sakai Tadanori

Preceded by None	Tayasu-Tokugawa family head 1731–1771	Succeeded by Tokugawa Haruaki
