= Meiwa =

Period of Japanese history (1764–1772)

Meiwa (明和) was a Japanese era name (年号, nengō; "year name") after Hōreki and before An'ei. This period spanned the years from June 1764 through November 1772. The reigning empress and emperor were Go-Sakuramachi-tennō (後桜町天皇) and Go-Momozono-tennō (後桃園天皇).

== Change of era ==
- 1764 Meiwa gannen (明和元年): The era name became Meiwa (meaning "Bright Harmony") because of the enthronement of Empress Go-Sakuramachi.

As a cultural phenomenon, the literature of this period records concerted attempts to distill the aggregate characteristics of the inhabitants of Edo (Edokko) into a generalized thumbnail description. These traits (Edokko katagi) were put into use to draw a contrast between Edokko and those who did not have this "sophisticated" gloss—those not from the city, as in merchants from the Kyoto-Osaka region or samurai from distant provinces. Sometimes Edokko katagi was presented with pride; and it was used mockingly.

== Events ==
- 1765 (Meiwa 2): Five-momme coin issued.
- 1766 (Meiwa 3): A planned insurrection to displace the Shōgun was thwarted.
- 1768 (Meiwa 5): Five-momme usage halted.
- 1770 (Meiwa 7): A typhoon flattened the newly built Imperial Palace in Kyoto.
- 1770 (Meiwa 7): A great comet (Lexell's Comet) with a very long tail lit up the night skies throughout the summer and autumn.
- 1770 (Meiwa 7): Although no one could have known it at the time, this was the first of 15 consecutive years of drought in Japan.
- April 1, 1772 (Meiwa 9, 29th day of the 2nd month): "The Great Meiwa Fire"—one of the three greatest Edo fire disasters. Unofficial reports describe a swath of ashes and cinders nearly five miles wide and 15 miles (24 km) long—destroying 178 temples and shrines, 127 daimyō residences, 878 non-official residences, 8705 houses of bannermen, and 628 blocks of merchant dwellings, with estimates of over 6,000 casualties. All this devastation subsequently engendered the staggering costs of reconstruction.
- August 2, 1772 (Meiwa 9, 4th day of the 6th month): A terrible tempest hit the Kantō bringing floods and ruining crops.
- August 17, 1772 (Meiwa 9, 19th day of the 6th month): Another storm with more flooding and winds no less intense blew down an estimated 4000 houses in Edo alone.
- 1772 (Meiwa 9): At the time, it was said that "Meiwa 9 is Year of Trouble" because it was marked by an extraordinary succession of natural calamities. The pun was made linking the words "Meiwa" + "ku" (meaning "Meiwa 9") and the sound-alike word "meiwaku" (meaning "misfortune" or "annoyance").
- 1772 (Meiwa 9, 11th month): The nengō was changed to Anei (meaning "eternal tranquillity"), but this symbolic act was proved futile.

== Notes ==
| Preceded by Hōreki (宝暦) | Era or nengō Meiwa (明和); 1764–1772 | Succeeded by An'ei (安永) |
