= Kanpō =

Period of Japanese history (1741–1744)

Kanpō (寛保) was a Japanese era name (年号, nengō; lit. "year name"), also known as Kampō, after Genbun and before Enkyō. This period spanned the years from February 1741 through February 1744. The reigning emperor was Sakuramachi-tennō (桜町天皇).

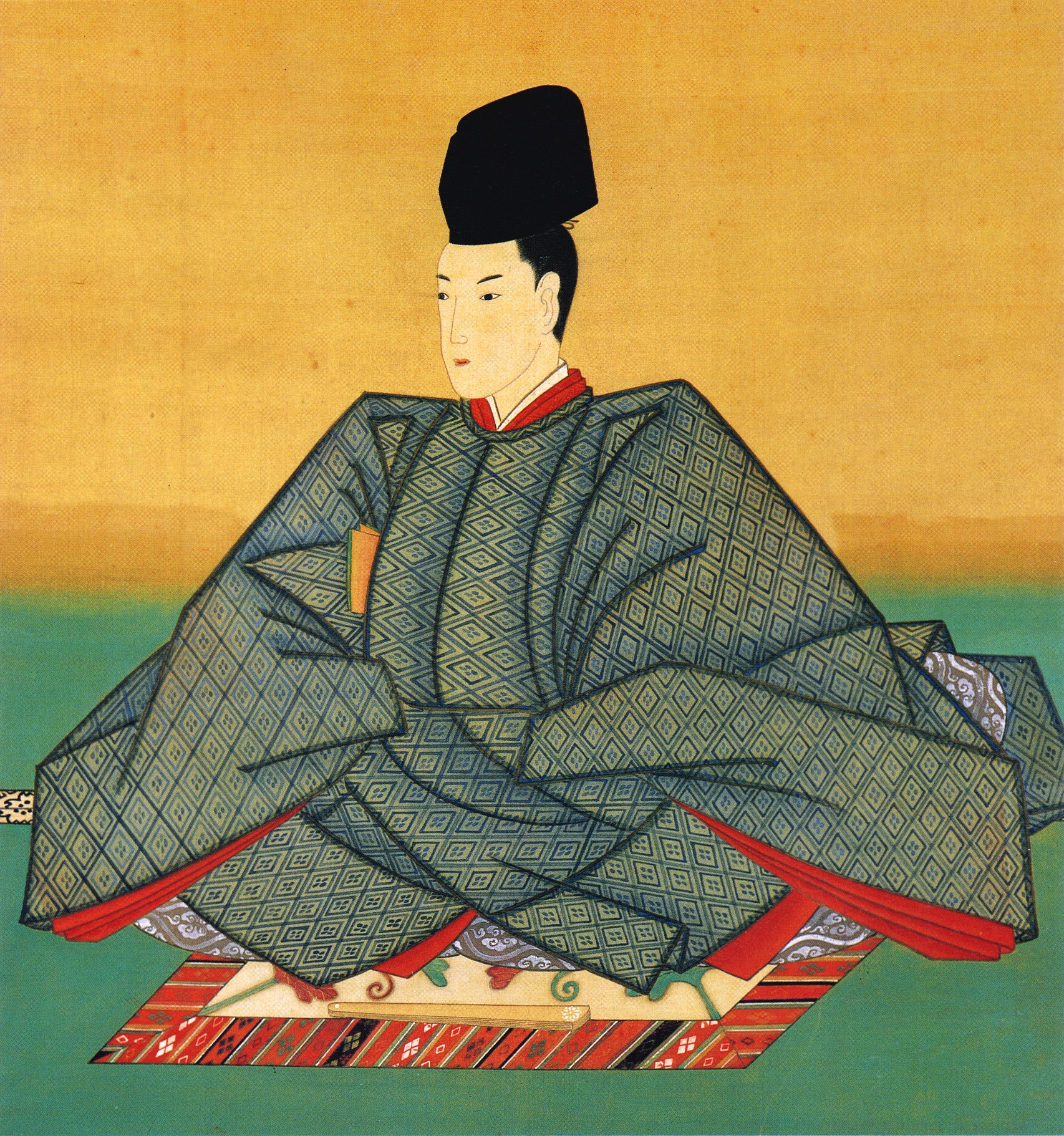
Portrait of the Emperor Sakuramachi by Kazahaya Shōshō

== Change of era ==
- 1741 Kanpō gannen (寛保元年): Based on the belief in Chinese astrology that the 58th year of the sexagenary cycle brings changes, the era name was changed to Kanpō (meaning "Keeping Lenient and Generous"). The previous era ended and the new one commenced in Genbun 6, on the 27th day of the 2nd month.

== Events of the Kanpō era ==
- 1742 (Kanpō 2): A comet was seen in the sky.
- 1742 (Kanpō 2, 8th month): Persistent heavy rains create floods throughout the country, with noteworthy devastation in Musashi province, Kōzuke province, Shimotsuke province, and Shinano province. In Heian-kyō, the Sanjo Bridge is washed away in this destructive storm cycle.
- 1743 (Kanpō 3, 11th month): A comet was sighted in the night sky; and this comet is likely to have been what is today identified as C/1743 X1 (De-Cheseaux).

== Notes ==
Preceded by Genbun (元文)	Era or nengō Kanpō (寛保); 1741–1744	Succeeded by Enkyō (延享)
