= Emperor Momozono =

Emperor of Japan from 1747 to 1762

Emperor Momozono 桃園天皇
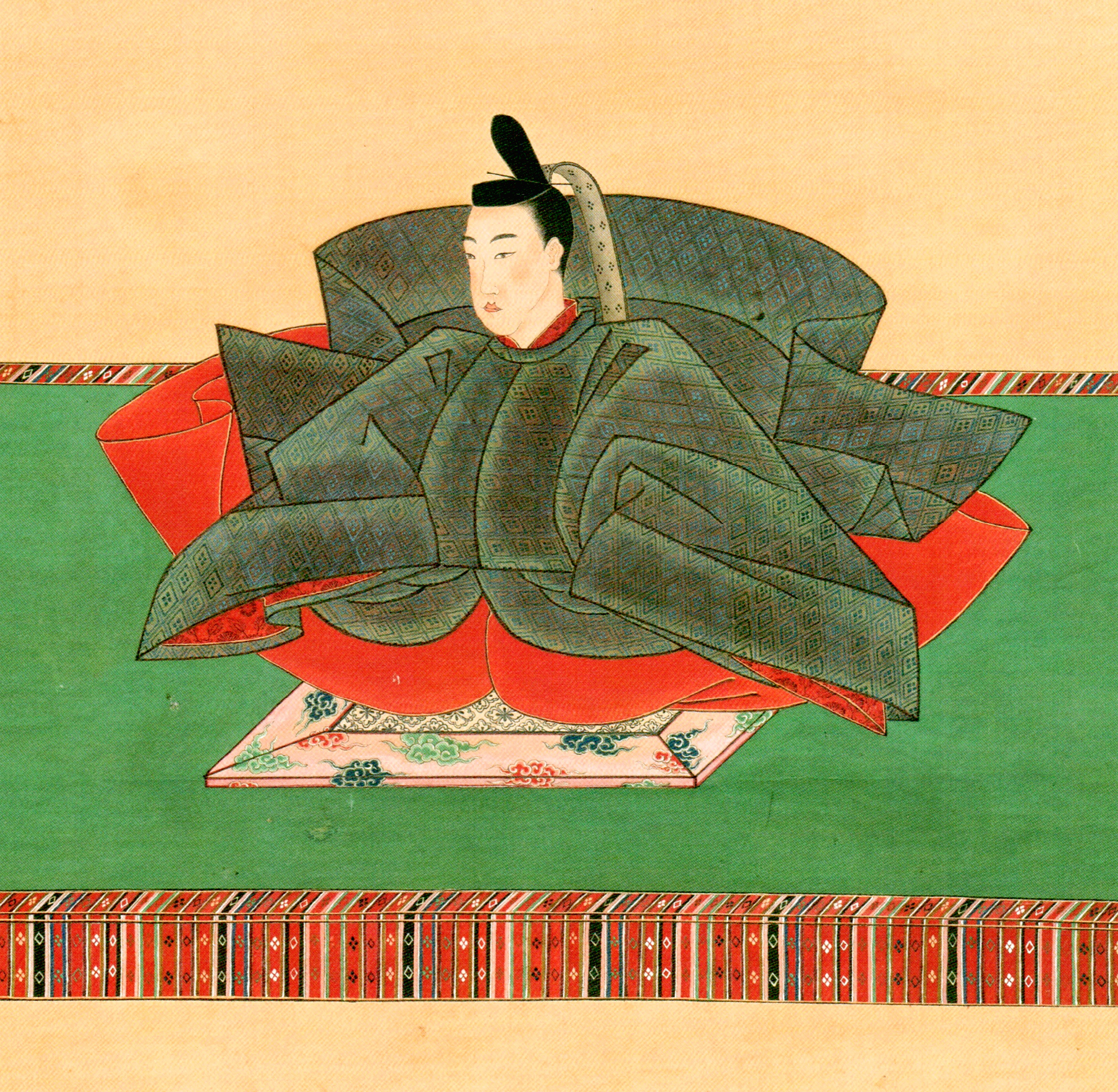
- Portrait by Hiramatsu Tokiyuki, 1762

Emperor of Japan
- Reign: 9 June 1747 – 31 August 1762
- Predecessor: Sakuramachi
- Successor: Go-Sakuramachi
- Shōguns: See list: Tokugawa Ieshige (1747–1760) Tokugawa Ieharu (1760–1762)
- Born: Tōhito (遐仁); 14 April 1741; Kyoto, Tokugawa shogunate
- Died: 31 August 1762 (aged 21); Kyoto, Tokugawa shogunate
- Burial: Tsuki no wa no misasagi, Kyoto
- Spouse: Ichijō Tomiko
- Issue: Emperor Go-Momozono; Prince Sadamochi
Posthumous name
- Tsuigō: Emperor Momozono (桃園院 or 桃園天皇)
- House: Imperial House of Japan
- Father: Emperor Sakuramachi
- Mother: Anegakōji Sadako
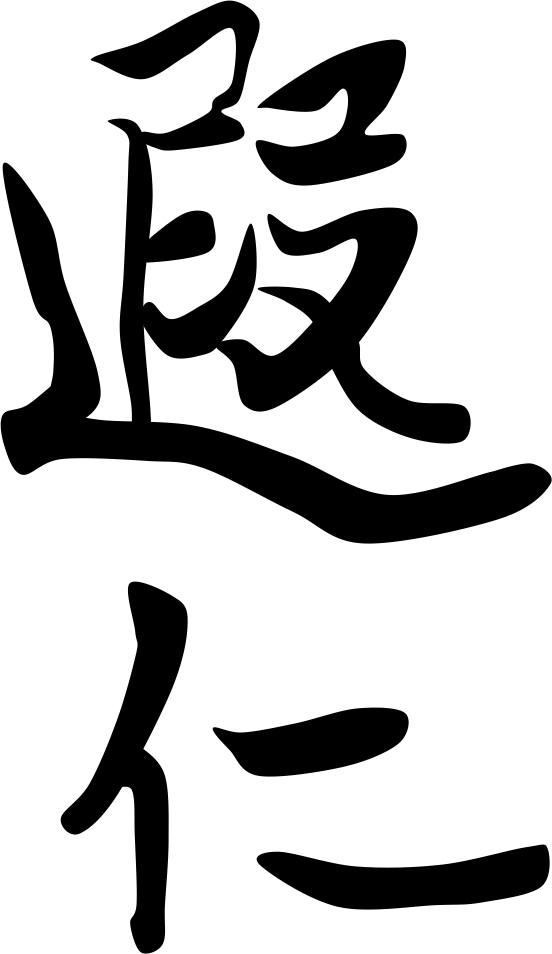
- Signature

Emperor Momozono (Japanese: 桃園天皇, Hepburn: Momozono-tennō; 14 April 1741 – 31 August 1762), personal name Tōhito, was the 116th emperor of Japan, according to the traditional order of succession. Momozono's reign spanned the years from 1747 until his death in 1762. Momozono's reign was mostly quiet, with only one incident occurring that involved a small number of kuge who advocated for the restoration of direct imperial rule. These kuge were punished by the shōgun, who held de facto power in the country.

Momozono fathered two sons with his one and only lady-in-waiting, but he died at a young age in 1762. The line of succession fell to Momozono's sister, Princess Toshiko, who became Empress Go-Sakuramachi. Due to the young age of Momozono's sons, she also became empress regent to the future Emperor Go-Momozono until he became of age to rule.

== Events of Momozono's life ==
=== Early life ===
Before Momozono's ascension to the Chrysanthemum Throne, his personal name (imina) was Tōhito (遐仁). Tōhito was the firstborn son of Emperor Sakuramachi, while his mother was a concubine named Sadako (定子) (Empress Dowager Kaimei, 開明門院). His Imperial family lived with him in the Dairi of the Heian Palace. Tōhito's pre-accession title was initially Yaho-no-miya (八穂宮) and later Sachi-no-miya (茶地宮). While Prince Tōhito was invested as Crown Prince on 25 April 1747 it is unknown what other events took place in his early life other than the information provided here.

=== Reign ===
Prince Tōhito acceded to the throne on 9 June 1747 as Emperor when his father abdicated in his favor. The era name was then changed from Enkyō to Kan'en (meaning "Prolonging Lenience") to mark the occasion. Momozono fathered at least two sons with a court lady named Ichijō Tomiko during his reign. While he held the political title of Emperor, it was in name only as the shōguns of the Tokugawa family controlled Japan. During the first year or so of Momozono's reign the first performance of the popular eleven-act puppet play Kanadehon Chūshingura was performed. The fictionalized story of the play is about samurai revenge, and the 1702 vendetta of the 47 rōnin. Also of note was a Ryukyuan diplomatic mission from Shō Kei of the Ryūkyū Kingdom which was received by the shogunate. On 7 October 1749 a powerful storm struck Kyoto, and the keep of Nijō Castle burned after it was struck by lightning. The era name was changed to Hōreki in 1751 to mark the death of the retired Emperor Sakuramachi, and the death of the former shōgun Tokugawa Yoshimune. In the year that followed a second Ryukyuan diplomatic mission from Shō Boku of the Ryūkyū Kingdom arrived in Edo. Momozono had no role in these missions as they were expected to pay tribute to the shogunate.

The 1754 Hōreki River incident caused the deaths of eighty-eight people due to a harsh project ordered by the shōgun, but again the Emperor was not involved. Another incident though occurred in 1758, when a small number of kuge were punished by the shogunate for advocating the restoration of direct imperial rule. Two years later Shōgun Ieshige resigned, and his son became the 10th shōgun of the Tokugawa shogunate. In 1762, Emperor Momozono abdicated the throne in favor of his sister Imperial Princess Toshiko, who became Empress Go-Sakuramachi. His retirement did not last long as he died that same year on 31 August 1762 at the age of 20. Momozono's kami is enshrined in an Imperial mausoleum (misasagi), Tsuki no wa no misasagi, at Sennyū-ji in Higashiyama-ku, Kyoto. Also enshrined here are Momozono's immediate Imperial predecessors since Emperor Go-Mizunoo – Meishō, Go-Kōmyō, Go-Sai, Reigen, Higashiyama, Nakamikado and Sakuramachi, along with five of his immediate Imperial successors – Go-Sakuramachi, Go-Momozono, Kōkaku, Ninkō, and Kōmei.

== Eras and Kugyō ==
The years of Momozono's reign are more specifically identified by more than one era name or nengō. While Kugyō (公卿) is a collective term for the very few most powerful men attached to the court of the Emperor of Japan in pre-Meiji eras. Even during those years in which the court's actual influence outside the palace walls was minimal, the hierarchic organization persisted. In general, this elite group included only three to four men at a time. These were hereditary courtiers whose experience and background would have brought them to the pinnacle of a life's career.

The following eras occurred during Momozono's reign:

- Enkyō (1744–1748)
- Kan'en (1748–1751)
- Hōreki (1751–1764)

During Momozono's reign, this apex of the Daijō-kan included:

- Kampaku, Konoe Uchisaki.
- Sadaijin
- Udaijin
- Naidaijin
- Dainagon

== Genealogy ==
Emperor Momozono had only one lady-in-waiting named Ichijō Tomiko, and fathered at least two sons with her.

Position	Name	Birth	Death	Father
Lady-in-waiting	Ichijō Tomiko (一条富子)	1743	1796	Ichijō Kaneka
First son	Imperial Prince Hidehito (英仁親王) (later Emperor Go-Momozono)	1758	1779	Emperor Momozono
Second son	Imperial Prince Fushimi-no-miya Sadamochi (伏見宮貞行親王)	1760	1772	Emperor Momozono

== Ancestry ==
Ancestors of Emperor Momozono

8. Emperor Higashiyama (1675–1710)
4. Emperor Nakamikado (1702–1737)
9. Kushige Yoshiko (1675–1710)
2. Emperor Sakuramachi (1720–1750)
10. Konoe Iehiro (1667–1736)
5. Konoe Hisako (1702–1720)
11. Machijiri Ryōko
1. Emperor Momozono
12. Anegakōji Kinkazu (1651–1723)
6. Anegakōji Mitake (1696–1726)
3. Anegakōji Sadako (1717–1789)

== See also ==
- Emperor of Japan
- List of Emperors of Japan
- Imperial cult

== Notes ==
Japanese Imperial kamon — a stylized chrysanthemum blossom

Regnal titles
Preceded by Emperor Sakuramachi	Emperor of Japan: Momozono; 1747–1762	Succeeded by Empress Go-Sakuramachi
