= Tokugawa Haruaki =

Japanese samurai

Tokugawa Haruaki (徳川 治察, 1753–1774), also known as Tayasu Haruaki (田安 治察) was a Japanese samurai of the mid-Edo period. The 5th son of Tokugawa Munetake with his wife Konoe Moriko (1721-1786), posthumously named Horen-in, he succeeded his father as head of the Tayasu branch of the Tokugawa house. His childhood name was Kotobuki-maro (寿麻呂) and later Suemaru (寿丸).

Preceded by Tokugawa Munetake	Tayasu-Tokugawa family head 1771–1774	Succeeded by Tokugawa Narimasa
