= Shōtoku (era) =

Period of Japanese history (1711–1716)

Shōtoku (正徳; Kyujitai: 正德) was a Japanese era name after Hōei and before Kyōhō. This period spanned the years from April 1711 through June 1716. The reigning emperor was Nakamikado (中御門天皇).

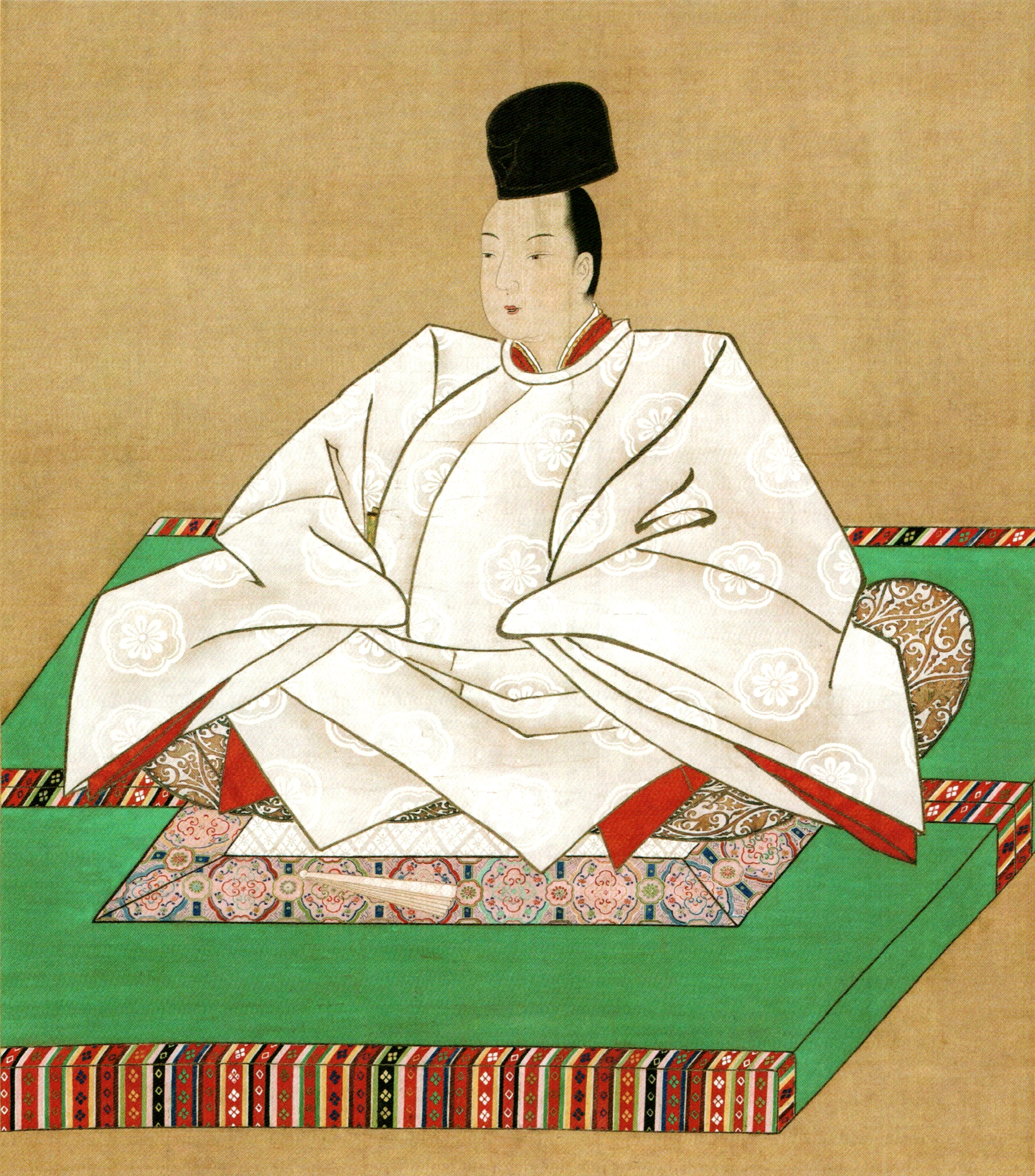
Portrait of the Emperor Nakamikado, the reigning emperor during the Shōtoku period.

== Change of Era ==
- 1711 Shōtoku gannen (正徳元年): The era name of Shōtoku (meaning "Righteous Virtue") was created to mark the enthronement of Emperor Nakamikado. The previous era ended and the new one commenced in Hōei 8, on the 25th day of the 4th month.

== Events of the Shōtoku Era ==
- 1711 (Shōtoku 1): An ambassador from Korea arrived at the court.
- November 12, 1712 (Shōtoku 2, 14th day of the 10th month): Shōgun Tokugawa Ienobu died.
- 1713 (Shōtoku 3): Minamoto no Ietsugu became the 7th shōgun of the Edo bakufu.
- 1714 (Shōtoku 4): The shogunate introduces new gold and silver coins into circulation.
- April 20, 1715 (Shōtoku 5, 17th day of the 3rd month): The 100th anniversary of the death of Tokugawa Ieyasu (posthumously known as Gongen-sama), which was celebrated throughout the empire.

== Notes ==
Preceded by Hōei (宝永)	Era or nengō Shōtoku (正徳); 1711–1716	Succeeded by Kyōhō (享保)
