= Enkyō (Edo period) =

Period of Japanese history (1744–1748)

Enkyō (延享) was a Japanese era name (年号, nengō; lit. "year name") after Kanpō and before Kan'en. This period spanned the years from February 1744 through July 1748. The reigning emperors were Sakuramachi-tennō (桜町天皇) and Momozono-tennō (桃園天皇).

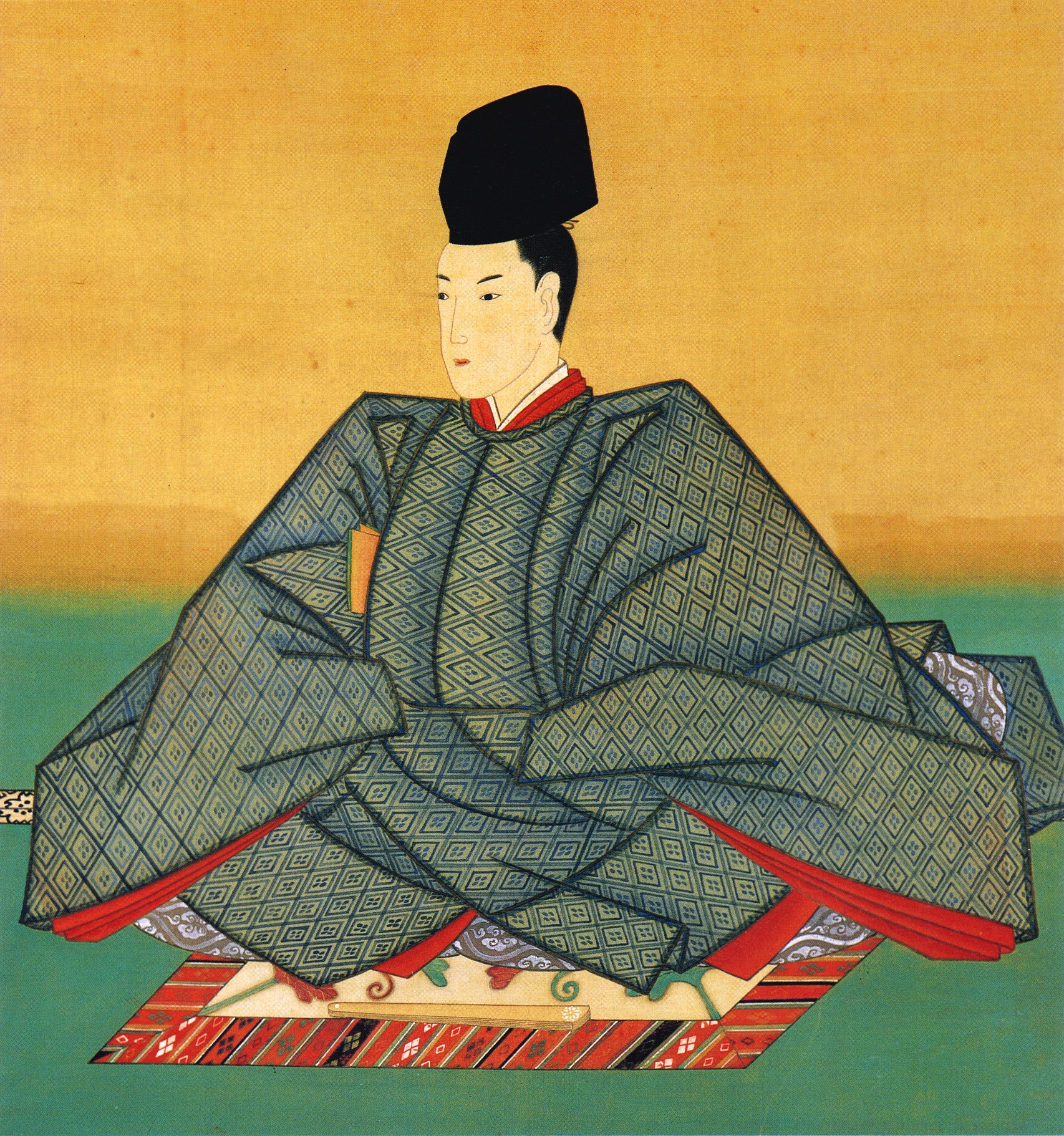
A picture of Emperor Sakuramachi

== Change of era ==
- 1744 Enkyō gannen (延享元年): The new era of Enkyō (meaning "Becoming Prolonged") was created to mark the start of a new 60-year cycle of the Chinese zodiac. The previous era ended and a new one commenced in Kampō 4, on the

== Events of Enkyō era ==
- 1744 (Enkyō 1): A great comet was visible in the sky for many months; this comet is likely to have been what is today identified as C/1743 X1 (De Cheseaux)....Click link for online Harvard-Smithsonian/NASA Astrophysics Data System
- 1745 (Enkyō 2): Tokugawa Ieshige became shōgun of the Edo bakufu.
- 1745 (Enkyō 2): First establishment of a market fair in the capital was to be found at the temple of Hirano, in the Ōmi province.
- 1746 (Enkyō 3, 2nd month): A great fire sweeps through Edo.

== Notes ==
Preceded by Kanpō (寛保)	Era or nengō Enkyō (延享); 1744–1748	Succeeded by Kan'en (寛延)
