= Kan'en =

Period of Japanese history (1748–1751)

Kan'en (寛延) was a Japanese era name (年号, nengō, lit. "year name") after Enkyō and before Hōreki. This period spanned the years from July 1748 to October 1751. The reigning emperor was Emperor Momozono (桃園天皇).

== Change of era ==
- 1748 Kan'en gannen (寛延元年): The era name was changed to Kan'en (meaning "Prolonging Lenience") to mark the enthronement of Emperor Momozono. The previous era ended and the new era commenced in Enkyō 5, on the 12th day of the 7th month.

== Events of the Kan'en era ==
- 1748 (Kan'en 1): The first performance of the eleven-act puppet play Kanadehon Chushingura (A copybook of the treasury of loyal retainers), depicting the classic story of samurai revenge, the 1702 vendetta of the Forty-seven rōnin.
- 1748 (Kan'en 1): Ambassadors from Korea and from the Ryukyu Islands were received at court in Heian-kyō.
- October 7, 1749 (Kan'en 2, 26th day of the 8th month): A terrific storm of wind and rain strikes Kyoto; and the keep of Nijō Castle is burnt after it was struck by lightning.

== Notes ==
Preceded by Enkyō (延享)	Era or nengō Kan'en (寛延); 1748–1751	Succeeded by Hōreki (宝暦)
