= Illustrations of Japan =

Book by Isaac Titsingh

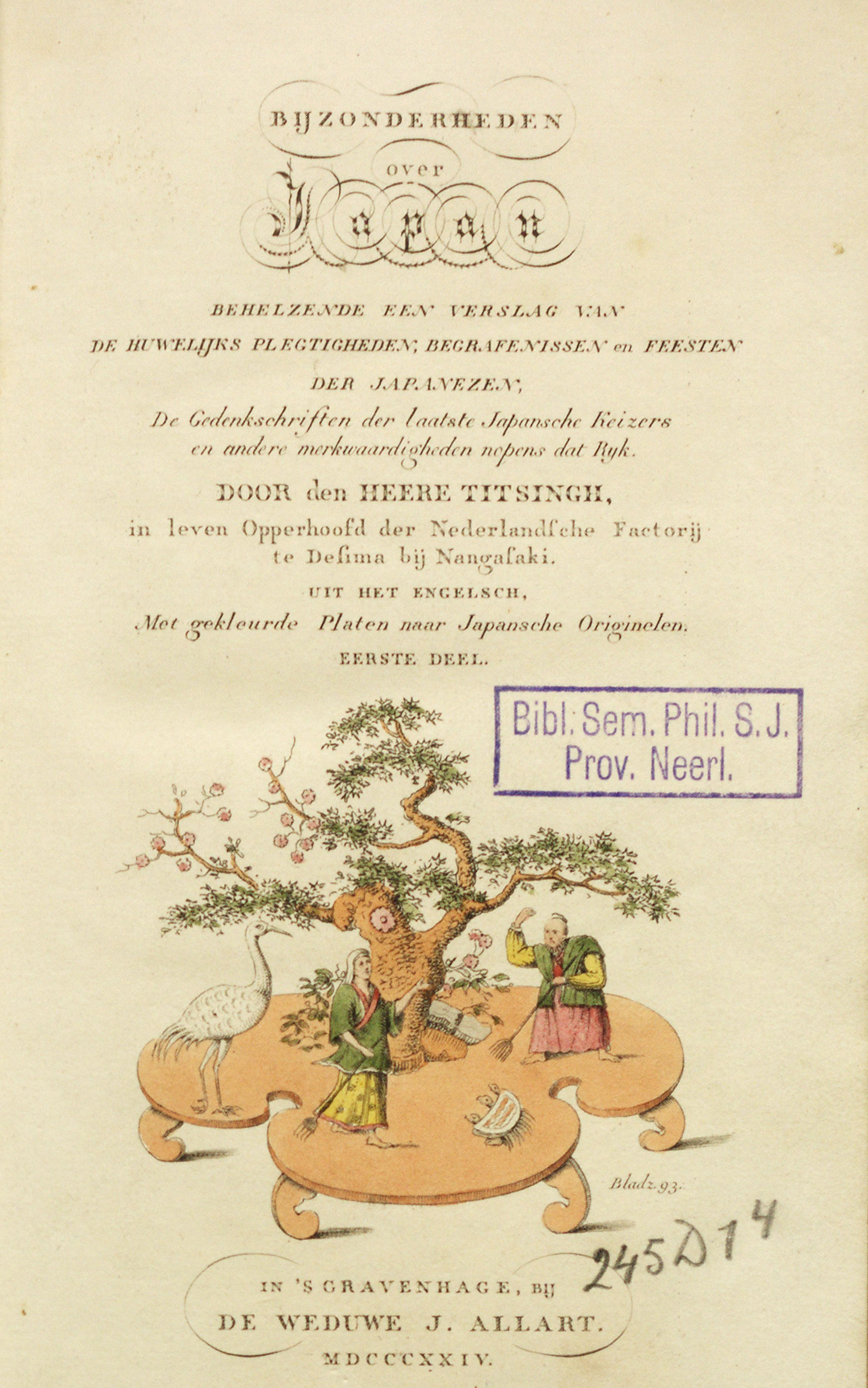
Bijzonderheden over Japan (1824). Title page of Part One.

Illustrations of Japan is a book on Japanese culture by the Dutch merchant and diplomat Isaac Titsingh. The book was first published posthumously in French under the editorship of his friends Jean-Pierre Abel-Rémusat and Heinrich Julius von Klaproth in 1820, followed by an English edition in 1822 and a Dutch edition in 1824.

The book surveys Japanese history, customs, and ceremonies during the Tokugawa shogunate and is a notable early account of Japan by a Western observer.

== About the book ==
The book recounts the observations of Titsingh during his stay in Dejima from 1779 to 1784 in his position as Dutch East India Company (VOC) senior official (opperhoofd). During his stay in Japan, Titsingh had the project of an overall collection on Japanese history, culture and civilization in mind. This project would be his life work and accomplishment. Therefore, he collected and translated data and wrote essays for his collection. In his perception this collection was important in order to show and present the high degree of sophistication of the Japanese people and the importance of the Japanese states, which the Europeans should be informed about. In addition, he also possessed enough and vital material, which would add to the otherwise lack of material on Japan in the 18th century.

Titsingh wished to have his collection published in three European languages, important to him: Dutch (his native language), French (language of philosophy) and English, the language which was important for the scientific, natural and modern sciences in the 18th century. He planned to have his book divided into two parts, the first one being a history of Japan, including biographies of the emperors and complemented with biographies on the shoguns of the then-reigning Tokugawa clan, and about the Japanese culture, conditions and customs. This part would consist of a discussion on an individual's life cycle and occasions, including marriage and death, as birth is not a special occasion in Buddhism in Japan.

Within this scope he wanted to only include original sources in translations by himself into the collection, as he believed this would distinguish his work from other Japanese travel accounts and stories. Nevertheless, after he left Japan he did not have any access to more complimentary texts and lacked the help of Chinese and Japanese translators. As a consequence it took Titsingh an enormous amount of time to translate the sources and he could only edit some manuscripts or polish over, due to the lack of his fluency in Japanese.

In 1812 his collection was still not published and after his death, his two friends Jean-Pierre Abel-Rémusat and Heinrich Julius von Klaproth, who were both fluent in Chinese and von Klaproth in Japanese, sorted out the remains of his manuscripts and published his work posthumously. This Remusat-Klaproth edition was published in 1820 under the title of Memoires et anecdotes sur la dynastie regnante des djogouns (Memoirs and anecdotes on the reigning dynasty of shoguns). This posthumous work collection was a clear success and therefore an English edition was published in 1822 by Rudolph Ackermann, translated by well-known journalist Frederic Shoberl. As the original Dutch manuscript by Titsingh was lost, a new Dutch translation was created based on the English edition in 1824-25. A modern edition was edited by Timon Screech in 2006.

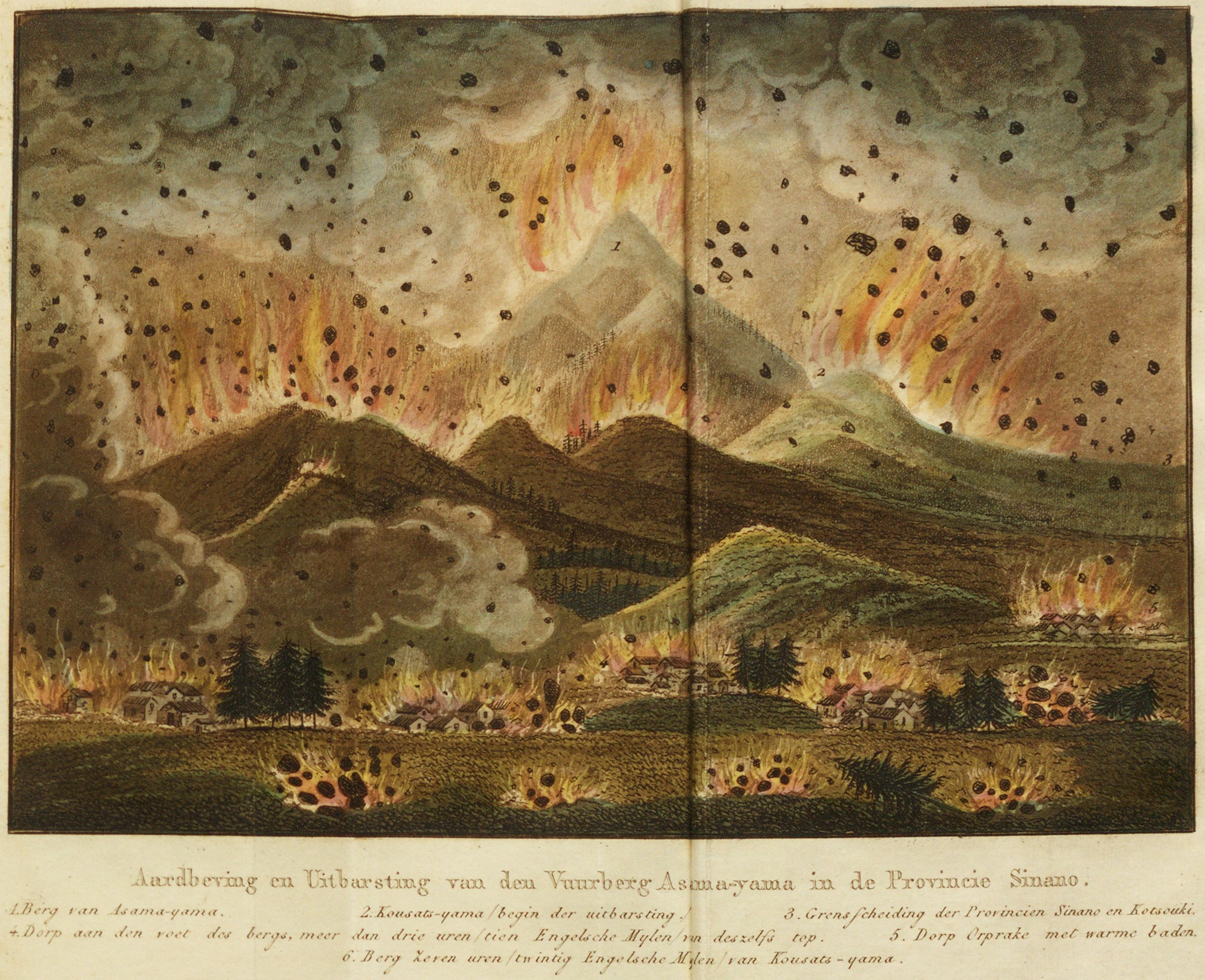
Bijzonderheden over Japan (1824). Illustration of the Tenmei eruption of Mount Asama.

== Contents ==
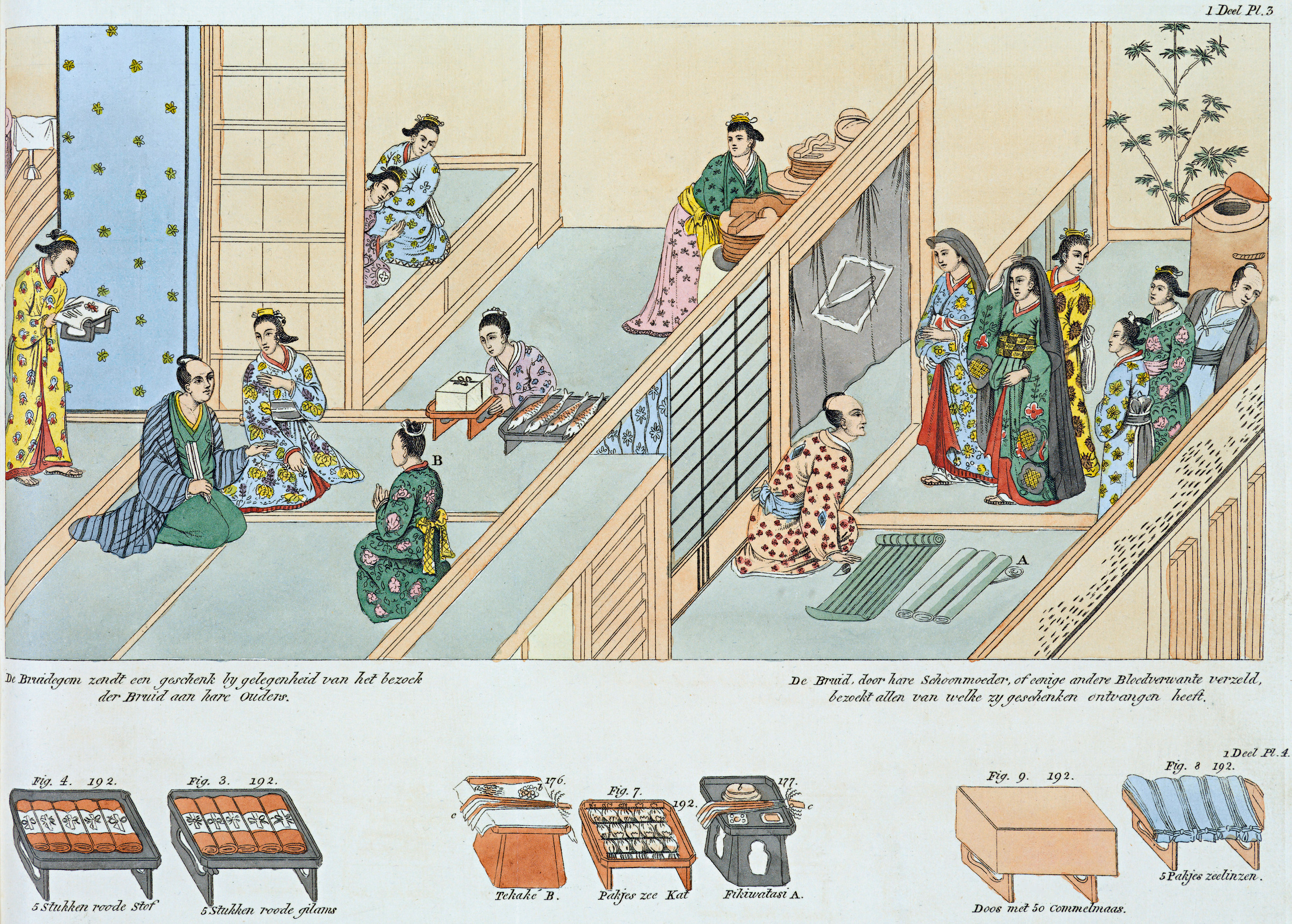
Bijzonderheden over Japan (1824). First illustration of a wedding ceremony.

In the book, Titsingh covers the following topics:

- A history of the Japanese, starting from the Middle Ages until the reigning dynasty of shoguns during the Tokugawa era
- Feasts and ceremonies observed at the court of the shoguns
- Legal suicide of the Japanese
- Essays on Japanese poetry
- Weights and coins
- Explanations on the year division of the Japanese
- Description of plans of the Dutch and Chinese factories at Nagasaki, during Titsingh's times at the end of the 18th century
- The life cycles of a Japanese: marriage and funerals
- Essays on the Dosia powder
- Essays on the work of Confucius

=== Part One ===
The first part of the book describes the history of Japan, feasts and ceremonies at the court, the procedures of legal suicide, Japanese poetry and division of the year as well as coins and weights of the Japanese. In addition, a very detailed description of the factory of the Dutch and Chinese in Nagasaki is included.

The chapter Private Memoirs of the Shoguns is focusing on the several shoguns, their lives and rule. It contains an extensive amount of biographies and histories on the individual shoguns and their families. The second chapter, on feasts and ceremonies, describes for each month of the year a certain festival or ceremony the shogun celebrates. Moreover, other great festivals of the Japanese are discussed such as the feast of lamps or lanterns.

The chapter on legal suicide depicts the procedures of legal suicide of the Japanese. The chapter on Japanese poetry translates some parts of Japanese poetry into English and gives a small account on the details and characteristics. The chapter on the division of the year among the Japanese depicts the counting of the days, months and seasons as well as Chinese zodiacs in tables. The essay on the weights and coins of the Japanese show the values and counting of the Japanese in numbers and conversions of weights and coins. The description of plans of the Dutch and Chinese factories include the history of these two and describe the conditions and positions of certain buildings, the islands and the area.

=== Part Two ===
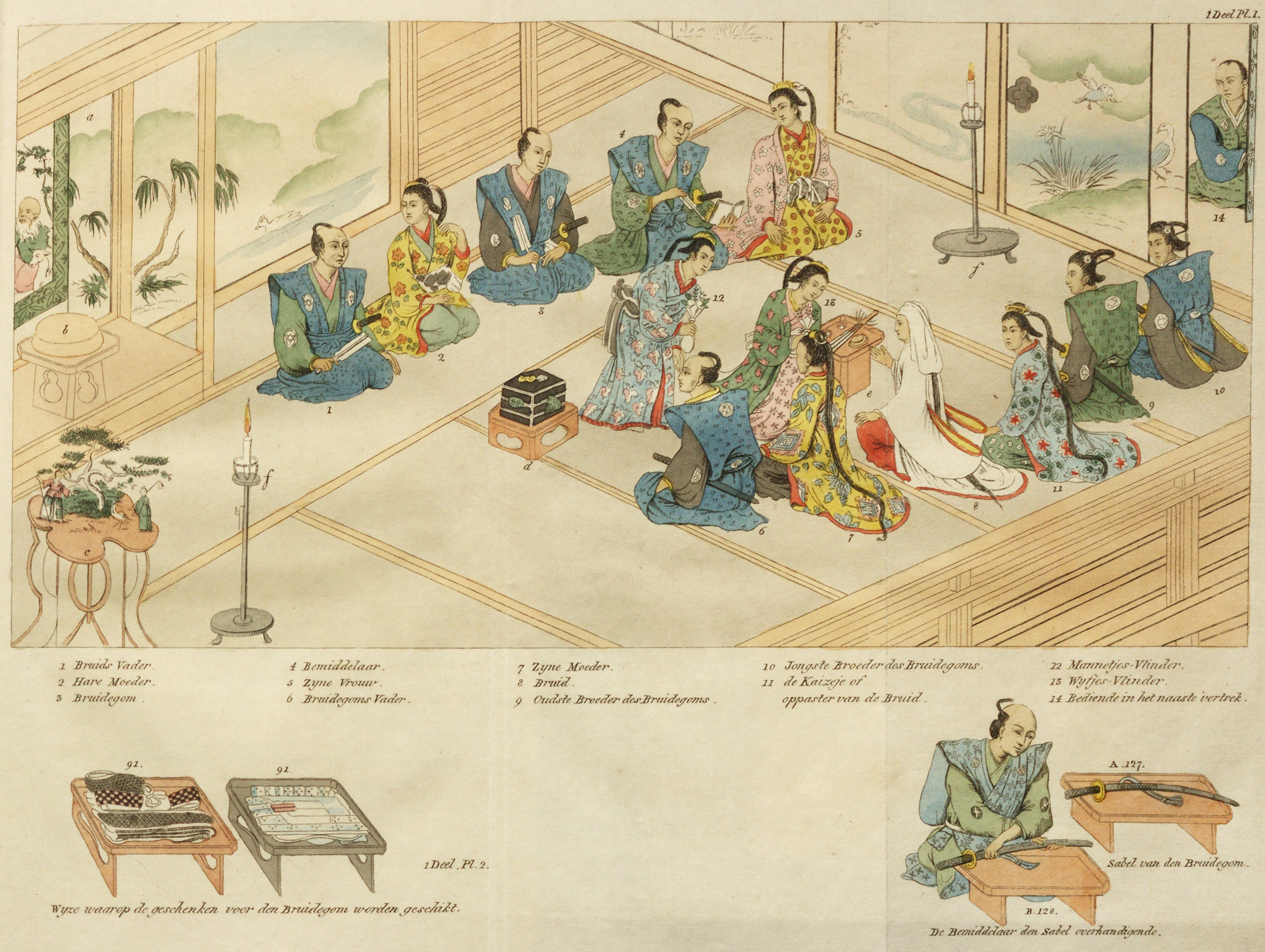
Bijzonderheden over Japan (1824). Second illustration of a wedding ceremony.

The second part of the book is focusing on customs and cultural events of the Japanese.

The chapters Description of the Marriage Ceremonies and the Japanese, Description of Marriage Ceremonies of Farmers, Artisans and Tradesmen and Japanese Words in the Description of the Marriage are concerned about the procedures, gifts, pieces of furniture and arrangements of a typical Japanese wedding during the Tokugawa era. Moreover, there are some illustrations depicting the marriage procedures and explanations of these marriage depiction plates. Japanese words important to the wedding ceremonies procedure descriptions are translated and explained.

The chapters Description of the Funerals of the Japanese, Description of Ceremonies practiced in Japan at Funerals and Funerals Festivals of the Japanese describe the procedures of funerals and the festivals, which are practiced to honour the gods on these ceremonies. Funeral arrangements and roles during the ceremony are explained and procedures and special instruments used in the funeral ceremonies depicted.

The two remaining essays Account of Dosia Powder and Note on the Works of Confoutzee depict the peculiarities and functions of the Dosia Powder that is used in Japanese funerals as observed by Titsingh, and selected works and principles of Confucius, collected and translated by the same.

== Reception ==
=== Contemporary reviews ===
- Review in The Gentleman's Magazine of 1822 (pp 430–432)
- Review in The Eclectic Review of 1822 (pp 324–332)
- Review in The Monthly Review of 1822 (pp 337–350)

== Bibliography ==
- Mémoires et anecdotes sur la dynastie régnante des djogouns (auth Isaac Titsingh; pub 1820, Jean-Pierre Abel-Rémusat, Paris)
- Illustrations of Japan (auth Isaac Titsingh; tr Frederic Shoberl; pub 1822, R. Ackermann, London)
- Bijzonderheden over Japan (auth Isaac Titsingh; pub 1824, Wed. J. Allart, the Hague)
- Secret Memoirs of the Shoguns: Isaac Titsingh and Japan, 1779–1822 (auth Isaac Titsingh; ed Timon Screech; pub 2006, Routledge, New York)
