= Titsingh =

Titsingh is a Dutch surname. Notable people with the surname include:

- Abraham Titsingh (1684–1776), Dutch surgeon
- Isaac Titsingh (1745–1812), Dutch surgeon and diplomat; son of Abraham, Dutch East India Company governor general of Chinsura
