= Crathorne =

Crathorne may refer to:

- Crathorne, North Yorkshire, England
- Baron Crathorne
- Henry Crathorne

== See also ==
- Craythorne
