= Craythorne =

Craythorne is a surname. Notable people with the name include:

- Ben Craythorne, English footballer
- Erik Craythorne, American politician

== See also ==
- Crathorne
