= Frederic Shoberl =

English journalist, editor, translator, writer and illustrator

- Born: 1775; London, England
- Died: 1853
- Other names: Frederick Shoberl
- Known for: Editor, writer
- Children: Two

Frederic Shoberl (1775–1853), also known as Frederick Schoberl, was an English journalist, editor, translator, writer and illustrator. Shoberl edited Forget-Me-Not, the first literary annual, issued at Christmas "for 1823" and translated The Hunchback of Notre-Dame.

== Biography ==
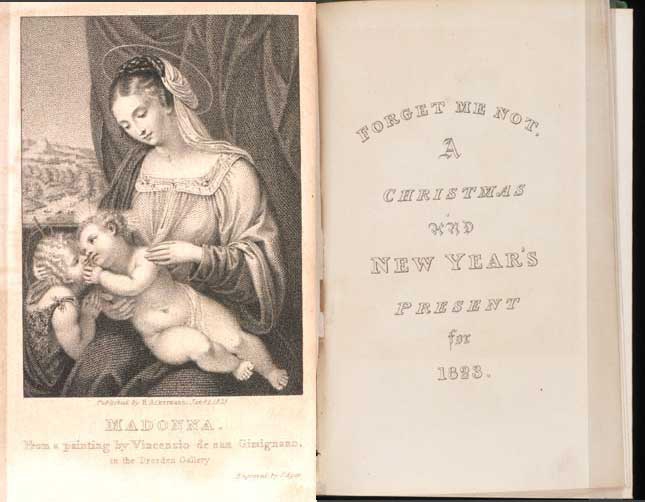
The title page and frontispiece from the Forget-Me-Not annual for 1823

Shoberl was born in London in 1775, and educated at the Moravian school at the Fulneck Moravian Settlement in West Yorkshire.

From 1809 he began editing Rudolph Ackermann's Repository of Arts which had just started and was only at its third edition. Ackermann was seen as the populariser of aquatint engraving and his Repository of Arts was intended to cover "arts, literature, commerce, manufactures, fashions, and politics". At the beginning of February 1814, Shoberl and Henry Colburn founded and became co-proprietors of The New Monthly Magazine. For some time Shoberl was editor, writing many of the articles and reviews and editing Ackermann's magazine.

From 27 June 1818 to 27 November 1819 he was printer and publisher of the Cornwall Gazette, Falmouth Packet, and Plymouth Journal. The last was published in Truro in Cornwall.

In 1822 he was the founding editor of Ackermann's Forget-Me-Not which was an annual, a new type of publication in England. This was the first literary annual in English Shoberl continued to edit the annual until 1834. Shoberl also began overseeing Ackermann's junior annual, The Juvenile Forget-Me-Not from 1828 until 1832.

In addition to these editing tasks, Shoberl was an illustrator. He created his own hand-coloured engravings for The World in Miniature: Hindoostan which was published in London by Ackermann in the 1820s.

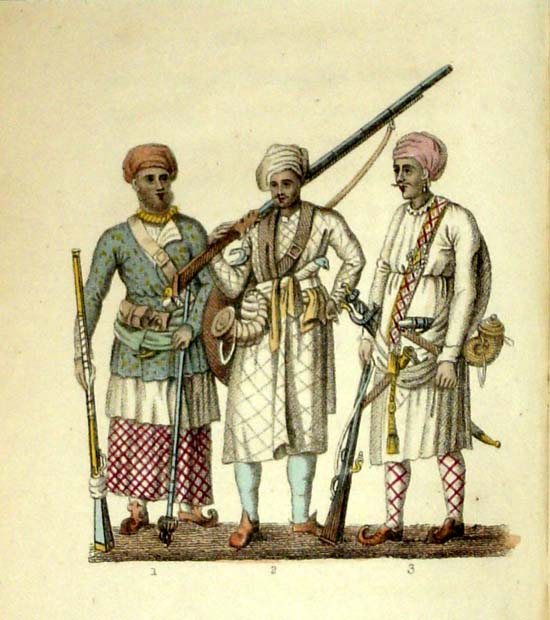
In the 1820s, Shoberl created these images of India: (1) A Seapoy in native attire; (2) a Hindu soldier; and (3) a Brigbasi.

Shoberl married Theodosia and they had two sons. William was an assistant to Henry Colburn, and then a publisher in Great Marlborough Street and Frederic, who was printer to Prince Albert in Rupert Street and died a year before his father. His wife died on 18 December 1838.

Shoberl died at Thistle Grove, Brompton, London, on 5 March 1853, and was buried in Kensal Green cemetery a week later.

== Legacy ==
In addition to the selected works below and his illustrations, Shoberl's editing is still being viewed. The Forget-Me-Not publications are being digitised because of their value. Poetry that was published includes works by Hester Thrale, Sir Walter Scott and Mary Wollstonecraft. The artwork that was included has also been digitised which continues Shoberl's poetry. It was the editor and publisher's job to identify and then borrow artwork for the magazine. Many of the artists chosen were Royal Academicians and a considerable fee would have to be negotiated. Once engraved the artwork was then used to solicit accompanying texts.

== Selected works ==
- 1812 – A topographical and historical description of the county of Surrey; containing an account of its towns, antiquities, public edifices, seats, churches, scenery, the residences of the nobility, gentry, &c. Accompanied with Biographical Notices of Eminent and Learned Men to whom this county has given birth London: Sherwood, Neely, and Jones
- 1814 – Narrative of the Most Remarkable Events Which Occurred in and Near Leipzig...14 to 19 October 1813 London: Ackermann (Compiled and translated from the German by Frederic Shoberl)
- 1816 – A biographical dictionary of the living authors of Great Britain and Ireland (with John Watkins and William Upcott)
- 1816 – A historical account, interspersed with biographical anecdotes, of the house of Saxony
- 1818 – Suffolk; or, Original delineations, Typographical, Historical, and Descriptive, of that County. The result of a personal survey by Mr. Shoberl. Illustrated with thirteen engravings and a map. London: Printed for J. Harris, corner of St. Paul's Churchyard. 1818. The Beauties of England and Wales. Vol. XIV Suffolk.
- 1821 – The World in Miniature
- 1822 – Illustrations of Japan; consisting of Private Memoirs and Anecdotes of the reigning dynasty of The Djogouns, or Sovereigns of Japan; a description of the Feasts and Ceremonies observed throughout the year at their Court; and of the Ceremonies customary at Marriages and Funerals: to which are subjoined, observations on the legal suicide of the Japanese, remarks on their poetry, an explanation of their mode of reckoning time, particulars respecting the Dosia powder, the preface of a work by Confoutzee on filial piety, &c. &c. by M. Titsingh, formerly Chief Agent to the Dutch East India Company at Nangasaki. Translated from the French, by Frederic Shoberl with coloured plates, faithfully copied from Japanese original designs. London: Ackermann.
- 1822 – Forget-Me-Not
- 1824 – Translation of Friedrich Adolf Krummacher: Parables; by F. A. K.,
- 1828 – Persia
- 1828 – Austria; containing a description of the manners, customs, character and costumes of the people of that empire (Philadelphia; digital edition on the website of the Austrian National Library:
- 1829 – Turkey, being a description of the manners, customs, dresses and other peculiarities characteristic of the inhabitants.
- 1833 – The Hunchback of Notre-Dame translation - just two years after the French publication.
- 1839 – The Language of Flowers.
- 1840 – Lights and Shades of Military Life, a translation of Alfred de Vigny's Servitude et grandeur militaires.
- 1843 – Frederick the Great, his court and times (with Thomas Campbell)

== Notes ==
Illustrations for a book called Daring Deeds of Elizabethan Heroes is also the work of Campbell.
