= Lequin =

Lequin is a surname. Notable people with the surname include:

- Bradley Lequin (born 1998), Canadian curler
- Frank Lequin (born 1946), Dutch orientalist
