= Harriet Downing =

British poet and novelist

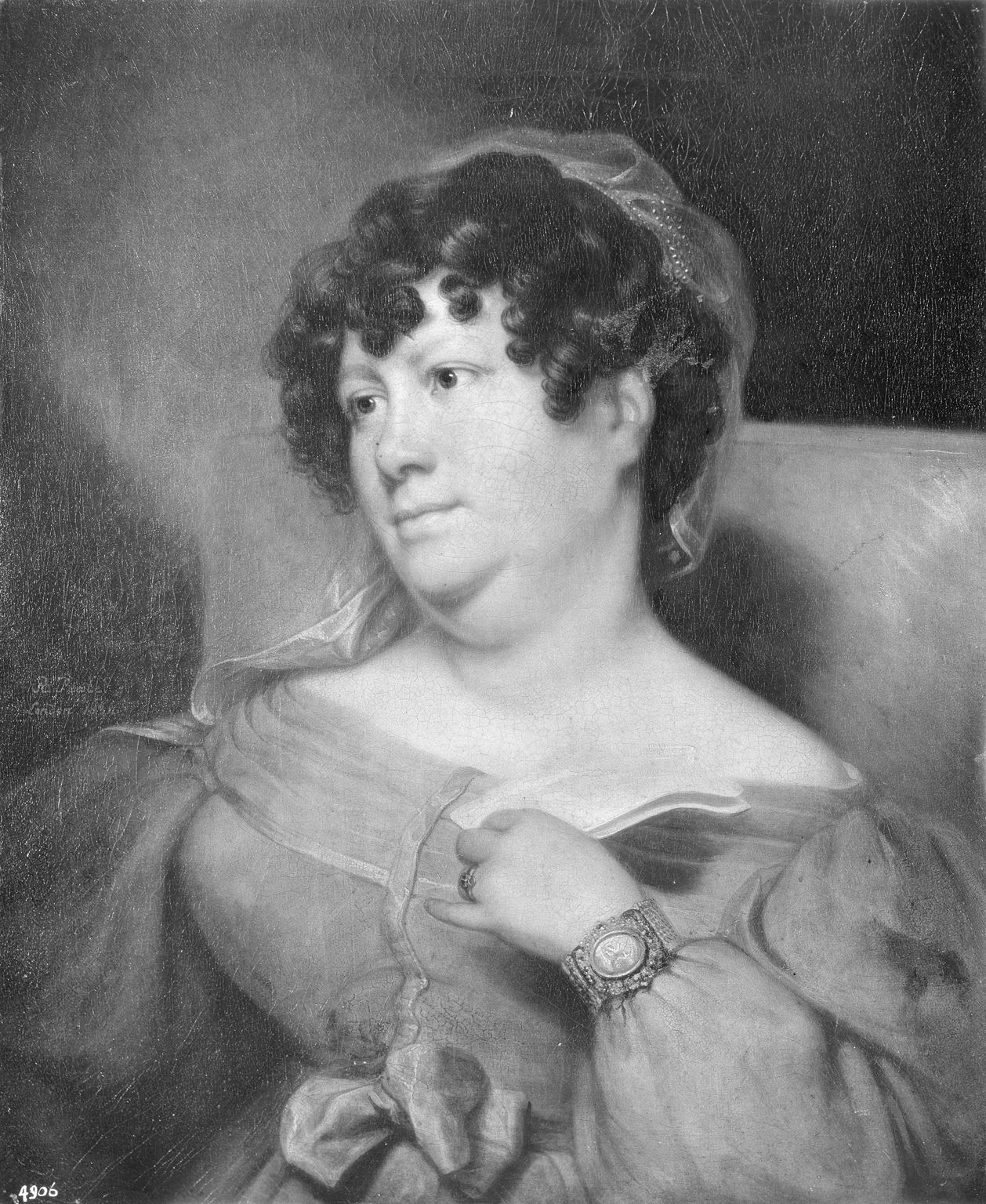
- portrait by Rembrandt Peale
- Born: 1778; London
- Baptised: 12 August 1778
- Died: 18 March 1845 (aged 66–67); Chipping Norton
- Occupation: Writer, poet

Harriet Bourne Downing Oliver (1778 – 18 March 1845) was a British poet and novelist.

== Life ==
Harriet Bourne was baptized at All Hallows' Church, Tottenham on 12 August 1778. She was the daughter of John Bourne and Frances Shuttleworth. In 1803 she married George William Downing, a vintner who wrote stage comedies and pamphlets on parliamentary reform. They had five children.

George Downing died around 1820 on a trip to the Cape of Good Hope. In 1829, she married her second husband, Charles Martin Oliver, a merchant.

Rembrandt Peale painted her portrait, dating it "London 1834". John Quincy Adams recorded seeing the portrait in his diary, in Washington, DC in December 1833.

Harriet Downing died of a stroke on 18 March 1845 in Chipping Norton.

== Writing ==
Downing published all of her works under the name Harriet Downing, including after her second marriage. She published two books of poetry by subscription, Mary; or, Female Friendship (1816) and The Child of the Tempest (1821). The former tells the story of an orphan, Mary, while the latter is a collection of romantic poetry.

Two dramatic poems followed: The Bride of Sicily (1830) and Satan In Love (1840). The heroine of each converts a Moor and Satan, respectively.

In 1836 she began publishing her series of prose vignettes, Remembrances of a Monthly Nurse, in Fraser's Magazine. The narrator, a widow from a respectable family, works as a monthly nurse and travels from family to family, frankly discussing issues like social class, murder, and suicide. They were collected posthumously in book form in 1852.

She published a children's book, How Fanny Teachers Her Children, and Odds and Ends (1836). She also contributed to publications including Forget-Me-Not and Bentley's Miscellany.

== Bibliography ==
- Mary; or, Female Friendship: A Poem, in Twelve Books London: for the author by James Harper, J. M. Richardson, T. and J. Allman, 1816
- The Child of the Tempest; and Other Poems London: J. Harwood, 1821
- The Bride of Sicily, a Dramatic Poem London: Hurst, Chance, and Co., and John Sams, 1830
- How Fanny Teachers Her Children, and Odds and Ends, 1836
- Satan In Love: A Dramatic Poem London, 1840
- Remembrances of a Monthly Nurse, 1852.
