= Andreas Everardus van Braam Houckgeest =

Dutch-American merchant

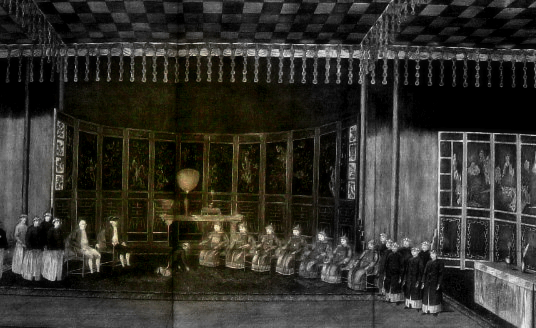
Illustration depicting the last European delegation to be received at the Qianlong Court in 1795 -- Isaac Titsingh (seated European with hat, far right) and A.E. van Braam Houckgeest (seated European without hat). This nearly-contemporaneous artwork had been specifically commissioned by van Braam for inclusion in his 1798 book describing the Titsingh's mission to "Pekin" three years earlier.

Andreas Everardus van Braam Houckgeest (1 November 1739 in Werkhoven – 8 July 1801 in Amsterdam) was a Dutch-American merchant, who is mostly known for his participation in the last Dutch embassy to China under the tributary system.

== Early career ==
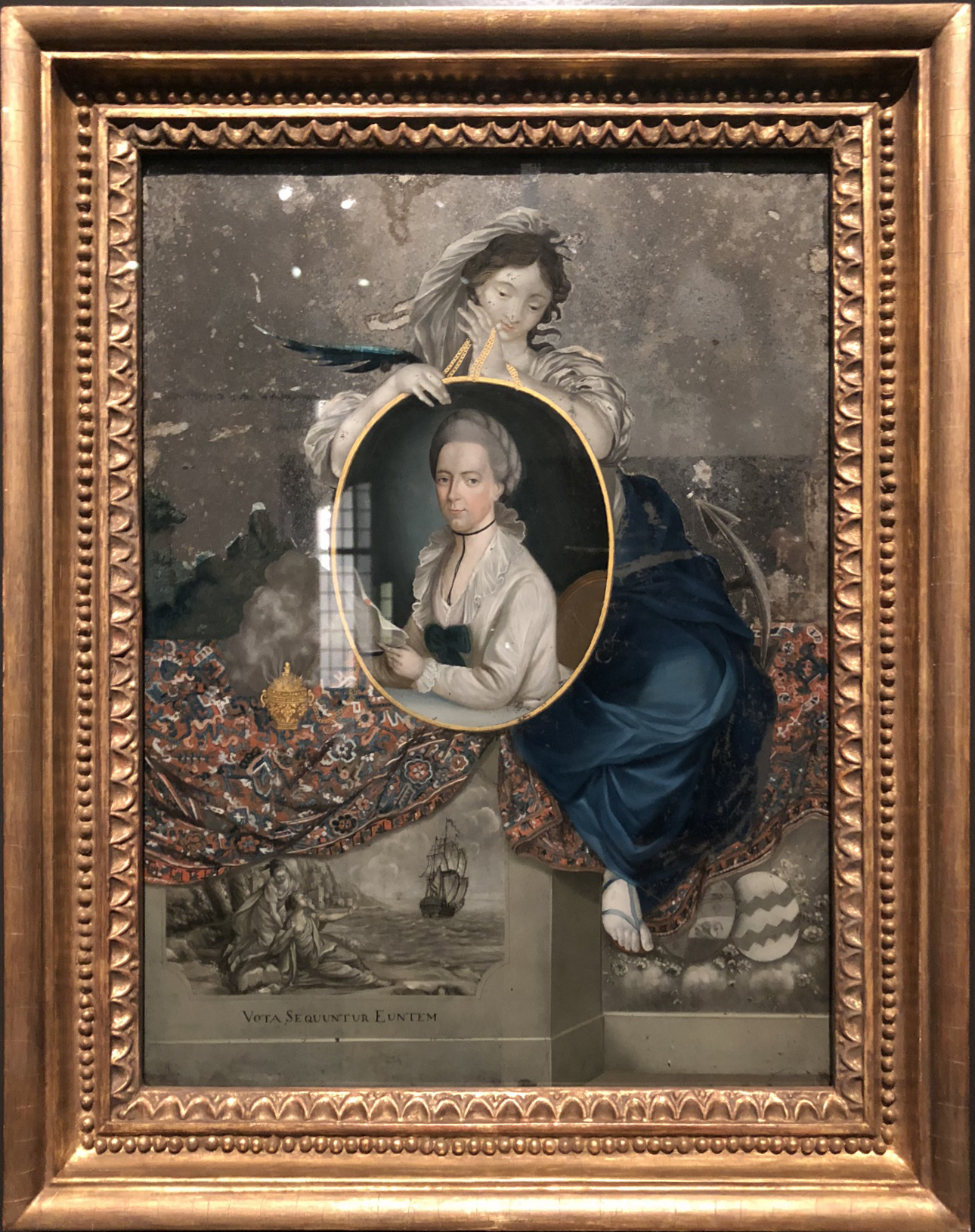
Portrait of Catharina van Braam Houckgeest by unknown artist

In 1757, van Braam joined the Dutch Navy as a midshipman, but soon left the navy for China in order to work for the Dutch East India Company (VOC). In 1758, van Braam arrived in China, and for the following eight years he was engaged in trade in Guangzhou and Macau. During his sojourn in China, he left for Europe twice, and married Catharina Cornelia Geertruida van Reede van Oudthoorn during his last visit.

In 1773, van Braam left China and the following year, he settled in a county-seat near Zutphen in the province of Gelderland. Inspired by the American Revolution, he decided to immigrate to the United States and settled in Charleston to work as a merchant and rice planter in 1783. He became a US citizen the following year. As a consequence of a family tragedy, van Braam decided to leave the US, and take up a position as chief of the Dutch factory in Guangzhou. After a long journey, with stops in the Netherlands, Malacca, and Batavia, he arrived in Guangzhou in 1790.

== Embassy to China ==
Having learned about the British Macartney Embassy to the Qing court in 1793, he requested that the commissioners-general in Batavia send a VOC embassy to the court of the Qianlong Emperor for the celebration of his sixtieth year on the throne. Batavia accepted the suggestion, but appointed the chief of the Dutch trading mission in Dejima, Isaac Titsingh, as head of the Dutch embassy instead of van Braam.

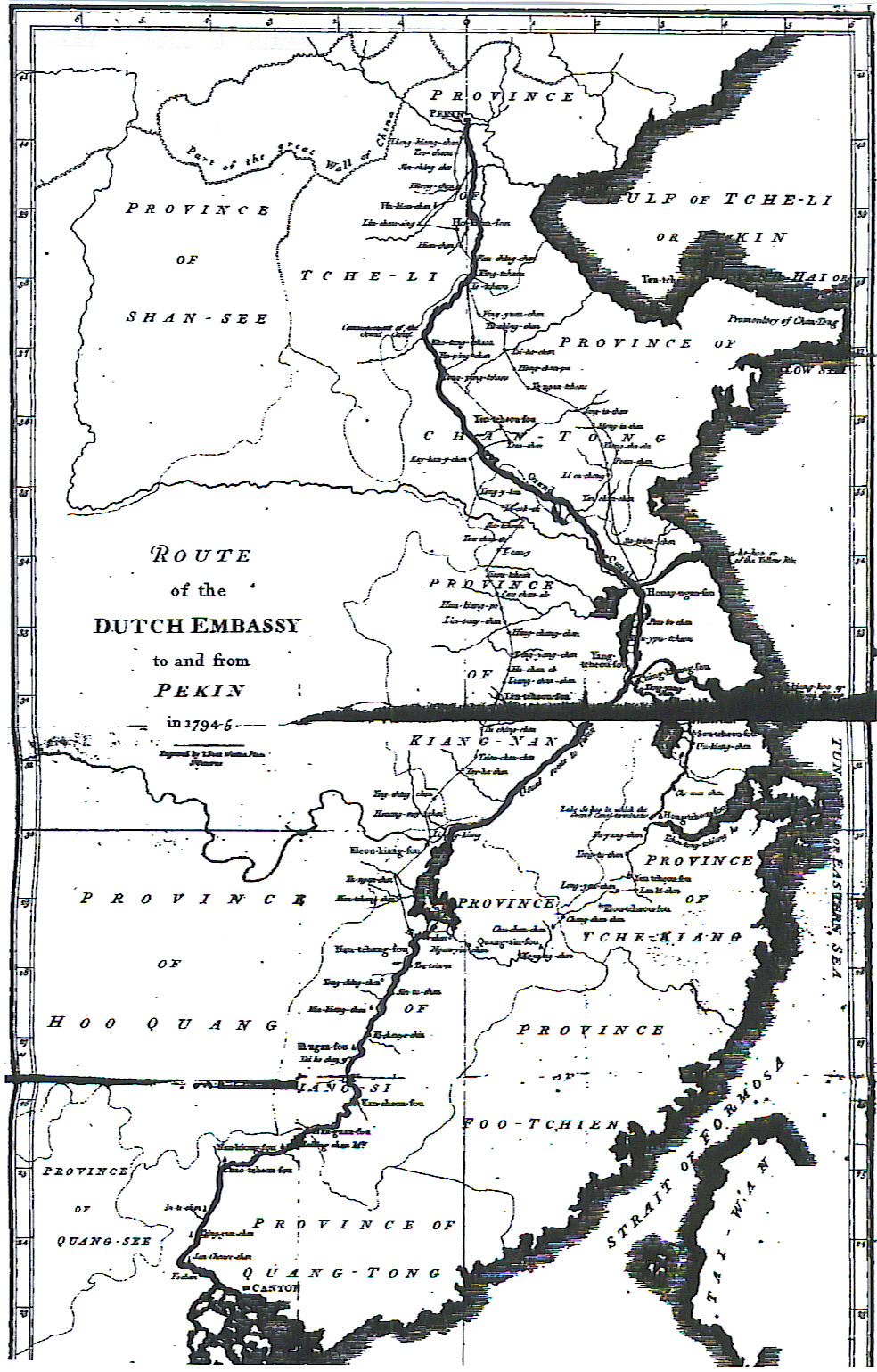
Map showing route of Titsingh diplomatic mission to the Imperial Court in Peking (Beijing), traveling from Canton and returning, 1794–1795.

In November 1794, the embassy, which included van Braam and Chrétien-Louis-Joseph de Guignes (son of Joseph de Guignes) left Guangzhou and it arrived in Beijing in January 1795, just in time for Chinese new year.

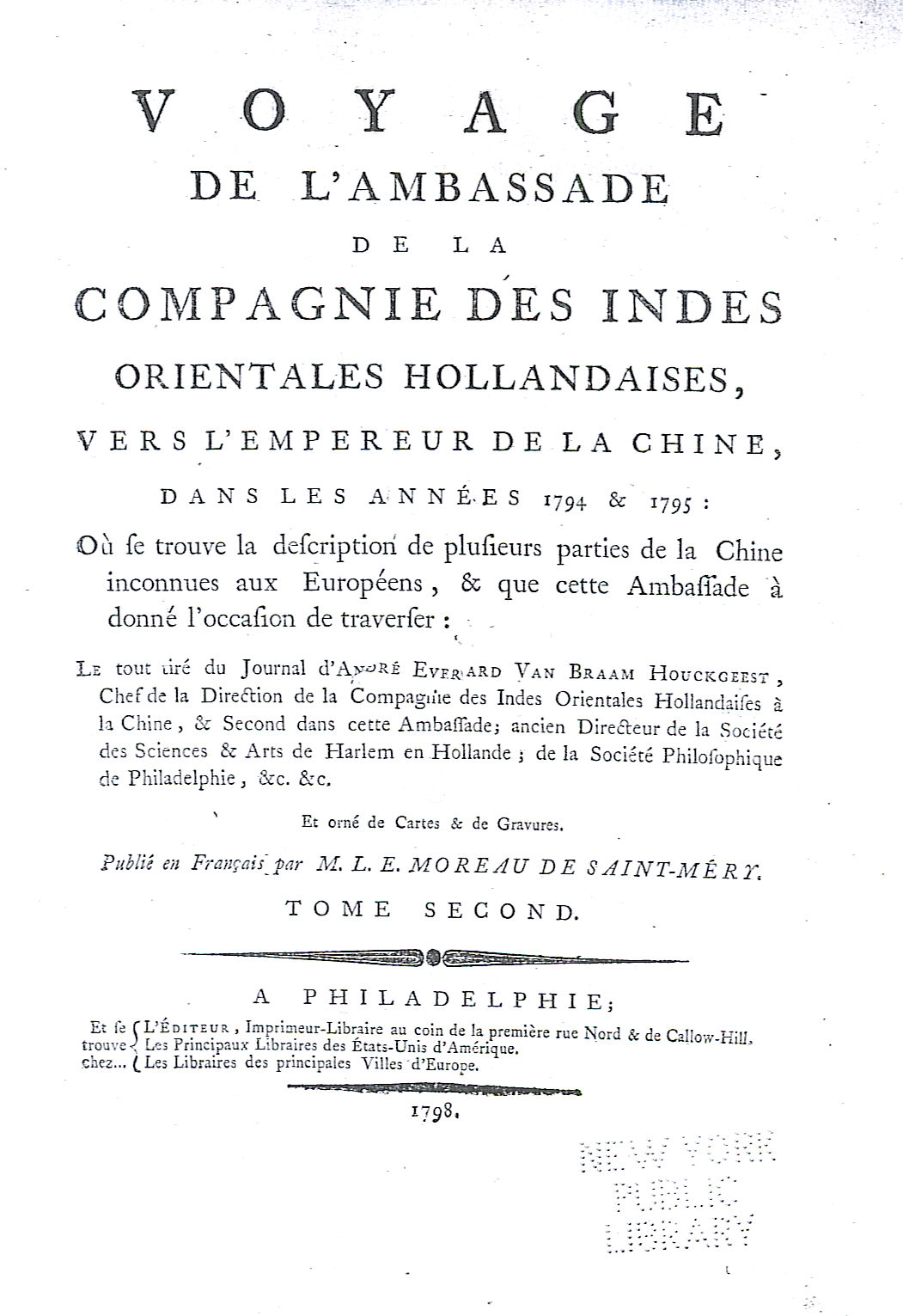
Van Braam's account of the Titsingh mission was initially written in French and published in Philadelphia. This is the title page from the second printing in 1798.

In Beijing, the embassy was received together with representatives of other tributary countries and the members of the embassy performed the kowtow in front of the emperor according to Chinese custom. Van Braam distinguished himself when his hat fell off while bowing, causing the emperor to laugh. Even though he only lived in the US for a short period, Van Braam had retained his US citizenship, and thus became the first US citizen to meet a Chinese emperor. The embassy was lavishly entertained for the remainder of their stay and they were allowed to have additional audiences with the Qianlong emperor at his palace outside Beijing.

== Later life ==
Upon the embassy's return to Guangzhou in March 1795, van Braam was unable to find a ship bound for the Netherlands and chose to board a ship to Philadelphia, US, where he arrived in 1796. Van Braam's arrival in the city attracted a lot of attention and he published an account of his journey, which he dedicated to George Washington. Van Braam decided to stay in the area and settled in Bristol outside the city.

In 1797, van Braam was elected as a member of the American Philosophical Society.

In 1798, he decided to leave the United States for unknown reasons, and after short stays in Germany and England, he bought a small property in Amsterdam, where he died in July 1801.

== Works ==
- van Braam Houckgeest, A.E. (1797). Voyage de l'ambassade de la Compagnie des Indes Orientales hollandaises vers l'empereur de la Chine, dans les années 1794 et 1795. Philadelphia: M.L.E. Moreau de Saint-Méry.
- _______________. (1798). An authentic account of the embassy of the Dutch East-India company, to the court of the emperor of China, in the years 1794 and 1795, Vol. I. London : R. Phillips. [digitized by University of Hong Kong Libraries, Digital Initiatives, "China Through Western Eyes." ]

== See also ==
- Foreign relations of imperial China
