= Kuze Hirotami =

Japanese politician (1737–1800)

Kuze Hirotami (久世広民) (1737–1800), also known as Kuze Tango-no-kami Hirotami (久世丹後守広民), was a Japanese politician during late 18th-century Nagasaki bugyō or governor of Nagasaki port, located on southwestern shore of Kyūshū island in the Japanese archipelago. Kuze was one of the Nagasaki bugyō between 1775 and 1784. His childhood name was Shōkurō (称九郎). His only daughter married Uesugi Yoshinaga.

As Nagasaki bugyō, Kuze was paired with another shogunate official, each alternately exchanging places in Edo and Nagasaki. For example, the diaries maintained by Dutch East Indies Company (VOC) merchants during this period record that as Tsuchiya Morinao (Tsuchiya Suruga-no-kami) is arriving in Nagasaki to take up his duties as Nagasaki bugyō on September 27, 1783, Kuze is preparing to leave en route to Edo; and they both will swap locations the following autumn. The VOC accounts describe Kuze as a good governor.

Kuze is a close relation of one of the Osaka shoshidai in this period, Kuze Hiroakira.

In 1783, Kuze was also one of four Shogunal finance administrators or kanjō-bugyō (勘定奉行), along with Akai Tadamasa, Kurihara Morisada, and Matsumoto Hidemochi. Tanuma Okitsugu was Kuze's patron.

The oldest surviving letter from Kutsuki Masatsuna to Isaac Titsingh dates from 1789; and this letter mentions prominent mutual friends such as Kuze and Shimazu Shigehide, who was the father-in-law of the eleventh Tokugawa shōgun Ienari.

== See also ==
- Bugyō
- Machi-bugyō
- Historiographical Institute of the University of Tokyo
