= Chrétien-Louis-Joseph de Guignes =

French diplomat (1759–1845)

Chrétien-Louis-Joseph de Guignes (French pronunciation: [kʁesjɛ̃ lwi ʒozɛf də ɡiɲ]; 1759–1845) was a French merchant, ambassador and scholar, born in Paris. He was the son of French academician and sinologue, Joseph de Guignes. He learned Chinese from his father, and then traveled to China where he stayed for the next 17 years, returning to France in 1801.

== At court of the Qianlong Emperor ==
In 1794-95, de Guignes served as interpreter for Isaac Titsingh, the Dutch ambassador to the court of the Qianlong Emperor of China.

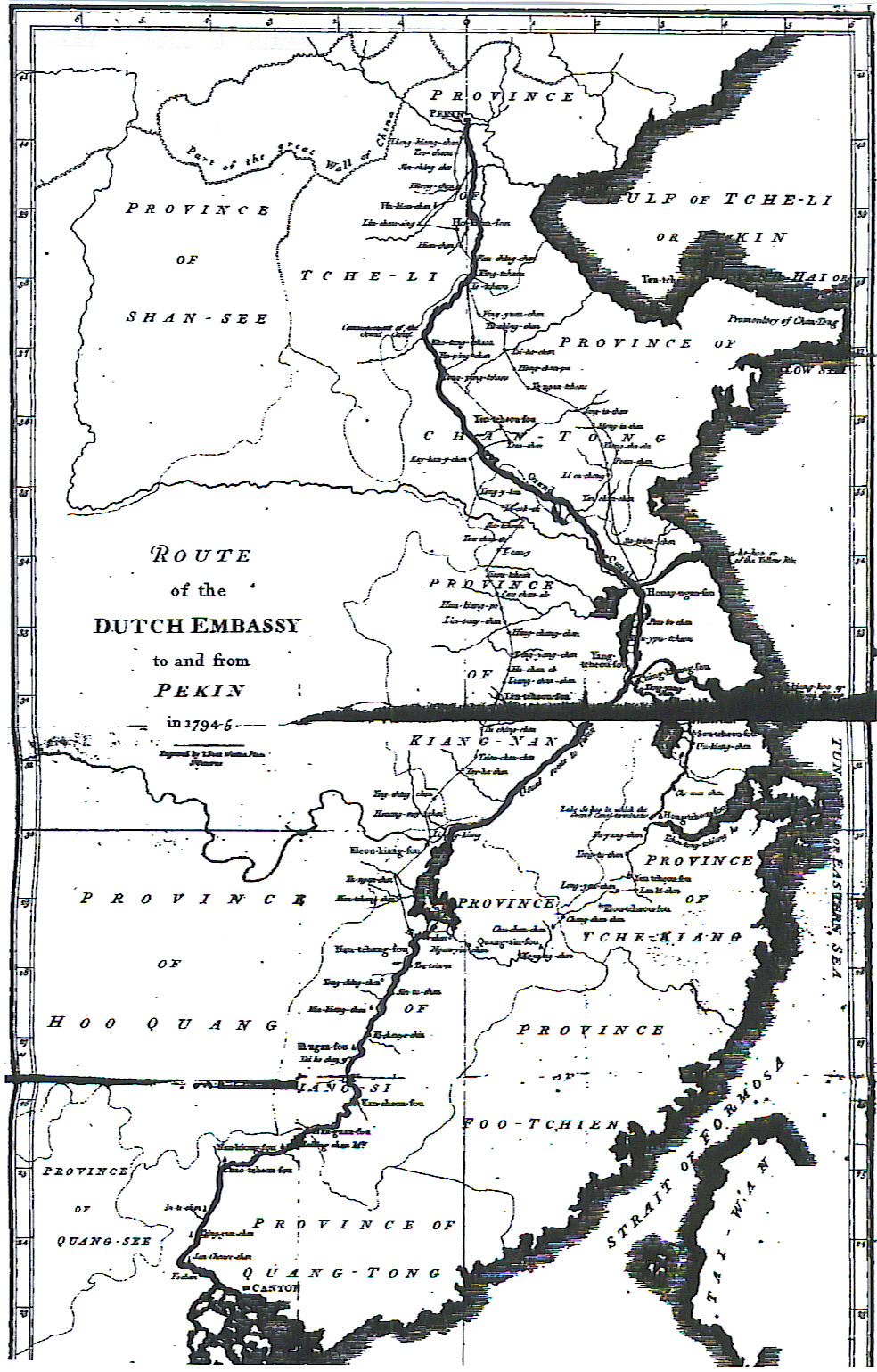
Map showing route of Titsingh diplomatic mission to the Imperial Court in Peikin, traveling from Canton and returning, 1794-1795.

Titsingh travelled to Peking (Beijing) for celebrations of the sixtieth anniversary of the Emperor's reign. The Titsingh delegation also included the Dutch-American Andreas Everardus van Braam Houckgeest, whose description of this embassy to the Chinese court were soon published in the U.S. and Europe. In the year following the emperor's rebuff to the 1793 mission headed by LordGeorge Macartney, Titsingh and his colleagues were much feted by the Chinese because of what was construed as seemly compliance with conventional court etiquette.

In 1808, de Guignes published his account of the Titsingh mission, which provided an alternate perspective and a useful counterpoint to other reports which were then circulating. Neither the Europeans nor the Chinese could have known that the Titsingh embassy would turn out to have been the last occasion in which any European appeared before the Chinese Court within the context of traditional Chinese imperial foreign relations.

== Sinologist ==
In 1808, Napoleon ordered de Guignes to prepare a Chinese-French-Latin dictionary. The work was completed five years later. Shortly after the publication, it was discovered that the dictionary was nothing more than a copy of an older work composed by the Franciscan friar, Basilio Brollo of Gemona (1648–1704). While de Guignes had altered the original by arranging the characters according to the order of the 214 radicals (as contrasted with Basilio's tone-based order), the dictionary received strong criticism in 1814 from the first person to be appointed to be a professor of Chinese at a European institution of higher learning, Jean-Pierre Abel-Rémusat (1788–1832). Despite the controversy, de Guignes was elected a member of the Institut de France in the Académie des Sciences (Géographie et Navigation) and of the Académie des Inscriptions et Belles-Lettres.

Guignes was also the author of a work of travels (Voyages a Pékin, Manille, et l'île de France, 1808).

== Works ==
- de Guignes, C.-L.-J. (1813). Dictionnaire Chinois, Français et Latin, le Vocabulaire Chinois Latin. Paris: Imprimerie Impériale.
- Chrétien-Louis-Joseph de Guignes (1808). Voyage a Pékin, Manille et l'Ile de France. Paris: Imprimerie Impériale.. v.1, v.2, v.3, v.4 (atlas)
