= Wilhelm Heinrich Ackermann =

German teacher (1789–1848)

Wilhelm Heinrich Ackermann (25 June 1789, Auerbach, Saxony – 27 March 1848, Frankfurt) was a German teacher.

His father was higher priest in Auerbach, his two brothers worked as councillor in Dresden and as priest in Syrau. Wilhelm Ackermann learned on the college of Gotha, then beginning in 1807 studied theology in Leipzig. During his studies, he began teaching and found his vocation therein.

Asked by his uncle Rudolph Ackermann, a merchant from London, he began in 1811 to teach young Englishmen with whom he stayed for two years with the Swiss pedagogue Johann Heinrich Pestalozzi in Yverdon-les-Bains. Ackermann said he was learning daily from the ingenious old man, so plenty of inspirations.

In 1813 he entered the Freikorps of baron Ludwig Adolf Wilhelm von Lützow in an enthusiasm to free his fatherland. He served as rifleman and became officer on 26 August. On the same day Karl Theodor Körner fell. Ackermann and other officers dug the grave of their friend under an oak in Wöbbelin. During the Battle of the Göhrde, he captured a cannon and received the Iron cross of honour. He accompanied the corps until Paris.

After the peace treaty of 1814, Ackermann went to London where he worked as correspondent for the companies of his uncle. In winter, he travelled to Germany, where he visited the house of Theodor Körner. In London, he kept company with the teacher of elocution Alexander Graham Bell, whose rather passive teaching system contrasted with the tenets of Pestalozzi followed by Ackermann. Beginning in 1815, he travelled again to Ifferten with five pupils, and Dr. Bell followed soon. All attempts to convince Dr. Bell from the side of Pestalozzi and Ackermann remained fruitless. In the following years, Ackermann travels with his pupils or stays at friendly institutes.

In 1819, he reaches Frankfurt, where he accepts a regular teaching position at the Musterschule (4 July 1820), where he preferred to teach history and German. While there, he stood up for religious and political freedom, restricted by the resolutions of 28 June 1823. He remained in office until the end of the year 1847, when he retired with chest troubles.

Ackermann never married.

== Publications ==
- Erinnerungen aus meinem Leben bei Pestalozzi
- Erinnerungen aus den Freiheitskriegen

== Sources ==
- Allgemeine Deutsche Biographie - online version at Wikisource
