= Kutsuki Masatsuna =

Daimyo

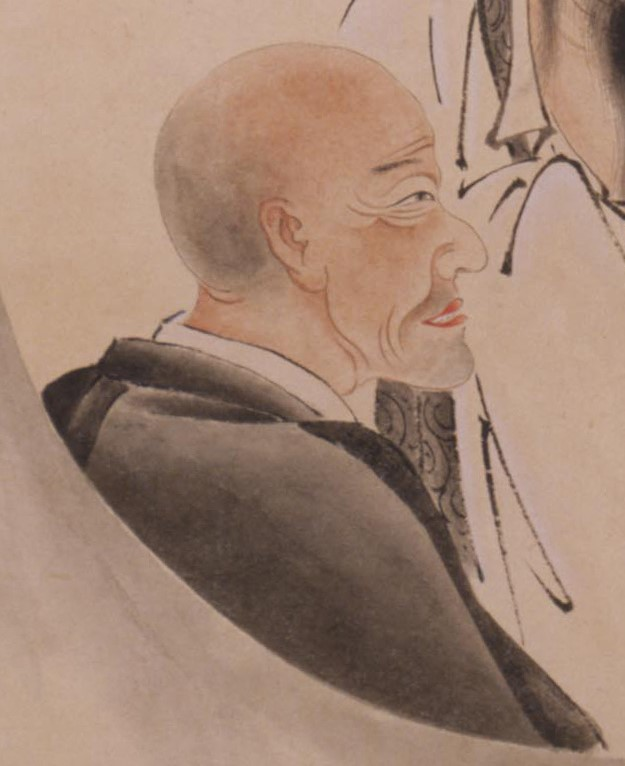
Kutsuki Masatsuna

Kutsuki Masatsuna (朽木 昌綱; March 5, 1750 – May 18, 1802), also known as Kutsuki Oki-no kami Minamoto-no Masatsuna, was a Japanese daimyō of the Fukuchiyama Domain and a scholar of numismatics and Dutch studies (rangaku).

His childhood name was Tomojiro (斧次郎). Kutsuki was hereditary daimyō of Oki and Ōmi with holdings in Tanba and Fukuchiyama. His warrior clan was amongst the hereditary vassals of the Tokugawa family (the fudai) in the Edo period.

== Scholarship ==
Kutsuki was a polymath and a keen student of whatever information was available at that time concerning the West. Since most printed material was only available in the Dutch language, such studies were commonly called "Dutch learning" (rangaku).

He studied rangaku with the physician Maeno Ryotaku, and associated with the Dutch during their visits to Edo as well as with the interpreters at Nagasaki.

The Dutch trade official and japanologist Isaac Titsingh considered Kutsuki to have been his closest friend while he was in Japan, and their correspondence continued after Titsingh left Dejima for the last time. The oldest surviving letter from Kutsuki to Titsingh dates from 1789; and this letter mentions mutual friends such as Shimazu Shigehide (the father-in-law of the eleventh shōgun, Tokugawa Ienari) and Kuze Hirotami (Nagasaki bugyō or governor of Nagasaki port). Later Titsingh sent him Nicolas Sanson's world atlas (with the Netherlands circled in red ink), upon which Kutsuki based his studies of European geography.

Kutsuki and Titsingh shared an interest in numismatics. After Titsingh was reassigned from Japan in 1784, he sent packages of coins from India—Dutch coppers, as well as coins from India, Russia, Turkey, and Africa. Titsingh in turn received Japanese and Chinese coins as gifts. Kutsuki was an author of several treatises on numismatics, and was the first in Japan to circulate a book about non-Japanese coins with impressions taken from actual coins which had been obtained from Western traders. His collection of coins was brought to the UK in the 19th century, and is now in the British Museum and the Ashmolean Museum.

== Family ==
- Father: Kutsuki Tsunasada (1713–1788)
- Foster Father: Kutsuki Nobutsuna (1731–1787)
- Wives:
  - Ikumanhime, Matsudaira Munenobu's daughter
  - Honda Sukemitsu's daughter
  - Ito Nagatoshi's daughter
- Children:
  - Yuunosuke
  - Kutsuki Tsunakata (1787–1838), adopted by Tomotsuna
  - Yonekura Masanaga
  - Fukuju Taro
- Adopted Son: Katsuki Tomotsuna (1767–1803)

== Events of the daimyō's life ==
- 1781 (Tenmei 1): This numismatist scholar's book, Shinzen zenpu ("Newly selected manual of numismatics"), was published.
- 1782 (Tenmei 2): This numismatist scholar's analysis of copper currency in China and Japan "Shinzen zenpu" was presented to the emperor.
- 1785 (Tenmei 5): This numismatist scholar's book, Kaisei kōhō zukan ("Corrected Illustrated mirror of coinage"), was published.
- 1785 (Tenmei 5): Masatsuna inherited his father's position and titles.
- 1787 (Tenmei 7): This rangaku/numismatist scholar's book, Seiyō senpu (Notes on Western Coinage), with plates showing European and colonial currency, was completed. -- see online image of 2 adjacent pages from library collection of Kyoto University of Foreign Studies and Kyoto Junior College of Foreign Languages
- 1789 (Kansei 1): This rangaku/geographer scholar's book, Taisei yochi zusetsu ("Illustrated explanation of Western geography"), was published.
- 1800 (Kansei 11): Masatsuna retires, handing over his position and titles to his son, Mototsuna.
- 1801 (Kansei 12): Mototsuna predeceased his father, and Masatsuna's grandson, Tsunagata becomes daimyō.
- 1802 (Kansei 13): Masatsuna dies.
- 1807 (Bunka 4): Isaac Titsingh sends his last letter to Masatsuna from Europe, not knowing that his old friend had died some years earlier. Titsingh's decided to dedicate his translation of Nihon Ōdai Ichiran to Masatsuna.

== Selected work ==
Kutsuki's published writings encompass 8 works in 12 publications in 1 language and 25 library holdings.

- 1781 -- Newly selected manual of numismatics (Shinzen zenpu)
- 1785 -- Corrected Illustrated mirror of coinage (改正孔方圖鑑, Kaisei kōhō zukan); note that only one copy known to exist.
- 1787 -- Notes on Western Coinage (西洋銭譜, Seiyō zenpu; OCLC 249942145), also romanized as Seiyō senpu
- 1789 -- Illustrated Explanation of Western Geography (泰西輿地図說, Taisei yochi zusetsu; OCLC 440015493).
- 1790 — Former and Present Coin Appraisal (古今泉貨鑑, Kokon senka kagami; OCLC 050737460)
