= Ackermann's Repository =

Illustrated British periodical

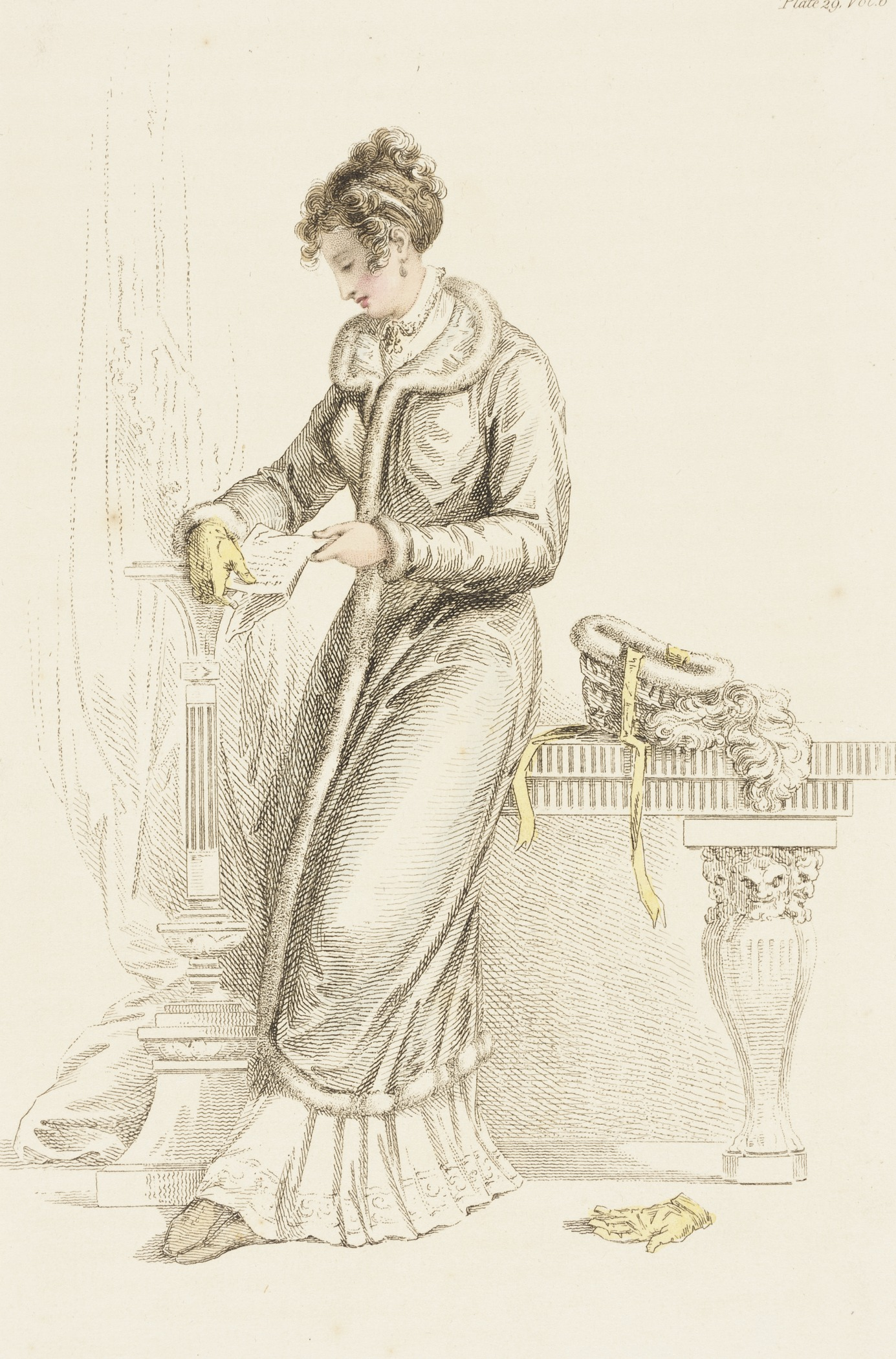
A fashion plate from the November 1811 issue

Ackermann's Repository of Arts was an illustrated British periodical published from 1809 to 1829 by Rudolph Ackermann. Although commonly called Ackermann's Repository, or, simply Ackermann's, the formal title of the journal was Repository of arts, literature, commerce, manufactures, fashions, and politics, and it did indeed cover all of these fields. In its day, it had great influence on English taste in fashion, architecture, and literature. Ackermann employed Frederic Shoberl from the third issue in 1809 to 1828 when Shoberl moved on to similar projects.

The last issue of the original Repository, published in December 1828, stated that the following year a new magazine would take its place. This new magazine, titled The Repository of Fashion, focused solely on fashion and was illustrated with a number of hand-colored and black-and-white plates. However, the last known issue of this new periodical was in September 1829. It is believed that The Repository of Fashion was merged into La Belle Assemblée soon thereafter.
