= Frank Lequin =

Frank Lequin (born 1946) is a Dutch historian, academic, editor and author. He is best known as an expert on the Dutch East Indies Company and Isaac Titsingh.

== Early life ==
Lequin was born in Rotterdam in 1946. He was awarded a Ph.D. from the University of Leiden in 1982.

== Career ==
In 1976, he founded the Titsingh Institute for research.

== Selected works ==
- (in Dutch) (2013). Varia Titsinghiana. Addenda & corrigenda. Leiden. (Titsingh Studies, vol. 6) ISBN 978-90-820366-0-2
- (in Dutch) (2011) Isaac Titsingh, opperhoofd van Japan. Drie geschriften als filosoof, diplomaat & koopman. Alphen aan den Rijn. (Titsingh Studies, vol. 5) ISBN 978-90-6469-858-3
- (in Dutch) (2009) De particuliere correspondentie van Isaac Titsingh (1783-1812). Alphen aan den Rijn. 2 vols. (Titsingh Studies, vol. 4) ISBN 978-90-6469-846-0
- (in Dutch) (2005) Isaac Titsingh in China (1794-1796). Alphen aan den Rijn. (Titsingh Studies, vol. 3) ISBN 90-6469-809-0
- (2003) À la recherche du Cabinet Titsingh. Its history, contents and dispersal. Catalogue raisonné of the collection of the founder of European Japanology. Alphen aan den Rijn. (Titsingh Studies, vol. 2) ISBN 90-6469-794-9
- (in Dutch) (2002). Isaac Titsingh (1745-1812). Een passie voor Japan, leven en werk van de grondlegger van de Europese Japanologie. Leiden. (Titsingh Studies, vol. 1) ISBN 90-6469-771-X
- (1990–92). The Private Correspondence of Isaac Titsingh. Amsterdam. (Japonica Neerlandica, vol. 4-5). 2 vols. ISBN 978-90-5063-052-8 (volume 1) ISBN 978-90-5063-057-3 (volume 2)
- (in Dutch) (1989) Samuel van de Putte, een mandarijn uit Vlissingen (1690-1745). De onbedoelde publicatie van een restant.
- (in Dutch) (1982) Het personeel van de Verenigde Oost-Indische Compagnie in Azie in de achttiende eeuw, meer in het bijzonder in de vestiging Bengalen.
