= Isaac Titsingh =

Dutch diplomat, scholar, and merchant

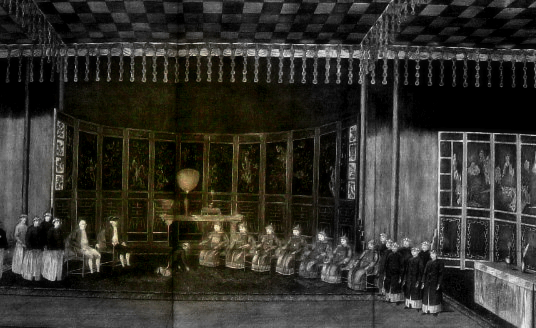
Illustration depicting the last European delegation to be received at the Qianlong Emperor's court in 1795. Isaac Titsingh seated on the far left of the picture (wearing a hat) and Andreas Everardus van Braam Houckgeest seated to his right.

Isaac Titsingh FRS (c. January 1745 – 2 February 1812) was a Dutch diplomat, historian, Japanologist, and merchant. During a long career in East Asia, Titsingh was a senior official of the Dutch East India Company (Dutch: Vereenigde Oostindische Compagnie (VOC)). He represented the European trading company in exclusive official contact with Tokugawa Japan, traveling to Edo twice for audiences with the shogun and other high officials of the shogunate. He was the Dutch and VOC governor general in Chinsura, Bengal.

Titsingh worked with his counterpart, Charles Cornwallis, who was governor general of the British East India Company. In 1795, Titsingh represented Dutch and VOC interests in China, where his reception at the court of the Qing Qianlong Emperor stood in contrast to the rebuff suffered by British diplomat George Macartney's mission in 1793, just prior to celebrations of Qianlong's sixty-year reign. In China, Titsingh effectively functioned as ambassador for his country at the same time as he represented the Dutch East India Company as a trade representative.

== Life and career ==
=== Early life ===
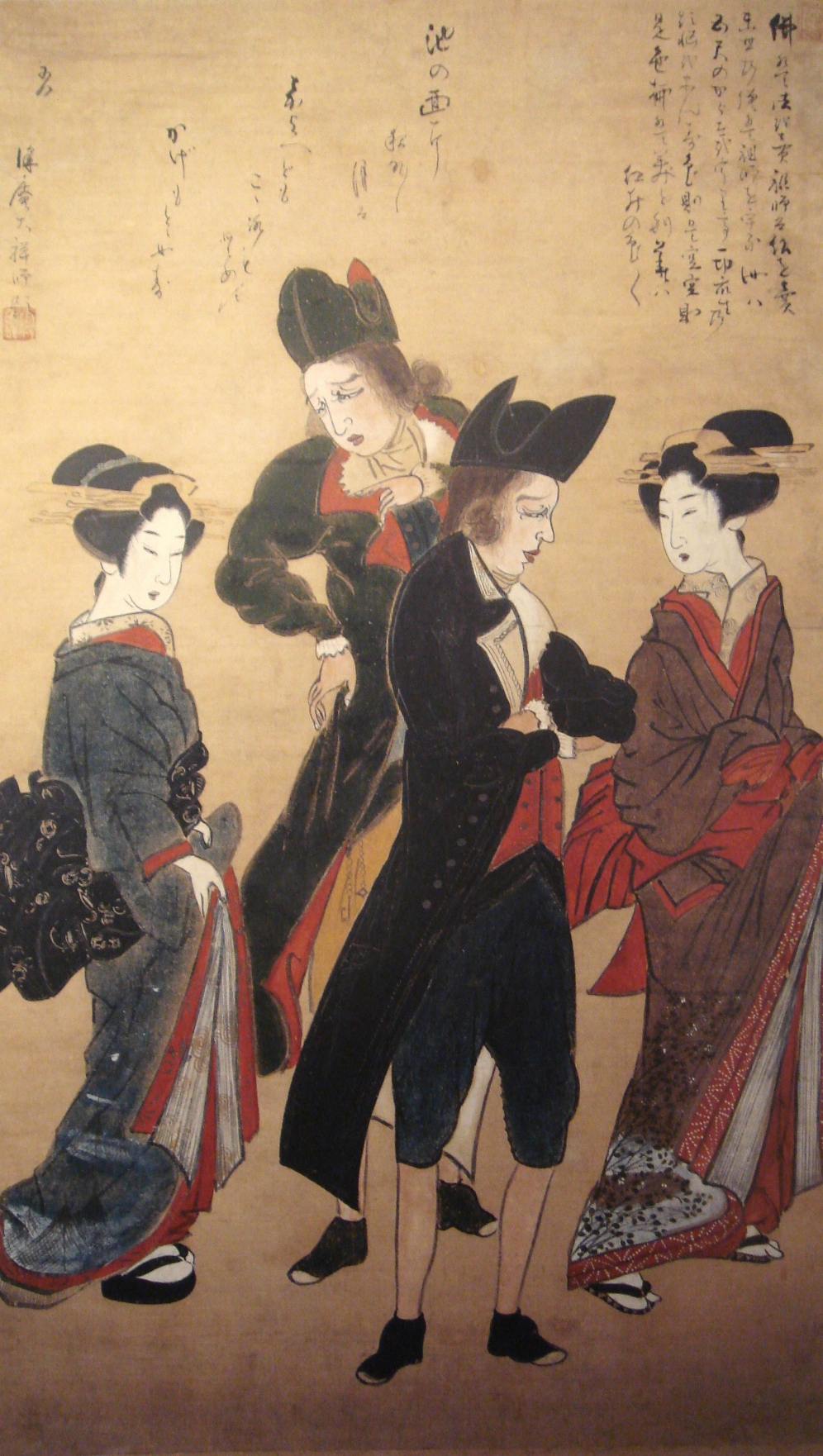
Dutchmen with Courtesans in Nagasaki c. 1800

Isaac Titsingh was born in Amsterdam, the son of Albertus Titsingh and his second wife, Catharina Bittner. His baptism took place at the Amstelkerk in Amsterdam on 21 January 1745. His father was a successful and prominent Amsterdam surgeon. He thus possessed the means for Titsingh to be brought up with an "enlightened education" of the 18th century. Titsingh became a member of the Amsterdam Chirurgijngilde (English: Barber surgeon's guild) and received the degree of a Doctorate of Law from Leiden University in January 1765. In March 1764, Titsingh was appointed as a freeman and 1766 went within his employment to Batavia, now Jakarta.

=== Japan, 1779–1784 ===
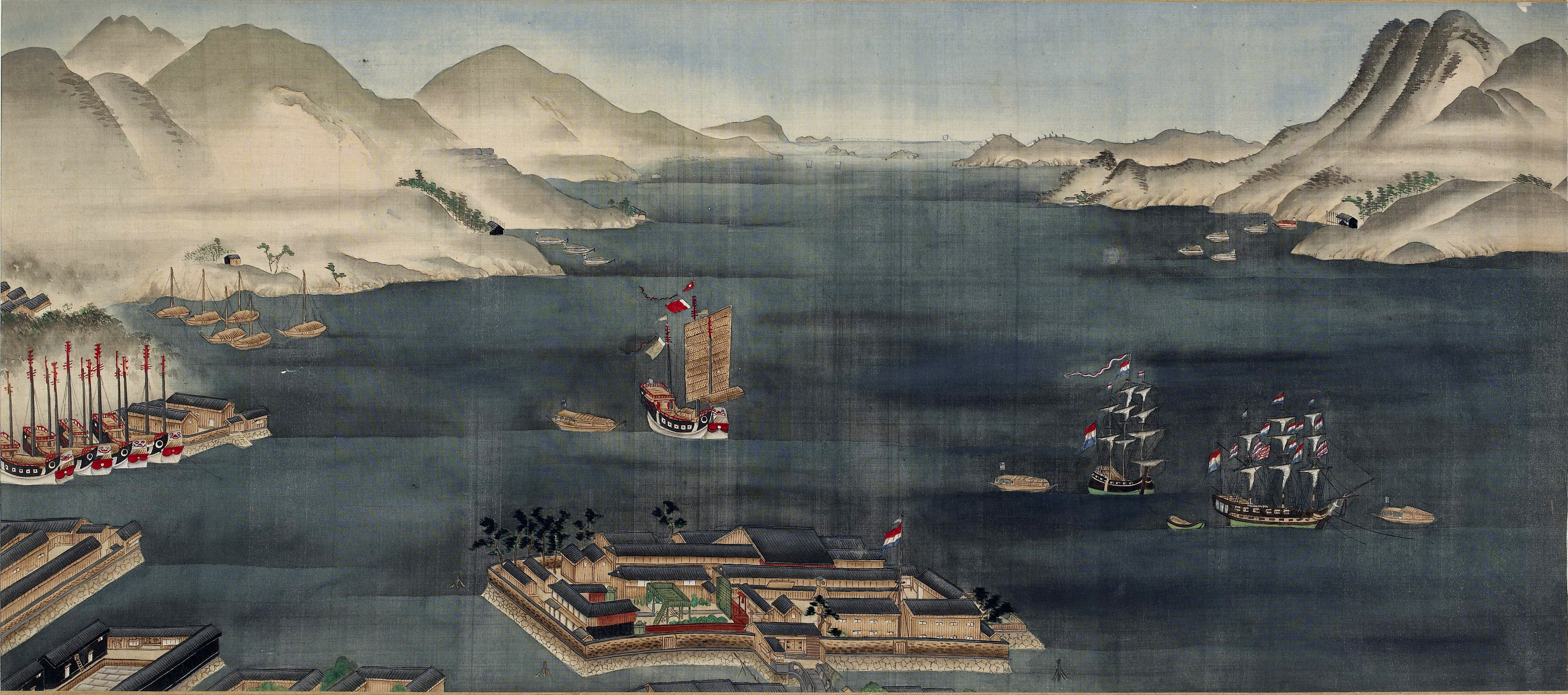
Dejima and Nagasaki Bay, circa 1820. Two Dutch ships and numerous Chinese trading junks are depicted.

Titsingh was the commercial opperhoofd, or chief factor, in Japan from 1779 to 1780, from 1781 to 1783, and again in 1784. The singular importance of the head of the VOC in Japan during this period was enhanced by the Japanese policy of Sakoku, the self-imposed isolation of Japan that lasted from 1633 to 1853. Because of religious proselytizing by Europeans during the 16th century, the Tokugawa shogunate introduced a policy in the early 17th century that no European or Japanese could enter or leave the Japanese archipelago on penalty of death. The sole exception to this "closed door" was the VOC "factory" (trading post) on the island of Dejima in Nagasaki Bay, on the southern Japanese island of Kyūshū. During this period of seclusion, Titsingh is believed to have been the first Freemason in Japan.

In this highly controlled context, the traders became the sole official conduit for trade and for scientific-cultural exchanges between Europe and Japan. The VOC opperhoofd was accorded the status of a tributary of the shogun; Titsingh twice had to pay an obligatory annual visit of homage to the shogun in Edo. Given the scarcity of such opportunities, Titsingh's informal contacts with bakufu officials of Rangaku scholars in Edo may have been as important as his formal audiences with the shogun, Tokugawa Ieharu.

During the 18th century, there was an improvement of the social position of the Dutch merchants and the treatment of the Dutch vis-à-vis the Japanese, who showed a higher degree of respect and recognition than in the centuries before. Nevertheless, the average opperhoofd was not interested in the customs or culture of the Japanese. Titsingh showed an almost incredible interest and distinguished himself as an attentive observer of Japanese civilization for a European of his time when compared to his colleagues in Dejima. Titsingh arrived in Nagasaki on 15 August 1779, where he took over the factory from Arend Willem Feith. He established cordial and amicable relations between the interpreters and Japanese; before his arrival there had been constant fights over trade issues and a deep hostility towards the Japanese interpreter, who seemed in trade issues corrupt to the Dutch traders. During his first audience with Ieharu in Edo from 25 March 1780 until 5 April 1780, he met a lot of Japanese daimyo with whom he later established vivid letter correspondence. He became incredibly prominent within the elite society of Edo and became friends with several current and retired daimyo of the area.

After a short return to Batavia in 1780, Titsingh returned to Nagasaki on 12 August 1781, due to his successes with the Dutch–Japanese trade in Dejima. There were no Dutch shipments from Batavia in 1782 due to the Fourth Anglo-Dutch War, and thus the trading post in Dejima was cut off from communication with Java during this year. In that year, Titsingh stayed in his position as opperhoofd and concerned himself with befriending Japanese scholars, deepening relations with Japanese friends and researching all scopes of Japanese customs and culture. He also achieved, due to the absence of Dutch shipping that year, important trade talks and great concessions with the Japanese on a long-debated increase to copper exports from Japan to the Dutch traders.

Titsingh stayed a total of three years and eight months in Japan before finally leaving Nagasaki at the end of November 1784 to return to Batavia, where he arrived on 3 January 1785.

=== India, 1785–1792 ===
In 1785, Titsingh was appointed director of the trading post at Chinsurah in Bengal. Titsingh was described by William Jones, the philologist and Bengal jurist, as "the Mandarin of Chinsura".

=== Batavia, 1792–1793 ===
Titsingh's return to Batavia led to new positions as Ontvanger-Generaal (Treasurer) and later as Commissaris ter Zee (Maritime Commissioner).

While at Batavia, he met with George Macartney who was en route to China. Titsingh's comments were important factors in McCartney's decision to abandon a planned expedition to Japan in 1793. Mccartney's report to London explained:

"... the expediency of attempting an intercourse with the Japanese subsists in its full force. Tho from the conversations I had at Batavia with a Dutch Gentleman of a very liberal disposition who was several years resident in Japan, Isaac Titsingh, I collected nothing that could induce me to depend on a favorable reception there, I learned nothing to deter me from the trial. The risk would, at least, be personal, as we have hitherto there no trade to lose. And no moment, if any, could be so propitious for opening up a new trade with them, as when, from the present general confusion of affairs of the Dutch East India Company, their connection with the Japanese is greatly on the decline."

=== China, 1794–1795 ===
Titsingh was appointed Dutch ambassador to the court of the emperor of China for the celebrations of the sixtieth anniversary of the reign of the Qianlong Emperor. In Peking (now Beijing), the Titsingh delegation included Andreas Everardus van Braam Houckgeest and Chrétien-Louis-Joseph de Guignes, whose complementary accounts of this embassy to the Chinese court were published in the US and Europe.

Titsingh's gruelling, mid-winter trek from Canton (now Guangzhou) to Peking allowed him to see parts of inland China which had never before been accessible to Europeans. His party arrived in Peking in time for New Year's celebrations. By Chinese standards, Titsingh and his delegation were received with uncommon respect and honors in the Forbidden City, and later in the Yuanmingyuan (the Old Summer Palace).

Titsingh is believed to have been the first Freemason in China, and the only to be received at the court of the Qianlong Emperor.

=== Return to Europe, 1796–1812 ===
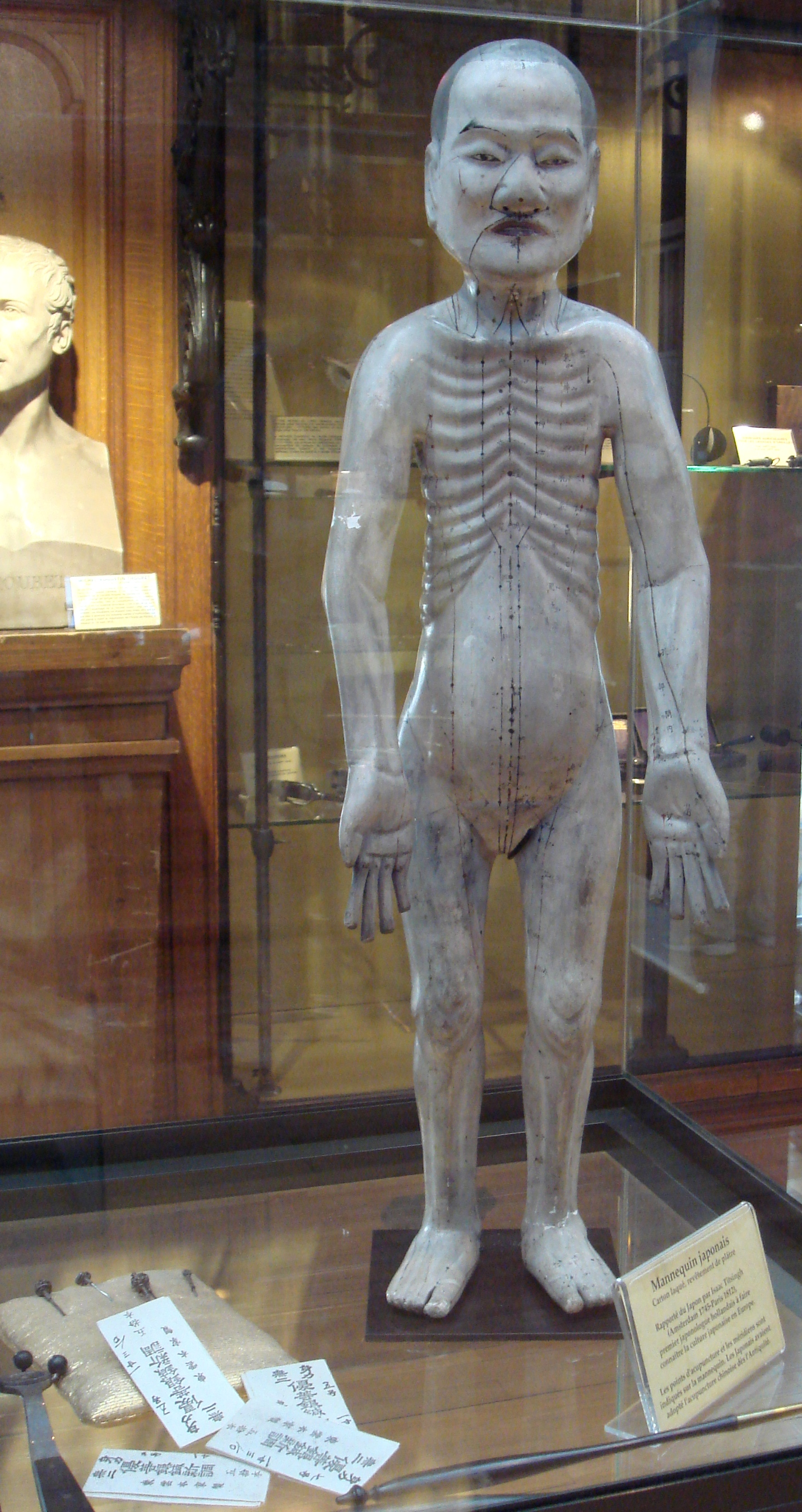
Japanese acupuncture mannequin from the Titsingh estate. Musée d'histoire de la médecine, Paris.

On 1 March 1796, the Dutch East India Company, already in decline, was nationalized by the new Batavian Republic. In that year, Titsingh returned to Europe. For some time, he lived in Britain, at London and Bath, and was a member of the Royal Society. In 1801, he went back to Amsterdam, and thence to Paris, where he lived until his death.

Titsingh died in Paris on 2 February 1812, and is buried in Père Lachaise Cemetery. His gravestone reads: "Ici repose Isaac Titsingh. Ancien conseiller des Indes hollandaises. Ambassadeur à la Chine et au Japon. Mort à Paris le 2 février 1812, agé de 68 ans." [Here lies Isaac Titsingh, formerly a councillor of the Dutch East India Company, Ambassador to China and to Japan. Died at Paris the 2nd of February 1812, aged 68 years.]

=== Family ===
Titsingh had a son, Willem, born about 1790 of Titsingh's Bengali mistress. He took his son to Europe in 1800 so that he could be recognised as legitimate. When Titsingh moved to Paris, Willem went with him and attended the French Maritime Academy, graduating in 1810.

== Library and collections ==
Titsingh's library and his collection of art, cultural and scientific material were dispersed; some entered the collections of the French state. Among the Japanese books brought to Europe by Titsingh was a copy of Sangoku Tsūran Zusetsu (三国通覧図説, An Illustrated Description of Three Countries) by Hayashi Shihei (1738–93). This book, which was published in Japan in 1785, deals with Joseon (now Korea), the Ryukyu Kingdom (now Okinawa), and Ezo (now Hokkaido). In Paris, the text represented the first appearance of Hangul, the Korean writing system, in Europe. After Titsingh's death, the printed original and Titsingh's translation were purchased by Jean-Pierre Abel-Rémusat (1788–1832) at the Collège de France. After Rémusat's death, Julius Klaproth (1783–1835) at the Institut Royal in Paris was free in 1832 to publish his edited version of Titsingh's translation.

== Legacy ==
Isaac Titsingh can be described as being the only philosopher employed by the VOC in its almost two hundred years existence and the most sophisticated of all VOC employees in the trading post history of the VOC in Japan (1600–1853). Due to his extensive private correspondence on religious as well as human topics and his endeavours in the exchanges between the outside world and his own, he can be considered as a true philosopher of the 18th century. Compared to the other VOC employees he was a polyglot, who spoke eight languages (Dutch, Latin, French, English, German, Portuguese, Japanese and Chinese). His enthusiasm to introduce the European society to Japanese customs and culture was rooted in his overall passion for Japan and everything Japanese. Therefore, he became a prominent figure, transmitter and interpreter in a two-way cultural, learning and knowledge exchange between the Japanese and the Europeans. For example, he imported Dutch books on European knowledge to Japan. In addition, he collected authentic source materials on Japan, which consisted of the first ever European collection on Japan, entailing printed books, manuscripts, prints, maps, city plans and coins. This collection was thus to form the basis of a then unique history of Japan. This Cabinet Titsingh consisted hence of two-dimensional materials. Isaac Titsingh can, as a result, be seen as the founder of European Japonology. Within this scope and his ambitions for a friendly exchange of knowledge, he urged the VOC officials to send learned employees, who could speak Japanese to the trading post in Dejima, to better the European–Japanese relations in Dejima, which can be found in his letter of 28 August 1785.

Titsingh had also translated—as one of the first Europeans—Japanese verses into Latin verses, which can be found together with an essay on Japanese poetry in his collection of work on Japanese customs and culture in Bijzonderheden over Japan/Illustrations of Japan.

Because of his position as a "voyageur philosophique", Titsingh had been a member of the following societies: the Bataviaasch Genootschap van Kunsten en Wetenschappen, the Hollandsche Maatschappij der Wetenschappen, located in Haarlem, the Asiatic Society of Bengal located in Calcutta and the Royal Society of London.

His posthumous work and legacy, especially his collections, were to some extent blurred later as he was unable to find Japanese or Chinese translators and scholars in Europe that could help him with the translation of his gathered sources. As his own knowledge of the Sino-Japanese written characters was limited, he could only edit the translations of the Japanese accounts that were already prepared by himself and others in Dejima during his stay abroad. The majority of his work thus was published posthumously and consisted of only small parts of his broader overall work. Moreover, some parts were altered and modified to a great extent by his editors and publishers. This was due to the fact that after the bankruptcy of Titsingh's son Willem, Titsingh sold the collections and manuscripts, which then were spread all over 19th century Europe.

Titsingh's experiences and scholarly research were the genesis for published articles and books. The Batavian Academy of Arts and Sciences (Bataviaasch Genootschap van Kunsten en Wetenschappen) published seven of Titsingh's articles about Japan.

His accounts of brewing sake and soy sauce production in Japan were the earliest to be published in a Western language. His work was more widely disseminated throughout Europe by the beginning of the 19th century.

Titsingh's published compilation of a preliminary Japanese lexicon was only the early evidence of a project which continued for the rest of his life.

== On Isaac Titsingh's values and perceptions ==
Titsingh was very keen on having his scholarly questions answered and showed an enormous inexhaustible thirst for knowledge. Looking at his private correspondence three mottos of his behaviour and values can be identified: the rejection of money, as it did not satisfy his enormous thirst of knowledge; an acknowledgment and consciousness of the brevity of life and wasting this precious time not with featureless activities; and his desire to die in calmness, as a "forgotten citizen of the world". In this light he displayed the values of a European philosopher of the 18th century, who was as well interested in his fellow Japanese scholars. Therefore, he also acknowledged their intellectual competences and sophistication and contributed to an intense exchange of cultural knowledge between Japan and Europe in the 18th century.

== Selected works ==
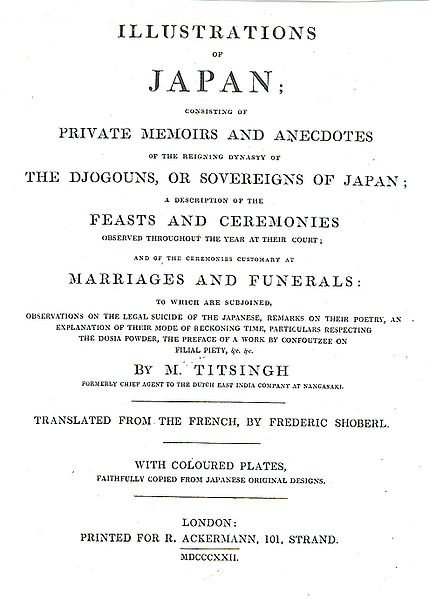
Titsingh's text attempts to present the Japanese in the context of their own narratives. This title page is from the 1822 English version of the French original which was published two years earlier.

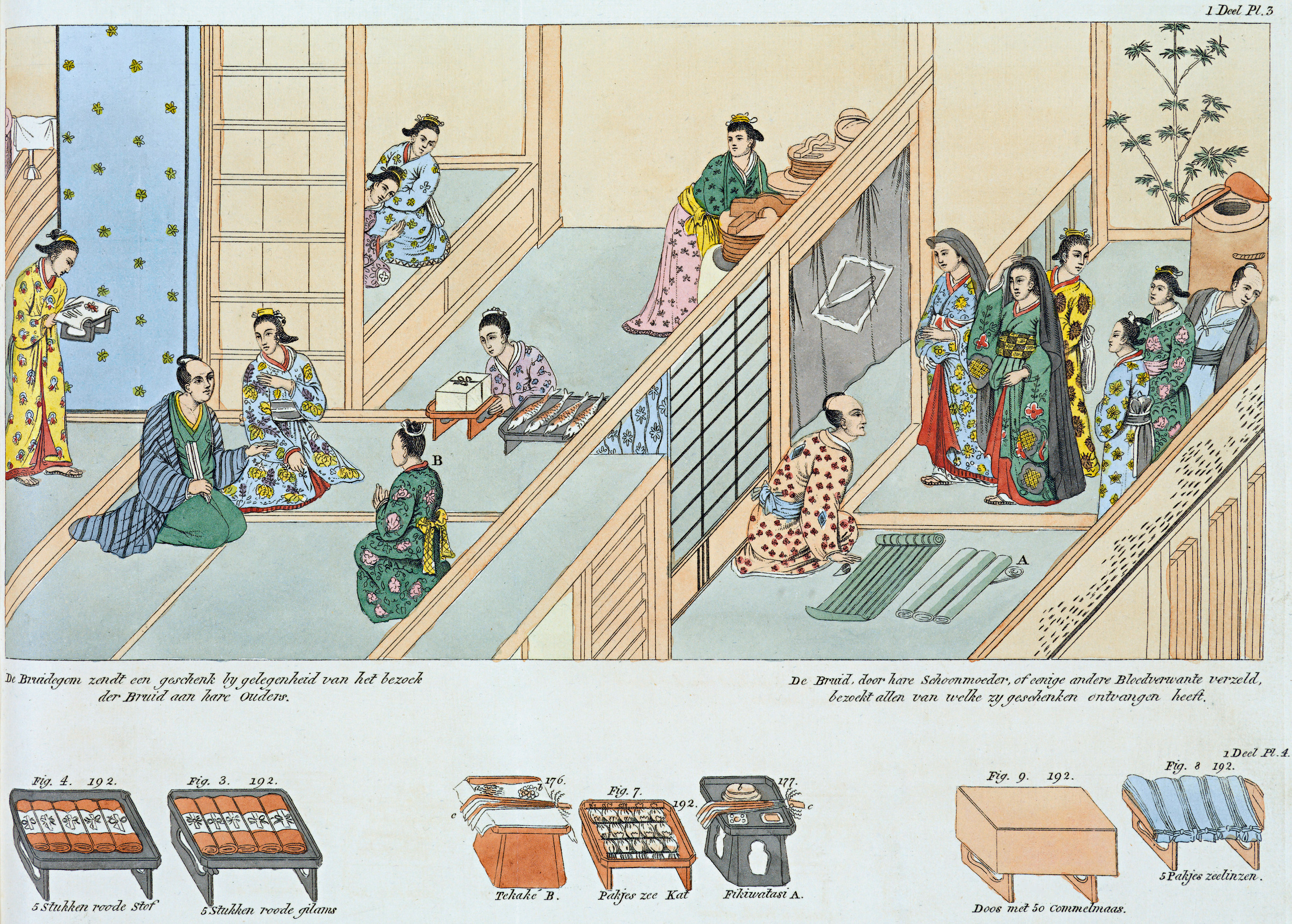
Element of a wedding ceremony

In a statistical overview derived from writings by and about Seki Takakau, OCLC/WorldCat encompasses roughly 90+ works in 150+ publications in 7 languages and 1,600+ library holdings.

- 1781 – "Bereiding van saké en soya", in Verhandelingen van het Bataviaasch genootschap van Kunsten en Wetenschappen (Transactions of the Batavian society of arts and sciences), Vol. III, Batavia.
- 1814 – "Ieso-Ki, ou Description d'Yeso, par Arai-Tsi-kogo-no-Kami, Instituteur du Ziogoen (empereur militaire) Tsoena-Josi, écrite en 1720. Ieso-Ki ou Description d'Yeso, avec l'histoire de la révolte de Sam-say-In, par Kannamon, interprète japonais, écrite en 1752. Notice de deux cartes japonais, manuscrites, communiquées par M. Titsingh," in Annales des voyages, Vol. XXIV, Paris.
- 1819 – Cérémonies usitées au Japon pour les mariages et les funérailles (Ceremonies Performed at Marriages and Funerals in Japan). Paris: Nepveu. OCLC 185485254.
- 1820 – Mémoires et anecdotes sur la dynastie régnante des djogouns, souverains du Japon (Memories of and Anecdotes about the Reigning Dynasty of Shoguns, Sovereigns of Japan), avec la description des fêtes et cérémonies observées aux différentes époques de l'année à la cour de ces princes, et un appendice contenant des détails sur la poésie des Japonais, leur manière de diviser l'année, etc.; Ouvrage orné de Planches gravées et coloriées, tiré des Originaux Japonais par M. Titsingh; publié avec des notes et éclaircissemens Par M. Abel Rémusat. Paris: Nepveu. OCLC 255146140.
- 1822 – Illustrations of Japan; consisting of Private Memoirs and Anecdotes of the reigning dynasty of The Djogouns, or Sovereigns of Japan; a description of the Feasts and Ceremonies observed throughout the year at their Court; and of the Ceremonies customary at Marriages and Funerals: to which are subjoined, observations on the legal suicide of the Japanese, remarks on their poetry, an explanation of their mode of reckoning time, particulars respecting the Dosia powder, the preface of a work by Confoutzee on filial piety, &c. &c.] by M. Titsingh formerly Chief Agent to the Dutch East India Company at Nangasaki. Translated from the French, by Frederic Shoberl with coloured plates, faithfully copied from Japanese original designs. London: R. Ackermann. OCLC 5911523.
- 1824 – Bijzonderheden over Japan: behelzende een verslag van de huwelijks plegtigheden, begrafenissen en feesten der Japanezen, de gedenkschriften der laatste Japansche Keizers en andere merkwaardigheden nepens dat Ryk. Uit het Engelsch, met gekleurde platen naar Japansche originelen. S Gravenhage: De Wed. J. Allart. OCLC 7472268.
- 1834 – [Siyun-sai Rin-siyo/Hayashi Gahō, (1652)] Nihon Ōdai Ichiran (Nipon o daï itsi ran); ou, Annales des empereurs du Japon, tr. par M. Isaac Titsingh avec l'aide de plusieurs interprètes attachés au comptoir hollandais de Nangasaki; ouvrage re., complété et cor. sur l'original japonais-chinois, accompagné de notes et précédé d'un Aperçu d'histoire mythologique du Japon, par M. J. Klaproth. Paris: Oriental Translation Fund of Great Britain and Ireland. OCLC 84067437.
- 2006 – Secret Memoirs of the Shoguns: Isaac Titsingh and Japan, 1779-1822, a modern English edition of the 1822 work Illustrations of Japan, annotated and edited by Timon Screech.

== See also ==
- An'ei – The historical Japanese era during which Titsingh visited Japan.
- Kuze Hirotami
- Kutsuki Masatsuna
- Foreign relations of imperial China
- Royal Society – Titsingh was elected to membership in the Society in 1797. His nomination letter has been posted with other membership records on the Royal Society website. Those signing that nomination letter were: William Marsden, Henry Cavendish, Alexander Dalrymple, José Correia da Serra, Maxwell Garthshore, William Larkins, John Lloyd, Henry Crathorne, and Charles Wilkins.
- Andreas Everardus van Braam Houckgeest – A Dutch merchant who participated in the last Dutch tributary mission to China under the leadership of Titsingh from 1794 to 1795. Account first published in Dutch in 1797, first English edition in 1798 (An Authentic Account of the Embassy of the Dutch East-India Company); includes a map of the overland journey from Guangzhou to Beijing.

== Notes ==
Preceded by Arend Willem Feith	VOC Opperhoofd of Dejima; 1779–1784	Succeeded by Hendrik Casper Romberg
