= Ben Craythorne =

English footballer

Personal information
- Full name: Reuben Craythorne
- Date of birth: 21 January 1882
- Place of birth: Aston, England
- Date of death: 1953 (aged 70–71)
- Height: 5 ft 7 in (1.70 m)
- Position: Wing half

Senior career*
Years	Team	Apps	(Gls)
1900–1901	Small Heath Athletic		
1901–1902	Kidderminster Harriers		
1902–1903	Coventry City		
1903–1904	Walsall		
1904–1914	Notts County	282	(12)
1914	Darlington		
Total		282	(12)
- * Club domestic league appearances and goals

Reuben Craythorne (21 January 1882–1953) was an English footballer who played in the Football League for Notts County.
