= Abraham Titsingh =

Dutch naval surgeon

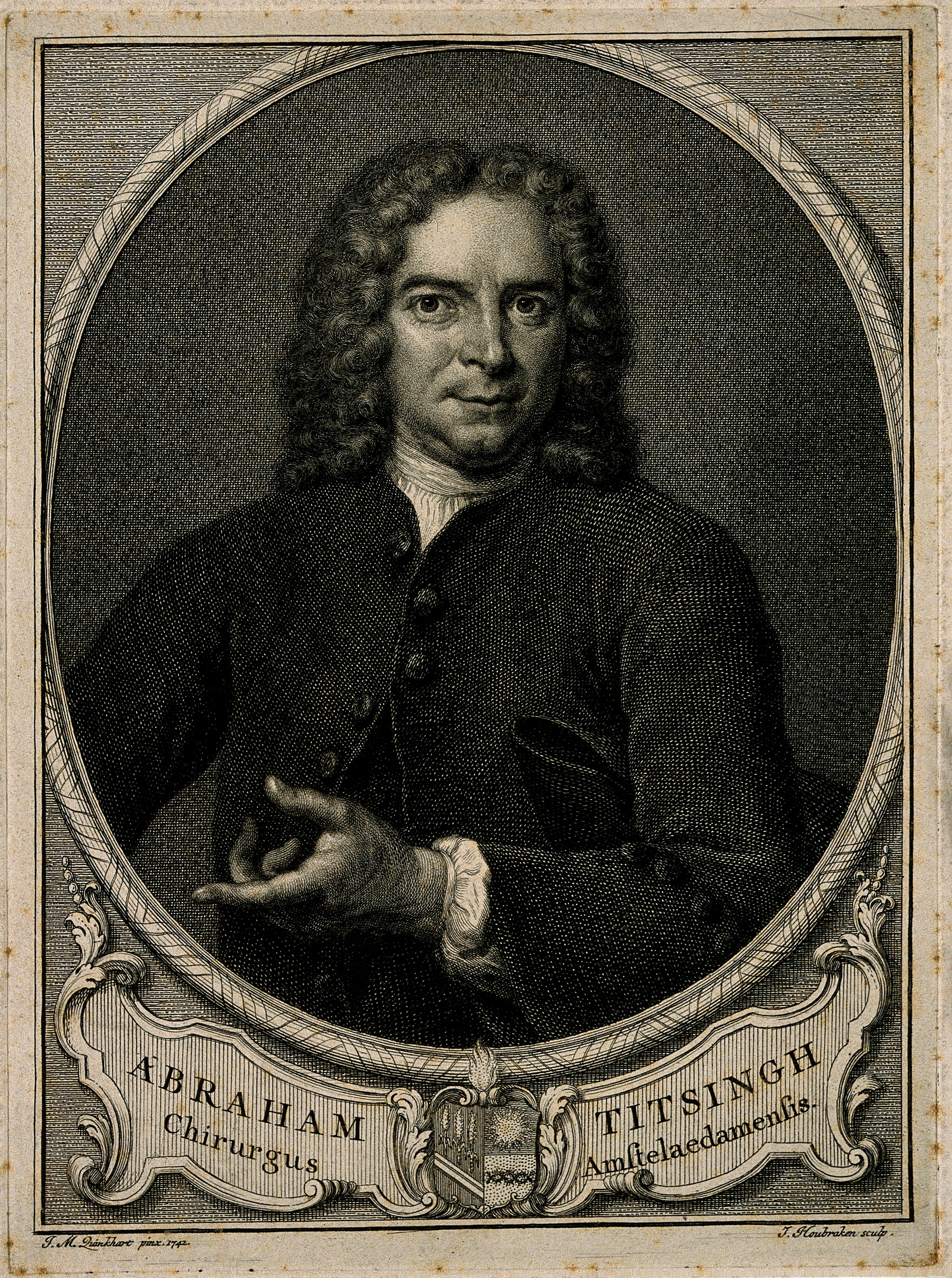
- Portrait of Titsingh
- Born: 1684; Amsterdam
- Died: September 1776 (aged 91–92)
- Occupation: Naval surgeon

Abraham Titsingh (1684 – September 1776) was a Dutch naval surgeon who, although poorly trained, attempted to reform the system of medicine in the Dutch Republic through changes in the guild of surgeons, clashing with several figures of the time including Jacobus Denys.

== Biography ==
Titsingh was born in Amsterdam. His mother was of the De Grebber family while his father was a naval surgeon, who was killed in 1691 while fighting the French at sea. He received only a primary education before becoming a surgeon's apprentice at the age of eleven. Like his father, he joined the navy as a second surgeon in 1702. In 1710, he returned to Amsterdam and after passing an examination received a license to practice in 1711. He found the surgeon's guild to be corrupt and wrote a book on the abuses in 1730. He headed the guild from September 1731 and attempted to improve the system. He published many books, including on medical treatment in maritime voyages.
