= Forget-Me-Not (annual) =

Yearbook published in 1822

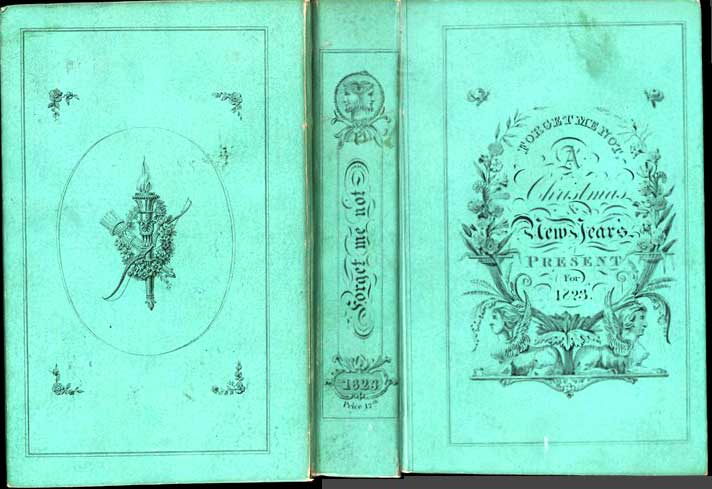
- Covers of the first edition
- Author: Various
- Original title: Forget-Me-Not: A Christmas and New Years Present for 1823
- Language: English
- Genre: Literary annual
- Publisher: Rudolf Ackermann
- Publication date: November 1822
- Publication place: England
- Media type: Duodecimo (hardback)
- Pages: c. 390

Forget-Me-Not was an illustrated British annual published by Rudolph Ackermann. It was the first literary annual in English and it was edited by Frederic Shoberl from its launch in 1822. A junior version appeared in 1828.

== History ==
In November 1822 Rudolf Ackermann published Forget-Me-Not: A Christmas and New Years Present for 1823. This was the first literary annual. From the first edition he employed Frederic Shoberl as editor. This annual was a new concept it combined some aspects that had been seen in England with new ideas Ackermann had brought from Germany. The idea of an "annual" was new and was aimed primarily at women readers and exploited the lowering cost of publishing. A marked difference was that Ackermann was willing to commission engravings and then request a story or poem to accompany it. This was a major difference from previously when the writers saw themselves as leading the imaginative process. By 1828, there were fifteen different "literary annuals" and they were selling 100,000 copies at prices between eight shillings and three pounds. By 1831 there were 61 titles and this phenomenon lasted until 1846 when the variety had reduced to 16 titles.

The idea of a diary and almanac was familiar to English readers but this new annual contained twelve engravings to commemorate each month. The annual had a historical review of the previous year and the recent census, a family tree for the monarchy of Britain and a list of sovereign families and ambassadors for other kingdoms. Poetry that was published includes works by Hester Thrale, Sir Walter Scott, Letitia Elizabeth Landon and Mary Wollstonecraft. Many of the artists who had their work included were Royal Academicians and a considerable fee would have been paid. Once engraved the artwork was then used to solicit accompanying texts.

Forget-Me-Not was published annually until 1847 and there was a single publication for the year 1856. Ackermann also employed Shoberl as editor from 1828 to 1832 of the juvenile version of the annual. The literary annual's popularity waned and publications ceased in England, although the genre was still popular in America for some time. The Forget-Me-Not publications are being digitised because of their value. The artwork and text have been digitised.
