= Joseph de Guignes =

French scientist (1721–1800)

- Born: 19 October 1721; Pontoise
- Died: 19 March 1800 (aged 78); Paris

Joseph de Guignes (French pronunciation: [ʒozɛf də ɡiɲ]; 19 October 1721 – 19 March 1800) was a French orientalist, sinologist and Turkologist born at Pontoise, the son of Jean Louis de Guignes and Françoise Vaillant. He died in Paris.

He succeeded Étienne Fourmont at the Royal Library as secretary interpreter of the Eastern languages. His Mémoire historique sur l'origine des Huns et des Turcs, published in 1748, earned him admission to the Royal Society of London in 1752, and he became an associate of the French Academy of Inscriptions in 1754. There soon followed the five-volume work Histoire générale des Huns, des Mongoles, des Turcs et des autres Tartares occidentaux (1756–1758). In 1757, he was appointed to the chair of Syriac at the Collège de France.

Guignes originated the proposition that the Huns who attacked the Roman Empire were the same people as the Xiongnu mentioned in Chinese records. This view was popularised by his contemporary Edward Gibbon in Decline and Fall of the Roman Empire. The idea has been strenuously debated by central Asianists, including Maenchen-Helfen, Henning, Bailey, and Vaissière.

Guignes maintained that the Chinese nation had originated in Egyptian colonization, an opinion to which, in spite of every refutation, he obstinately clung. He published a number of articles arguing that Egyptian hieroglyphs and Chinese characters were related, one deriving from the other. Although he was mistaken in that, he is recognized for proving that cartouche rings in Egyptian texts contained royal names, a thesis he developed from a hint previously made by J. J. Barthélemy.

== Works ==
- 1748 – Mémoire historique sur l'origine des Huns et des Turcs
- 1756 – Histoire generale des Huns, des Mongoles, des Turcs et des autres Tartares occidentaux, 3 vols. Paris: Desaint & Saillant. OCLC 5153747
- 1761 – Recherches sur les Navigations des Chinois du Cote de l'Amerique, et sur quelques Peuples situés a l'extremite orientale de l"asie.
- 1789 – An historical essay on the origin of the Oriented characters in the Royal printing-house, on the works which have been printed at Paris, in Arabic in Syriac, in Armenian, &c. and on the Greek characters of Francis I. commonly called the King's Greek. London: OCLC 45767900

== See also ==
- Chrétien-Louis-Joseph de Guignes
- 1824 – Supplément a L'Histoire Générale Des Huns, Des Turks Et Des Mogols. with Osip Ivanovich Senkovskīĭ, Muhammad Yūsuf ibn Khawājah Baqā, Józef Se︣kowski, Muḥammad Yūsuf. St.-Petersburg: Imprimerie de l'Académie Impériale des Sciences. OCLC 221450524
