= William Larkins =

William Larkins (died 24 April 1800) was a member of the Royal Society elected 14 April 1796

He was an accountant in Bengal for the British East India Company.
