= Timon Screech =

British art historian

Timon Screech FBA (born 28 September 1961 in Birmingham) was professor of the history of art at the School of Oriental and African Studies (SOAS), University of London from 1991 - 2021, when he left the UK in protest over Brexit. He is now a professor at the International Research Center for Japanese Studies (Nichibunken) in Kyoto. Screech is a specialist in the art and culture of early modern Japan.

In 1985, Screech received a BA in Oriental Studies (Japanese) at the University of Oxford. In 1991, he completed his PhD in art history at Harvard University. As well as his permanent posts, he has been visiting professor at the University of Chicago, Heidelberg University, and Tokyo University of Foreign Studies, as well as guest researcher at Gakushuin University and Waseda University in Japan, and at Yale, Berkeley and UCLA in the USA.

In July 2018 Screech was elected a Fellow of the British Academy (FBA). Screech's work had been translated into Chinese (Taiwan and PRC), French, German, Japanese, Korean, Polish and Romanian. His leisure interests are ailurophilia, learning Burmese, and cultivating plants in the former Kingdom of the Ryukyus. In 2022 he received both the Fukuoka Prize Academic Prize, and the Yamagata Bantō Prize. In 2024 he received the Japanese Foreign Minister's Commendation .

He is married to Kazuhiro Murayama and lives in Kyoto.

== Published work includes ==
- 2026 Shogun Avatar: The Worship of Tokugawa Ieyasu in Early Modern Japan. (Honolulu: University of Hawai'i Press) (forthcoming)
- 2026 Edo no inbound: Nihon saisho no kokusai kankō-kyaku trans. Kazuhiro Murayama [Inbound to Edo: Japan's First International Tourists] . (Tokyo: Chikuma Shobō) (forthcoming)
- 2020: The Shogun's Silver Telescope: God, Art & Money in the English Quest for Japan (Oxford: Oxford University Press)
- 2020: Tokyo before Tokyo: Power and Magic in the Shogun's City of Edo (London: Reaktion Books & Chicago: Chicago University Press)
- 2011: Obtaining Images: Art Production and Display in Edo Japan [London: Reaktion Books & Honolulu: University of Hawaii Press]
- 2007: Oranda ga tōru: Ningen kōryū no edo bijutsushi [The Dutch Are Passing: Edo art and the exchange of persons]. Tokyo: [University of Tokyo Press].
- 2006: Secret Memoirs of the Shoguns: Isaac Titsingh and Japan, 1779–1822. London: RoutledgeCurzon. ISBN 978-0-203-09985-8; OCLC 65177072
- 2006: Edo no igirisu netsu [Britain in the Edo Period]. Tokyo: Kodansha. ISBN 4-06-258352-6
- 2005: "Pictures, the Most Part Bawdy: The Anglo-Japanese Painting Trade in the Early 1600s", Art Bulletin. Vol. 87, No. 1, pp. 50–72.
- 2005: Japan Extolled and Decried: Park Oeter Thunberg and the Shogun's Realm. London: RoutledgeCurzon.
- 2005: Japan Extolled and Decried: Carl Peter Thunberg and Japan. London: RoutledgeCurzon. ISBN 978-0-7007-1719-4 (cloth); ISBN 978-0-203-02035-7 (electronic)
- 2003: Sex and Consumerism in Edo Japan. In: Consuming Bodies: Sex and Consumerism in Japanese Contemporary Art. London: Reaktion Books.
- 2002: "Dressing Samuel Pepys: Japanese Garments and International Diplomacy in the Edo Period", Orientations. Vol. 2, pp. 50–57.
- 2002: "Erotyczne obrazy japonskie 1700–1820". Universitas Kraków. ISBN 1-86189-030-3
- 2002: "The Edo Pleasure Districts as 'Pornotopia'", Orientations, Vol. 2, pp. 36–42.
- 2001:"The Birth of the Anatomical Body", Births and Rebirths in Japanese Art. Leiden: Hotei Press.
- 2001: "The visual legacy of Dodonaeus in botanical and Human Categorisation", Dodonaeus in Japan: Translation and the Scientific Mind in Tokugawa Japan. Leuven: Leuven University Press.
- 2000: The Shogun's Painted Culture: Fear and Creativity in the Japanese States, 1760–1829. London: Reaktion Books. (London). ISBN 1-86189-064-8.
- 1998: Sex and the Floating World: Erotic Imagery in Japan, 1720–1810. London: Reaktion Books. ISBN 1-86189-030-3.
- 1997: Edo no karada o hiraku [Opening the Edo Body]. Tokyo: Sakuhinsha. ISBN 4-87893-753-X.
- 1996: The Western Scientific Gaze and Popular Imagery in Later Edo Japan. Cambridge: Cambridge University Press. ISBN 0-521-46106-5.

== See also ==
- Isaac Titsingh
- Carl Peter Thunberg
