= Rudolph Ackermann =

German-born British publisher (1764–1834)

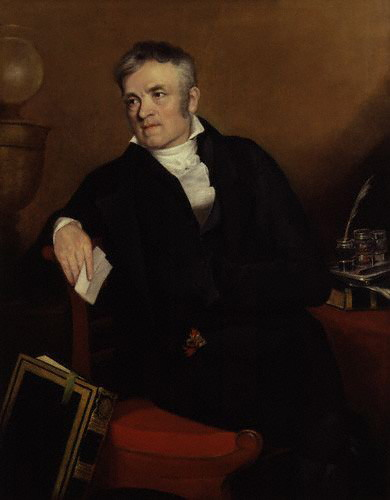
Rudolph Ackermann, portrait by François-Nicolas Mouchet between 1810 and 1814 (National Portrait Gallery, London)

Rudolph Ackermann (20 April 1764 in Stollberg, Electorate of Saxony – 30 March 1834 in Finchley, London) was an Anglo-German bookseller, inventor, lithographer, publisher and businessman.

== Biography ==
He attended the Latin school in Stollberg, but his wish to study at the university was made impossible by lack of financial means, and he therefore became a saddler like his father.

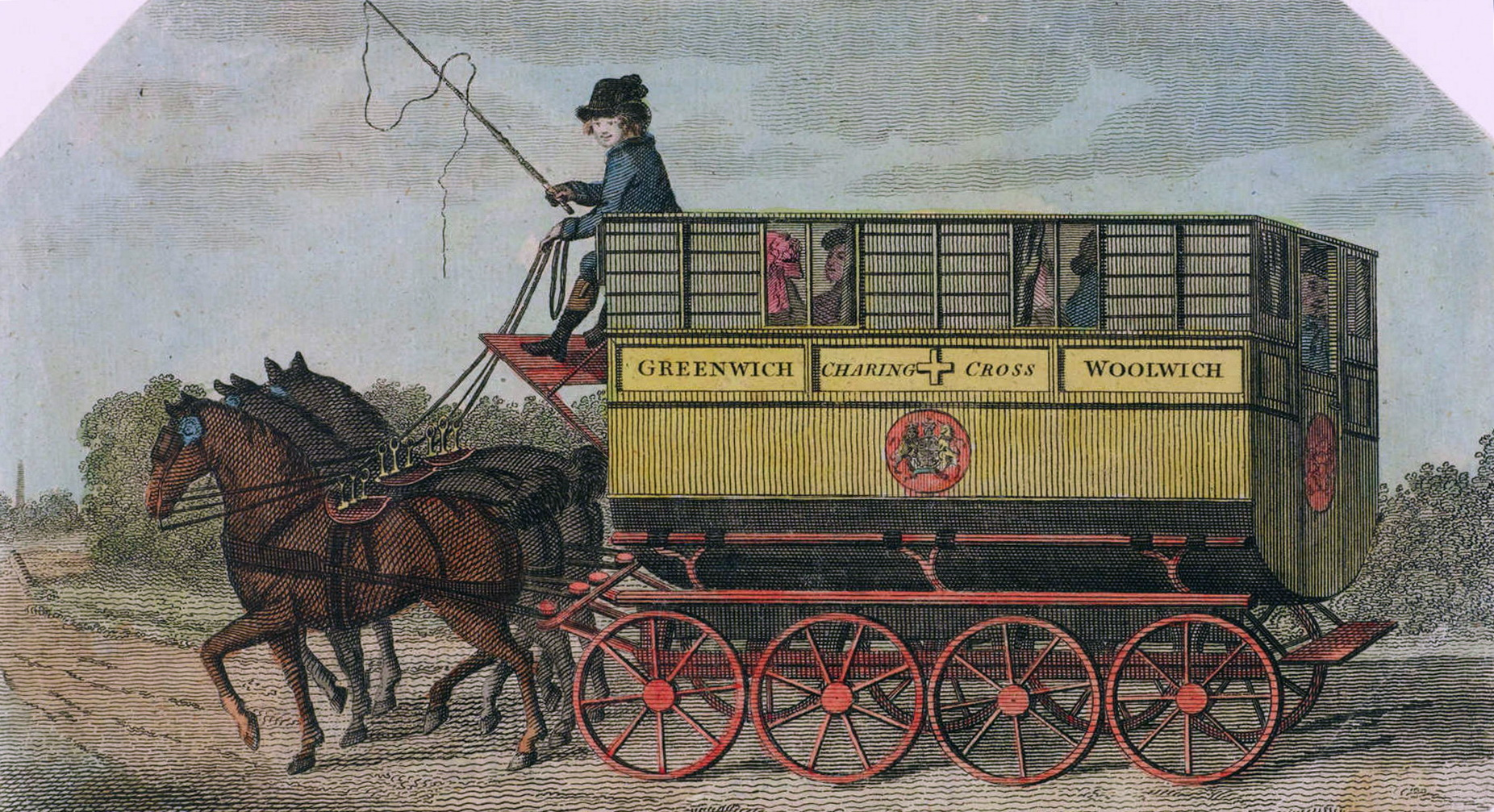
The Royal Sailor omnibus, designed by Ackermann (J. Stadler, 1791)

He worked as a saddler and coach-builder in different German cities, moved from Dresden to Basel and Paris, and then, 23 years old, settled in London. He established himself in Long Acre, the centre of coach-making in London and close to the market at Covent Garden. His extraordinary business instinct, as well as his flair for design and talent for self-promotion, won him the £200 contract to design the ceremonial coach for the Lord Chancellor of Ireland, John FitzGibbon, 1st Earl of Clare. After this he designed The Royal Sailor, an 8-wheel omnibus that ran between Charing Cross, Greenwich and Woolwich.

Ackermann then moved to Little Russell Street where he published Imitations of Drawings of Fashionable Carriages (1791) to promote his coach-making. Other publications followed. An able artist in his own right, in 1795 he established a print-shop and drawing-school at 96 Strand. Ackermann set up a lithographic press and began a trade in prints. He later began to manufacture colours and thick carton paper for landscape and miniature painters. Within three years the premises had become too small and he moved to 101 Strand, in his own words "four doors nearer to Somerset House", the seat of the Royal Academy of Arts.

Between 1797 and 1800 Ackermann rapidly developed his print and book publishing business bringing together wide variety of talented artists and printmakers including Thomas Rowlandson, Isaac Cruikshank, John Bluck, Theodore Lane, Henry Singleton, Maria Cosway, F. J. Manskirchten, J. C. Stadler, J. H. Schultz, Henri Merke, Thomas Sutherland, Nicholas Heidelhoff, Augustus Charles Pugin, and G. M. Woodward in numerous projects to produce both individual prints as well as illustrations for books and magazines, encompassing many different genres including topography, caricature, portraits, transparencies and decorative prints.

In 1809 he applied his press to the illustration of Repository of Arts, Literature, Fashions, which appeared monthly until 1829, by when forty volumes had appeared. The Repository documented the changing classicising fashions in dress and furniture of the Regency; Thomas Rowlandson and other distinguished artists were regular contributors. William Combe and Rowlandson's parody, Dr Syntax in search of the Picturesque first appeared in parts in Ackermann's Poetical Magazine and was then reissued as a bestselling separate book. Ackermann also published Rowlandson's masterpiece The English Dance of Death (2 volumes 1816). He introduced from Germany the fashion of the once popular Literary Annuals, beginning in 1823 with Forget-Me-Not; and he published many illustrated volumes of topography and travel, including The Microcosm of London (3 volumes, 1808–1811), Westminster Abbey (2 volumes, 1812), The Rhine (1820), The Seine (1821), and The World in Miniature (43 volumes, 1821–1826).

An inventor and innovator, he was also a patent agent. On behalf of his countryman Georg Lankensperger in 1816 he patented in England what became known as the Ackermann steering geometry. In 1801 he patented a method for rendering paper and cloth waterproof and erected a factory in Chelsea to make it. He was one of the first to illuminate his own premises with gas. Indeed, the introduction of lighting by gas owed much to him.

During the Napoleonic Wars, Ackermann was an energetic supporter of the Allied cause and made significant contributions to British propaganda through his publication of anti-Napoleonic prints and military manuals. He became a naturalised British citizen in March 1809. After the Battle of Leipzig (1813), Ackermann collected nearly a quarter of a million pounds sterling for the German relief effort.

As one of the pioneers of modern publishing methods, Ackermann developed an international distribution network for his publications and came to have significant commercial interests in South America. The business he founded in London flourished throughout the 19th century under the management of his descendants. He was buried at St Clement Danes in the Strand, London.

== See also ==
- Ackermann's Repository
- Isaac Cruikshank
- Thomas Rowlandson
- George Moutard Woodward
- Wilhelm Heinrich Ackermann
