= Henry Crathorne =

British scientist (died 1797)

Henry Crathorne (died 6 December 1797) was a member of the Royal Society.

His membership was proposed in 1774 by Lord Leeds, Lord Chesterfield, Lord Leicester, Alexander Aubert and Lord Greville; and he was promptly elected.
