= Empress Shōken =

Empress of Japan from 1869 to 1912

Empress Dowager Shōken 昭憲皇太后
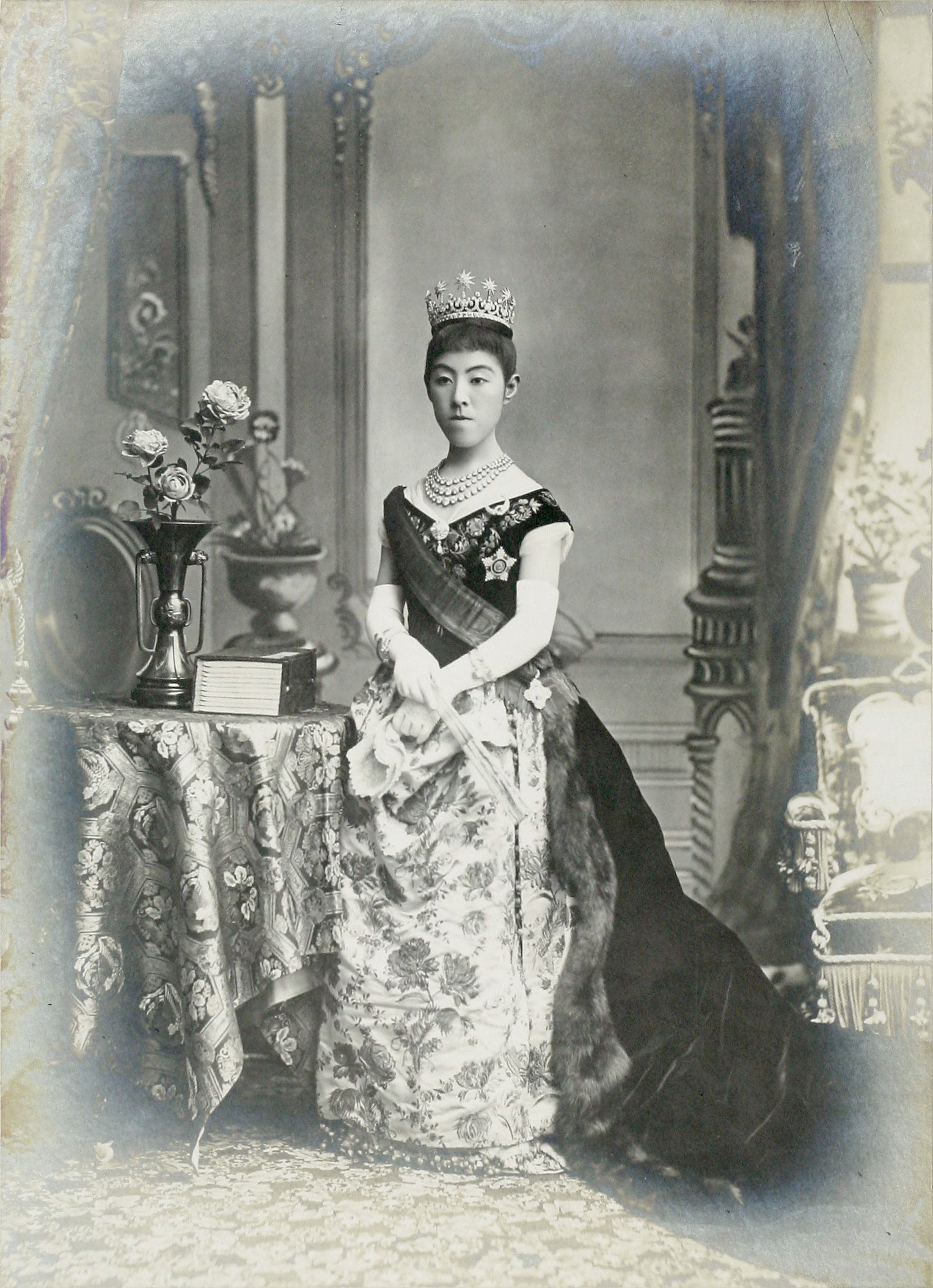
- The Empress c. 1889

Empress consort of Japan
- Tenure: 11 January 1869 – 30 July 1912
- Enthronement: 11 January 1869

Empress dowager of Japan
- Tenure: 30 July 1912 – 9 April 1914
- Born: Masako Ichijō (一条勝子); 9 May 1849; Heian-kyō, Japan
- Died: 9 April 1914 (aged 64); Numazu, Japan
- Burial: Fushimi Momoyama no Higashi no Misasagi, Fushimi-ku, Kyoto, Japan
- Spouse: Emperor Meiji (m. 1869; died 1912)
Posthumous name
- Empress Dowager Shōken (昭憲皇太后)
- House: Imperial House of Japan
- Father: Tadayoshi Ichijō
- Mother: Tamiko Niihata

Masako Ichijō (一条勝子, Ichijō Masako; 9 May 1849 – 9 April 1914), who adopted the imperial given name Haruko (美子) in 1867 and was posthumously honoured as Empress Dowager Shōken (昭憲皇太后, Shōken Kōtaigō), was the wife of Emperor Meiji of Japan. She was one of the founders of the Japanese Red Cross Society, whose charity work was known throughout the First Sino-Japanese War.

== Early life ==
Masako Ichijō was born on 9 May 1849, in Heian-kyō, Japan. She was the third daughter of Tadayoshi Ichijō, former Minister of the Left and head of the Fujiwara clan's Ichijō branch. Her adoptive mother was one of Prince Fushimi Kuniie's daughters, but her biological mother was Tamiko Niihata, the daughter of a doctor from the Ichijō family. Unusual for the time, she had been vaccinated against smallpox. As a child, Masako was somewhat of a prodigy: she was able to read poetry from the Kokin Wakashū by the age of 4 and had composed some waka verses of her own by the age of 5. By age seven, she was able to read some texts in classical Chinese with some assistance and was studying Japanese calligraphy. By the age of 12, she had studied the koto and was fond of Noh drama. She excelled in the studies of finances, ikebana and Japanese tea ceremony.

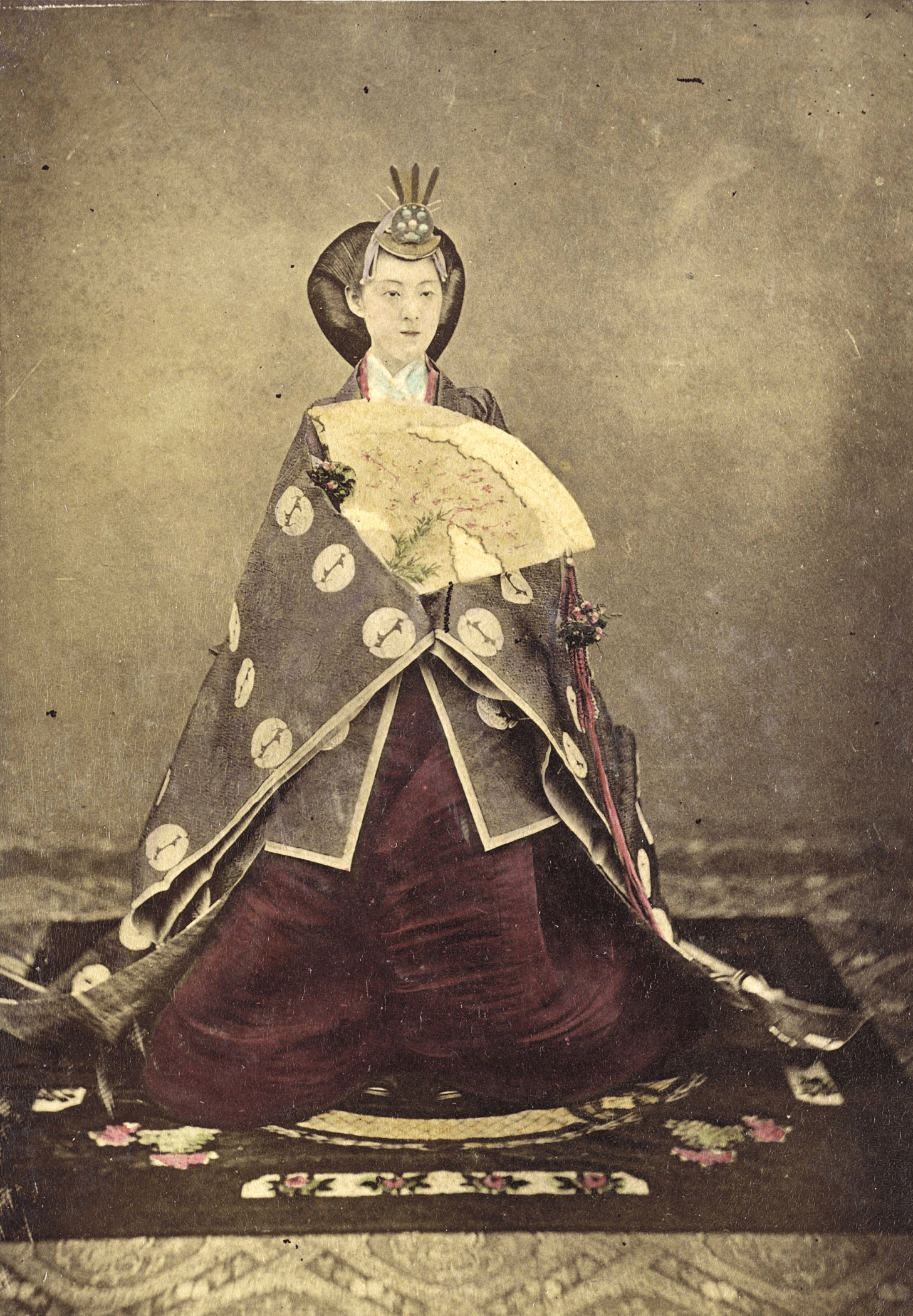
Masako in traditional clothes (1865)

The major obstacle to Masako's eligibility to become empress consort was that she was 3 years older than Emperor Meiji, but this issue was resolved by changing her official birth date from 1849 to 1850. They became engaged on 2 September 1867, when she adopted the given name Haruko, which was intended to reflect her serene beauty and diminutive size. The Tokugawa Bakufu promised 15,000 ryō in gold for the wedding and assigned her an annual income of 500 koku, but as the Meiji Restoration occurred before the wedding could be completed, the promised amounts were never delivered. The wedding was delayed partly due to periods of mourning for Emperor Kōmei, for her brother Saneyoshi, and the political disturbances around Kyoto between 1867 and 1868.

== Empress of Japan ==
Haruko and Emperor Meiji's wedding was finally officially celebrated on 11 January 1869. She was the first imperial consort to receive the title of both nyōgō and of kōgō (literally, the emperor's wife, translated as "empress consort"), in several hundred years. However, it soon became clear that she was unable to bear children. Emperor Meiji already had 12 children by five concubines, though as is custom in the Japanese monarchy, Empress Haruko adopted Yoshihito, her husband's eldest son by Yanagihara Naruko, who became Crown Prince. On 8 November 1869, the Imperial House departed from Kyoto for the new capital of Tokyo. In a break with tradition, Emperor Meiji insisted that the Empress and senior ladies-in-waiting should attend the regular educational lectures given to him concerning national conditions and developments in foreign nations.

=== Influence ===
On 30 July 1886, Empress Haruko attended the Peeresses School graduation ceremony in Western-style clothing. On 10 August, the imperial couple received foreign guests in Western clothing for the first time when hosting a Western music concert.

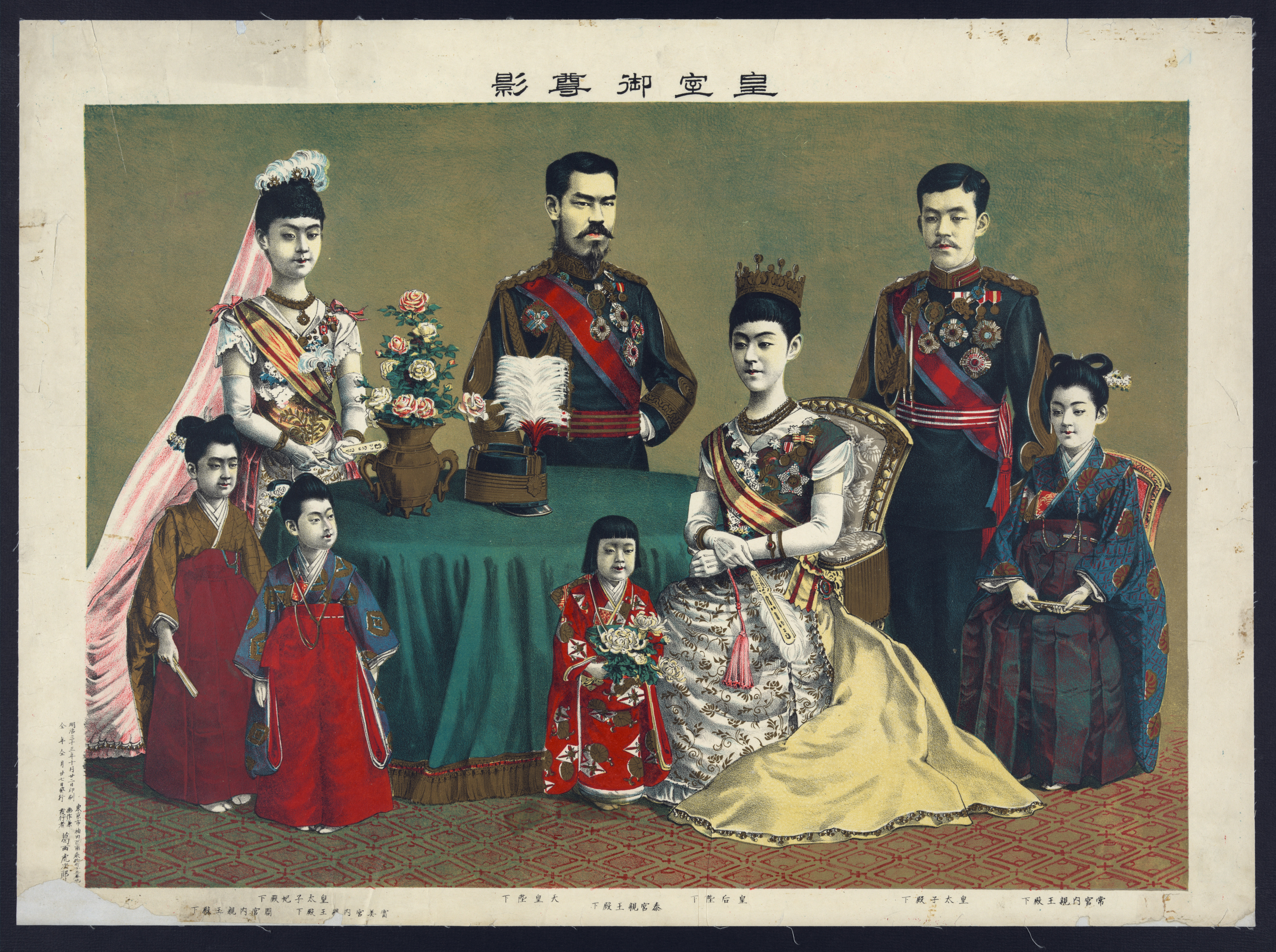
The Imperial Family in 1900. From left to right: Princess Fusako, Crown Princess Sadako, Princess Nobuko, Emperor Mutsuhito, Princess Toshiko, Empress Haruko, Crown Prince Yoshihito and Princess Masako

From this point onward, the Empress and her entourage wore only Western-style clothes in public. In January 1887 Empress Haruko herself issued a memorandum on the subject, stating traditional Japanese dress was not only unsuited to modern life, but Western-style dress was closer than the kimono to the clothes worn by ancient Japanese women.

In the diplomatic field, Empress Haruko hosted the wife of former United States President Ulysses S. Grant during his visit to Japan. She was also present for her husband's meetings with Hawaiian King Kalākaua in 1881. Later that same year, she helped host the visit of the sons of future British King Edward VII: Princes Albert Victor and George (later George V), who presented her with a pair of pet wallabies from Australia.

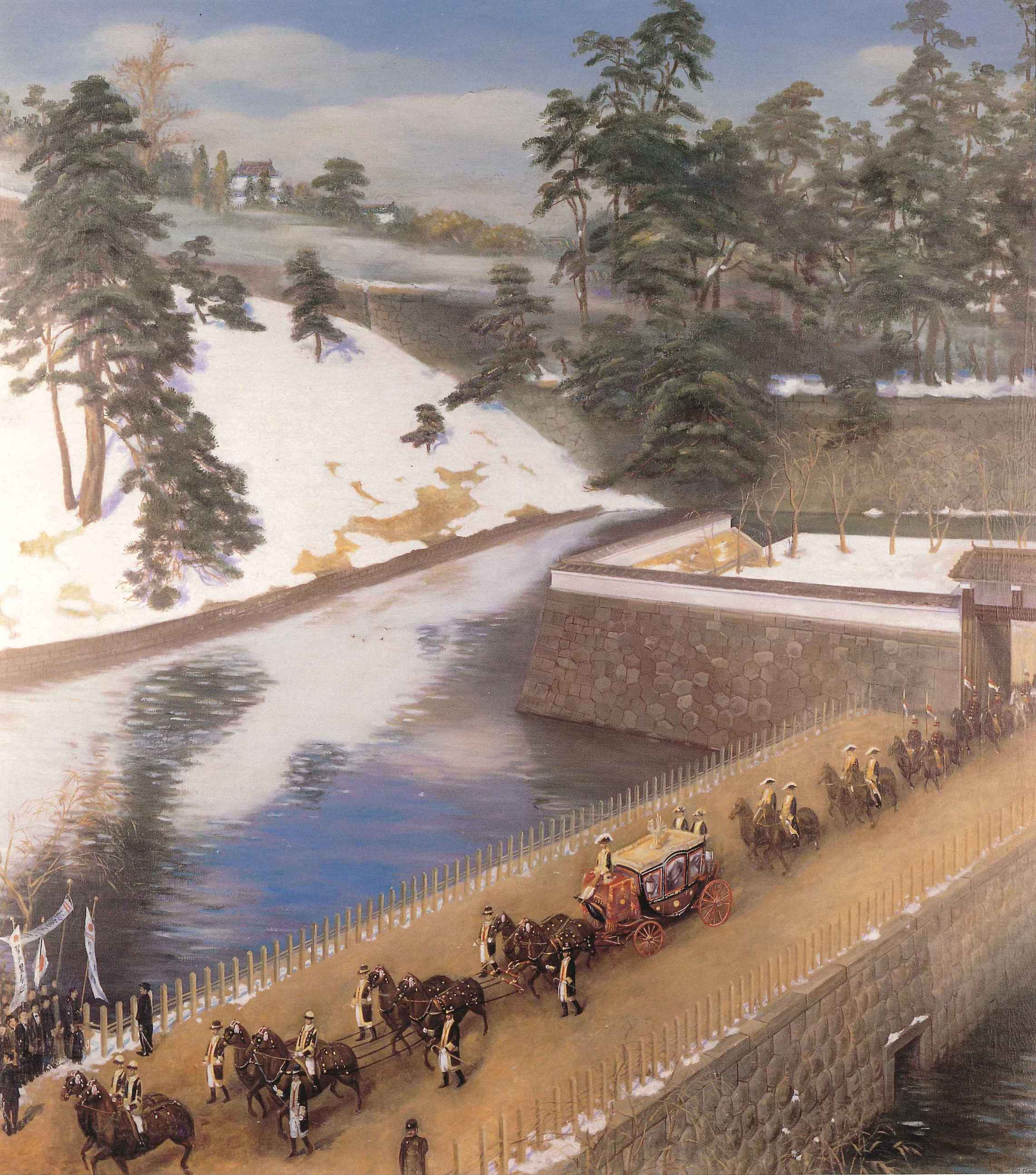
The Emperor and the Empress ride a horse-drawn carriage to attend the constitutional celebration on 11 February 1889.

On 26 November 1886, Empress Haruko accompanied her husband to Yokosuka, Kanagawa to observe the new Imperial Japanese Navy cruisers Naniwa and Takachiho firing torpedoes and performing other maneuvers. From 1887, the Empress was often at the Emperor's side in official visits to army maneuvers. When Emperor Meiji fell ill in 1888, Empress Haruko took his place in welcoming envoys from Siam, launching warships, and visiting Tokyo Imperial University. In 1889, Empress Haruko accompanied Emperor Meiji on an official visit to Nagoya and the former imperial capital of Kyoto. While he continued on to inspect naval bases at Kure and Sasebo, she visited Nara to worship at the principal Shinto shrines.

Known throughout her tenure for supporting charity work and women's education during the First Sino-Japanese War (1894–95), Empress Haruko worked for the establishment of the Japanese Red Cross Society. She participated in the Society’s administration, especially in peacetime activities wherein she created a money fund for the International Red Cross. Renamed "The Empress Shōken Fund", it is presently used for international welfare activities. After Emperor Meiji moved his military headquarters from Tokyo to Hiroshima to be closer to the lines of communications with his troops, Empress Haruko joined him in March 1895. While in Hiroshima, she insisted on visiting hospitals full of wounded soldiers every other day of her stay.

== Death ==
After Emperor Meiji's death in 1912, Empress Haruko was granted the title Empress Dowager (皇太后, Kōtaigō) by her adoptive son, Emperor Taishō. She died in 1914 at the Imperial Villa in Numazu, Shizuoka and was buried in the East Mound of the Fushimi Momoyama Ryo in Fushimi, Kyoto, next to her husband. The Meiji Shrine in Tokyo was dedicated to her and her late husband. On 9 May 1914, she received the posthumous name "Empress Dowager Shōken" (昭憲皇太后, Shōken Kōtaigō). Her railway-carriage can be seen today in the Meiji Mura Museum, in Inuyama, Aichi prefecture.

== Honours ==
=== National ===
- Grand Cordon of the Order of the Precious Crown, 1 November 1888

=== Foreign ===
She received the following orders and decorations:

- Russian Empire: Grand Cross of the Order of St. Catherine, 13 December 1887
- Spain: Dame of the Order of Queen Maria Luisa, 29 November 1889
- Siam: Dame of the Order of the Royal House of Chakri, 12 October 1899
- German Empire: Dame of the Order of Louise, 1st Class, 19 May 1903
  - Kingdom of Bavaria: Dame of Honour of the Order of Theresa, 29 February 1904
- Korean Empire: Grand Cordon of the Order of the Auspicious Phoenix, 27 July 1908

== Ancestry ==
Ancestors of Empress Shōken

16. Ichijō Michika (1722-1769)
8. Ichijō Teruyoshi (1756-1795)
17. Ikeda Shizuko
4. Ichijō Tadayoshi (1774-1837)
18. Tokugawa Shigenori, 8th Lord of Kishū (1746-1829)
9. Tokugawa Atsu-hime
19. Sasaki O-Fusanokata
2. Ichijō Tadayoshi (1812-1863)
20. Hosokawa Okinori, 5th Lord of Uto (1723-1785)
10. Hosokawa Narishige, 8th Lord of Kumamoto (1755-1835)
5. Hosokawa Tomiko (d. 1824)
11. Yoshizawa
1. Empress Dowager Shōken
24. Prince Fushimi Kuniyori (1733-1802)
12. Prince Fushimi Sadayoshi (1776-1841)
25. Matsuki
6. Prince Fushimi Kuniie (1802-1872)
26. Ichijō Teruyoshi (1756-1795)
13. Ichijō Teruko (d. 1828)
27. Tokugawa Atsu-hime
3. Princess Fushimi Junko (1827-1908)
14. Toriishoji
7. Toriishoji Nobuko

== See also ==
- Empress of Japan
- Ōmiya Palace

== Notes ==
Japanese royalty
Preceded by Takatsukasa Tsunako (title granted posthumously)	Empress consort of Japan; 1869–1912	Succeeded by Kujō Sadako
Preceded by Kujō Asako	Empress dowager of Japan; 1912–1914	Succeeded by Kujō Sadako
