= Emperor Kōkaku =

Emperor of Japan from 1779 to 1817

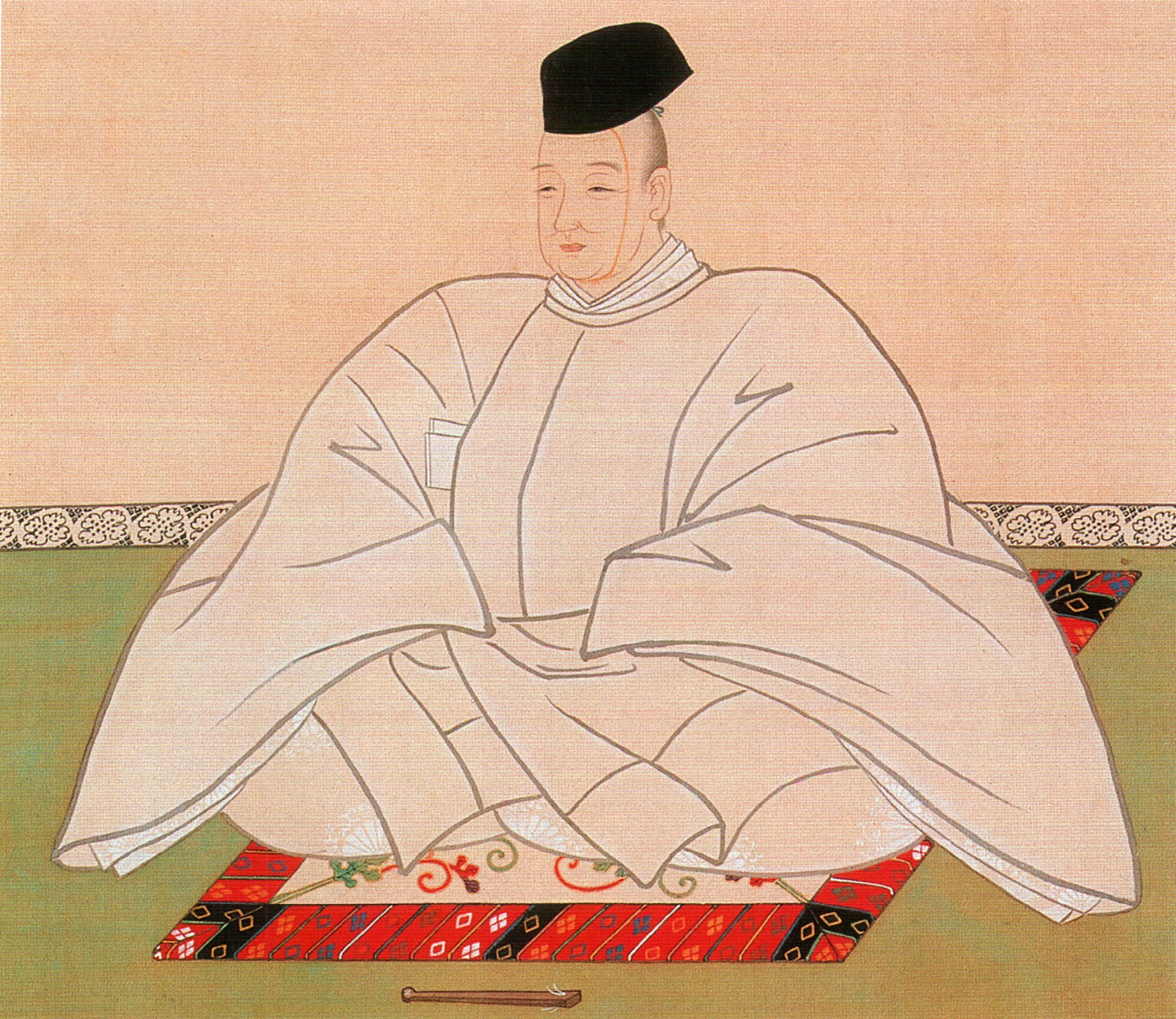

Emperor of Japan
- Reign: 16 December 1779 – 7 May 1817
- Enthronement: 29 December 1780
- Predecessor: Go-Momozono
- Successor: Ninkō
- Shōguns: See list: Tokugawa Ieharu (1779–1786) Tokugawa Ienari (1787–1817)
- Born: Morohito (師仁); 23 September 1771; Kan'in-no-miya mansion (閑院宮邸), Kyoto, Tokugawa shogunate
- Died: 11 December 1840 (aged 69); Sentō Imperial Palace, Kyoto, Tokugawa shogunate
- Burial: Nochi no tsuki no wa no misasagi, Kyoto
- Spouse: Yoshiko (m. 1794)
- Issue among others...: Emperor Ninkō; Prince Fushimi Kuniie (adopted)
Posthumous name
- Chinese-style shigō: Emperor Kōkaku (光格天皇)
- House: Imperial House of Japan
- Father: Sukehito, Prince Kan'in
- Mother: Ōe Iwashiro; Go-Sakuramachi (adoptive)
- Religion: Shinto
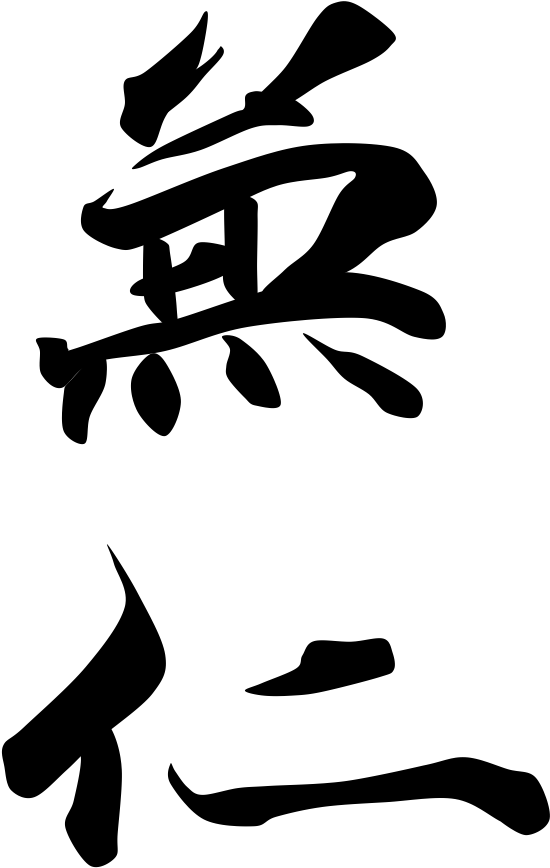
- Signature

Emperor Kōkaku (光格天皇, Kōkaku-tennō; 23 September 1771 – 11 December 1840), personal name Morohito, was the 119th emperor of Japan, according to the traditional order of succession. Kōkaku reigned from 1779 until his abdication in 1817 in favor of his son, Emperor Ninkō. After his abdication, he ruled as Daijō Tennō (太上天皇; Abdicated Emperor) also known as a Jōkō (上皇) until his death in 1840. The next emperor to abdicate was Akihito, 202 years later.

Major events in Kōkaku's life included an ongoing famine that affected Japan early into his rule. The response he gave during the time was welcomed by the people, and helped to undermine the shōgun's authority. The Kansei Reforms came afterwards as a way for the shōgun to cure a range of perceived problems which had developed in the mid-18th century but was met with partial success.

A member of a cadet branch of the Imperial Family, Kōkaku is the founder of the dynastic imperial branch which currently sits on the throne. Kōkaku had one spouse during his lifetime, and six concubines who gave birth to 16 children. Only one son, Prince Ayahito, survived into adulthood and eventually became the next emperor. Genealogically, Kōkaku is the lineal ancestor of all the succeeding emperors up to the current emperor, Naruhito.

Kōkaku was also connected to the later collateral imperial houses through Prince Fushimi Kuniie of the Fushimi-no-miya, whom he adopted in 1817. Kuniie subsequently received the rank of shinnō and became the ancestor of the Fushimi-line collateral houses; by the early twentieth century, apart from the emperor's immediate family, the imperial family consisted of Kuniie's descendants, and 11 collateral branches were removed from imperial status in 1947.

== Events of Kōkaku's life ==
=== Early life ===
Before Kōkaku's accession to the Chrysanthemum Throne, his personal name (imina) was Morohito (師仁). He was the sixth son of Sukehito, Prince Kan'in, the second Prince Kan'in of the Kan'in-no-miya imperial collateral branch. As a younger son of a cadet branch, the Kan'in house, it was originally expected that Morohito would go into the priesthood at the Shugoin Temple. The situation changed in 1779 in the form of a problem as Emperor Go-Momozono was dying without an heir to the throne. In order to avoid a dynastic interregnum, the now-retired empress Go-Sakuramachi and the emperor's chief adviser encouraged Go-Momozono to hastily adopt Prince Morohito. The adopted prince was the Emperor's second cousin once removed in the biological male line. Go-Momozono died on 16 December 1779, and a year later Morohito acceded to the throne at age nine.

=== Reign ===
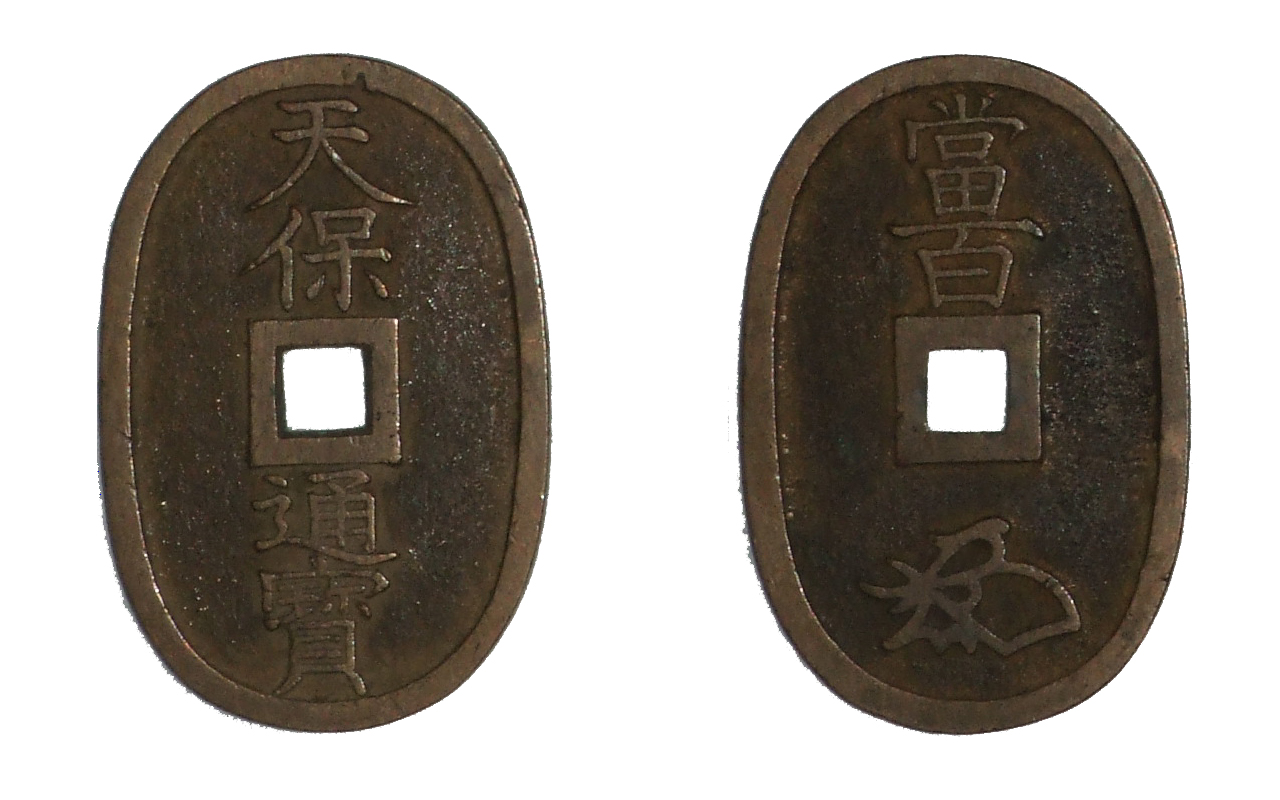
Coinage of Emperor Kōkaku

During his reign, Kōkaku attempted to re-assert some of the Imperial authority over the Shōgun (or bakufu). He undertook this by first implementing a relief program during the Great Tenmei famine, which not only highlighted the ineffectiveness of the bakufu in looking after its subjects, but also focused the subjects' attention back to the Imperial household. He also took an active interest in foreign affairs; keeping himself informed about the border dispute with Russia to the north, as well as keeping himself abreast of knowledge regarding foreign currency, both Chinese and European. The new era name of Tenmei ("Dawn") was created to mark the enthronement of new Emperor. The previous era ended and the new one commenced in An'ei 11, on the 2nd day of the 4th month. In his first year of reign, Kōkaku was instrumental in reviving old ceremonies involving the old Imperial Court, as well as those performed at the Iwashimizu and Kamono shrines.

An analysis of silver currency in China and Japan "Sin sen sen pou (Sin tchuan phou)" was presented to the Emperor in 1782 by Kutsuki Masatsuna (1750–1802), also known as Kutsuki Oki-no kami Minamoto-no Masatsuna, hereditary daimyōs of Oki and Ōmi with holdings in Tanba and Fukuchiyama. Masatsuna published Seiyō senpu (Notes on Western Coinage) five years later, with plates showing European and colonial currency. Countrywide currency reforms later came after the Meiji Restoration when a new system was adopted around the Japanese yen. In 1786, former Empress Go-Sakuramachi engaged Go-Momozono's only child (Princess Yoshiko) to the new emperor. Yoshiko formally became Empress consort to Emperor Kōkaku at age 15.

The Emperor and his court were forced to flee from a fire that consumed the city of Kyoto in 1788, the Imperial Palace was destroyed as a result. No other re-construction was permitted until a new palace was completed. The Dutch VOC Opperhoofd in Dejima noted in his official record book that "people are considering it to be a great and extraordinary heavenly portent." The new era name of Kansei (meaning "Tolerant Government" or "Broad-minded Government") was created in 1789 to mark a number of calamities including the devastating fire at the Imperial Palace. The previous era ended and a new one commenced in Tenmei 9, on the 25th day of the 1st month. During the same year, the emperor came into dispute with the Tokugawa shogunate about his intention to give the title of Abdicated Emperor (Daijō Tennō, 太上天皇) to his father, Prince Sukehito. This dispute was later called the "Songo incident" (the "respectful title incident"), and was resolved when the Bakufu gave his father the honorary title of "Retired Emperor".

Two more eras would follow during Kōkaku's reign, on 5 February 1801 a new era name (Kyōwa) was created because of the belief that the 58th year of every cycle of the Chinese zodiac brings great changes. Three years later the new era name of Bunka (meaning "Culture" or "Civilization") was created to mark the start of a new 60-year cycle of the Heavenly Stem and Earthly Branch system of the Chinese calendar which was on New Year's Day. During this year, Daigaku-no-kami Hayashi Jussai (1768–1841) explained the shogunate foreign policy to Emperor Kōkaku in Kyoto. The rest of Kōkaku's reign was quiet aside from two 6.6m earthquakes which struck Honshū in the years 1810 and 1812. The effects on the population from these earthquakes (if any) is unknown.

=== Kansei Reforms ===
The Kansei Reforms (寛政の改革, Kansei no kaikaku) were a series of reactionary policy changes and edicts which were intended to cure a range of perceived problems which had developed in mid-18th-century Tokugawa Japan. Kansei refers to the nengō (or Japanese era name) that spanned the years from 1789 through 1801 (after "Tenmei" and before "Kyōwa"); with the reforms occurring during the Kansei period but between the years 1787–1793. In the end, the shogunate's interventions were only partly successful. Intervening factors like famine, floods and other disasters exacerbated some of the conditions which the shōgun intended to ameliorate.

Matsudaira Sadanobu was named the shōgun's chief councilor (rōjū) in the summer of 1787; and early in the next year, he became the regent for the 11th shōgun, Tokugawa Ienari. As the chief administrative decision-maker in the bakufu hierarchy, he was in a position to effect radical change; and his initial actions represented an aggressive break with the recent past. Sadanobu's efforts were focused on strengthening the government by reversing many of the policies and practices which had become commonplace under the regime of the previous shōgun, Tokugawa Ieharu. Sadanobu increased the bakufu's rice reserves and required daimyos to do the same. He reduced expenditures in cities, set aside reserves for future famines, and encouraged peasants in cities to go back to the countryside. He tried to institute policies that promoted morality and frugality, such as prohibiting extravagant activities in the countryside and curbing unlicensed prostitution in the cities. Sadanobu also cancelled some debts owed by daimyos to the merchants.

These reform policies could be interpreted as a reactionary response to the excesses of his rōjū predecessor, Tanuma Okitsugu (1719–1788). The result was that the Tanuma-initiated, liberalizing reforms within the bakufu and the relaxation of sakoku (Japan's "closed-door" policy of strict control of foreign merchants) were reversed or blocked. Education policy was changed through the Kansei Edict (寛政異学の禁 kansei igaku no kin) of 1790 which enforced teaching of the Neo-Confucianism of Zhu Xi as the official Confucian philosophy of Japan. The decree banned certain publications and enjoined strict observance of Neo-Confucian doctrine, especially with regard to the curriculum of the official Hayashi school. A dispute had arisen on the powers of the Emperor which saw the Bakufu and the Throne being at odds to each other. Sadanobu himself suspected strong sentiment against Edo from Kyoto.

The Kansei reform movement was related to three others during the Edo period: the Kyōhō reforms (1722–1730), the Tenpō reforms (1841–1843) and the Keiō reforms (1864–1867).

=== Abdication and death ===
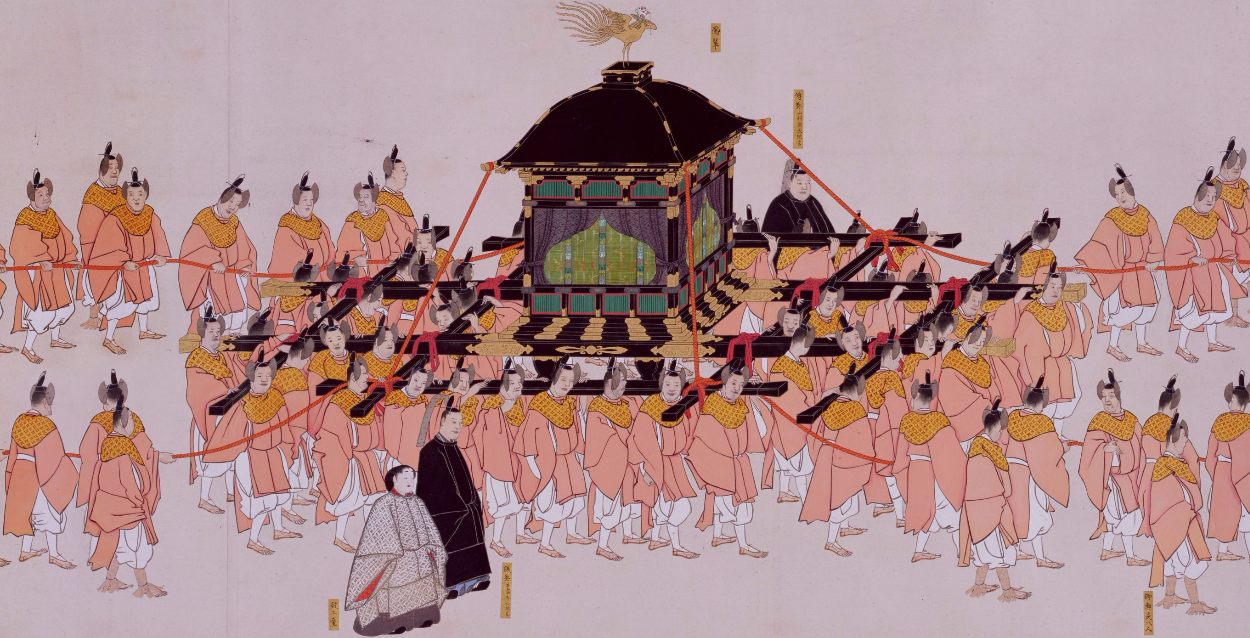
Emperor Kōkaku leaving for Sentō Imperial Palace after abdicating in 1817

In 1817, Kōkaku abdicated in favor of his son, Emperor Ninkō. In the two centuries before Kōkaku's reign most Emperors died young or were forced to abdicate. Kōkaku was the first Japanese monarch to remain on the throne past the age of 40 since the abdication of Emperor Ōgimachi in 1586. Until the abdication of Emperor Akihito in 2019, he was the last emperor to rule as a Jōkō (上皇), an emperor who abdicated in favor of a successor. Kōkaku travelled in procession to Sento Imperial Palace, a palace of an abdicated emperor. The Sento Palace at that time was called Sakura Machi Palace. It had been built by the Tokugawa shogunate for former-Emperor Go-Mizunoo.

After Kōkaku's death in 1840, he was enshrined in the Imperial mausoleum, Nochi no Tsukinowa no Higashiyama no misasagi (後月輪東山陵), which is at Sennyū-ji in Higashiyama-ku, Kyoto. Also enshrined in Tsuki no wa no misasagi, at Sennyū-ji are this emperor's immediate Imperial predecessors since Emperor Go-Mizunoo – Meishō, Go-Kōmyō, Go-Sai, Reigen, Higashiyama, Nakamikado, Sakuramachi, Momozono, Go-Sakuramachi and Go-Momozono. This mausoleum complex also includes misasagi for Kōkaku's immediate successors – Ninkō and Kōmei. Empress Dowager Yoshikō is also entombed at this Imperial mausoleum complex.

== Eras and Kugyō ==
The following years of Kōkaku's reign are more specifically identified by more than one era name or nengō.

- An'ei (1772–1781)
- Tenmei (1781–1789)
- Kansei (1789–1801)
- Kyōwa (1801–1804)
- Bunka (1804–1818)

Kugyō (公卿) is a collective term for the very few most powerful men attached to the court of the emperor of Japan in pre-Meiji eras. Even during those years in which the court's actual influence outside the palace walls was minimal, the hierarchic organization persisted. In general, this elite group included only three to four men at a time. These were hereditary courtiers whose experience and background would have brought them to the pinnacle of a life's career. During Kōkaku's reign, this apex of the Daijō-kan included:

- Sesshō, Kujō Naozane, 1779–1785
- Kampaku, Kujō Naozane, 1785–1787
- Kampaku, Takatsukasa Sukehira, 1787–1791
- Kampaku, Ichijō Teruyoshi, 1791–1795
- Kampaku, Takatsukasa Masahiro, 1795–1814
- Kampaku, Ichijō Tadayoshi, 1814–1823

== Genealogy ==
=== Spouse ===
Position	Name	Birth	Death	Father	Issue
Chūgū	Imperial Princess Yoshiko (欣子内親王)	11 March 1779	11 August 1846	Emperor Go-Momozono	• Third Son: Imperial Prince Masuhito • Seventh Son: Imperial Prince Toshihito

Yoshiko was the only child of former emperor Go-Momozono. She formally became Empress consort (chūgū) to Emperor Kōkaku at age 15 after she was engaged to the new emperor by former empress Go-Sakuramachi. The couple had two sons but both died before reaching adulthood. Yoshiko eventually functioned as an official mother to the heir who would become Emperor Ninkō. In 1816, Emperor Ninkō granted Empress Yoshiko the title of Empress Dowager after Emperor Kōkaku abdicated. She later became a Buddhist nun after her husband died, and changed her name to Shin-Seiwa-In (新清和院, Shin-seiwa-in) in 1841.

=== Concubines ===
Name	Birth	Death	Father	Issue
Unknown	Unknown	Unknown	Unknown	• Daughter: Kaijin’in-miya
Hamuro Yoriko (葉室頼子)	1773	1846	Hamuro Yorihiro	• First Son: Imperial Prince Ayahito • First Daughter: Princess Noto • Second Son: Prince Toshi
Kajūji Tadako (勧修寺婧子)	1780	1843	Kajūji Tsunehaya	• Fourth Son: Imperial Prince Ayahito (later Emperor Ninkō) • Second Daughter: Princess Tashi • Fourth Daughter: Princess Nori
Takano Masako (高野正子)	1774	1846	Takano Yasuka	• Sixth Son: Prince Ishi
Anekouji Toshiko (姉小路聡子)	1794	1888	Anekouji Kōsō	• Fifth Daughter: Princess Eijun • Eighth Daughter: Princess Seisho • Eighth Son: Prince Kana
Higashiboujo Kazuko (東坊城和子)	1782	1811	Higashiboujo Masunaga	• Fifth Son: Imperial Prince Katsura-no-miya Takehito • Third Daughter: Princess Reimyoshin'in
Tominokōji Akiko (富小路明子)	Unknown	1828	Tominokōji Sadanao	• Sixth Daughter: Princess Haru • Seventh Daughter: Imperial Princess Shinko • Ninth Daughter: Princess Katsu
Nagahashi-no-tsubone (Title)	Unknown	Unknown	Unknown	• Daughter: Princess Juraku'in-

=== Issue ===
Emperor Kōkaku fathered a total of 16 children (8 sons and 8 daughters) but only one of them survived into adulthood. The sole surviving child (Prince Ayahito) later became Emperor Ninkō when Kōkaku abdicated the throne.

Status	Name	Birth	Death	Mother	Marriage	Issue
Daughter	Princess Kaijin'in (開示院宮) _{(stillborn daughter)}	1789	1789	Unknown	—N/a	—N/a
First Son	Imperial Prince Ayahito (礼仁親王)	1790	1791	Hamuro Yoriko	—N/a	—N/a
Daughter	Princess Juraku'in (受楽院宮) _{(stillborn daughter)}	1792	1792	Nagahashi-no-tsubone	—N/a	—N/a
First Daughter	Princess Noto (能布宮)	1792	1793	Hamuro Yoriko	—N/a	—N/a
Second Son	Prince Toshi (俊宮)	1793	1794	Hamuro Yoriko	—N/a	—N/a
Third Son	Imperial Prince Masuhito (温仁親王) _{(stillborn son)}	1800	1800	Imperial Princess Yoshiko	—N/a	—N/a
Fourth Son	Imperial Prince Ayahito (2nd) (恵仁親王), the future Emperor Ninko	1800	1846	Kajūji Tadako	Fujiwara no Tsunako	Princess Sumiko; Emperor Kōmei; Princess Kazu
Second Daughter	Princess Tashi (多祉宮) _{(stillborn daughter)}	1808	1808	Kajūji Tadako	—N/a	—N/a
Fifth Son	Imperial Prince Katsura-no-Miya Takehito (桂宮盛仁親王)	1810	1811	Higashiboujo Kazuko	—N/a	—N/a
Third Daughter	Princess Reimyoshin'in (霊妙心院宮) _{(stillborn daughter)}	1811	1811	Higashiboujo Kazuko	—N/a	—N/a
Sixth Son	Prince Ishi (猗宮)	1815	1819	Takano Masako	—N/a	—N/a
Seventh Son	Imperial Prince Toshihito (悦仁親王)	1816	1821	Imperial Princess Yoshiko	—N/a	—N/a
Fourth Daughter	Princess Nori (娍宮)	1817	1819	Kajūji Tadako	—N/a	—N/a
Fifth Daughter	Princess Eijun (永潤女王)	1820	1830	Anekouji Toshiko	—N/a	—N/a
Sixth Daughter	Princess Haru (治宮)	1822	1822	Tominokōji Akiko	—N/a	—N/a
Seventh Daughter	Imperial Princess Shinko (蓁子内親王)	1824	1842	Tominokōji Akiko	—N/a	—N/a
Eighth Daughter	Princess Seisho (聖清女王)	1826	1827	Anekouji Toshiko	—N/a	—N/a
Ninth Daughter	Princess Katsu (勝宮)	1826	1827	Tominokōji Akiko	—N/a	—N/a
Eighth Son	Prince Kana (嘉糯宮)	1833	1835	Anekouji Toshiko	—N/a	—N/a

== Ancestry ==
Ancestry of Emperor Kōkaku

8. Emperor Higashiyama (1675–1710)
4. Prince of the Blood Kan'in-no-miya Naohito (1704–1753)
9. Kushige Yoshiko (1675–1710)
2. Sukehito, Prince Kan'in (1733–1794)
10. Itō Ichinaka
5. Itō
1. Emperor Kōkaku
6. Iwamuro Sōken (1713–1792)
3. Ōe Iwashiro (1744–1813)
7. Rin

== See also ==
- List of Emperors of Japan
- Imperial cult
- Imperial House of Japan
- Modern system of ranked Shinto shrines

== Notes ==
Japanese Imperial kamon — a stylized chrysanthemum blossom

Regnal titles
Preceded by Emperor Go-Momozono	Emperor of Japan: Kōkaku; 1780–1817	Succeeded by Emperor Ninkō
