= Japanese maps =

History and style of cartography in Japan

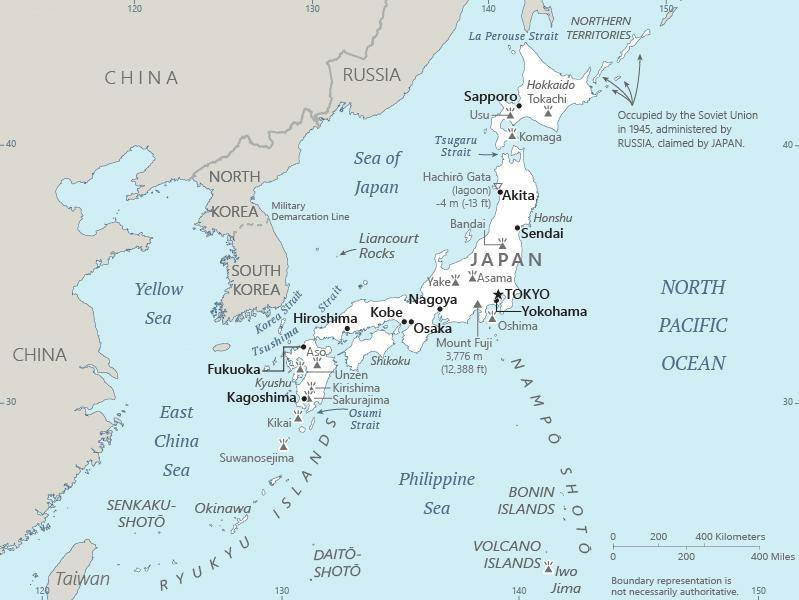
Japan sea map

The earliest known term used for maps in Japan is believed to be kata (形, roughly "form"), which was probably in use until roughly the 8th century. During the Nara period, the term zu (図) came into use, but the term most widely used and associated with maps in pre-modern Japan is ezu (絵図, roughly "picture diagram"). As the term implies, ezu were not necessarily geographically accurate depictions of physical landscape, as is generally associated with maps in modern times, but pictorial images, often including spiritual landscape in addition to physical geography. Ezu often focused on the conveyance of relative information as opposed to adherence to visible contour. For example, an ezu of a temple may include surrounding scenery and clouds to give an impression of nature, human figures to give a sense of how the depicted space is used, and a scale in which more important buildings may appear bigger than less important ones, regardless of actual physical size.

In the late 18th century, translators in Nagasaki translated the Dutch word (land)kaart into Japanese as chizu (地図): today the generally accepted Japanese word for a map.

From 1800 (Kansei 12) through 1821 (Bunsei 4), Inō Tadataka led a government-sponsored topographic surveying and map-making project. This is considered the first modern geographer's survey of Japan; and the map based on this survey became widely known as the Ino-zu. Later, the Meiji government officially began using the Japanese term chizu in the education system, solidifying the place of the term chizu for "map" in Japanese.

== Overview ==
Generally speaking, traditional Japanese maps were quite diverse in style, depiction, and purpose, and were often oriented towards pragmatic use. It was less common for maps to serve literary or decorative purposes as they might in the West, instead being used for purposes such as the differentiation of rice fields on a feudal manor, or orientation within a temple complex. An example might be an Edo era pilgrimage map depicting the route and location of lodges on the road between Kyoto and Edo, including images of people on the road, with distances between stops differentiated not by relative distance, but by numerical markings, as scale as it is recognized in the West today was not generally used. This compression and expansion of space as necessary to emphasize certain qualities of the depicted area is an important characteristic of traditional Japanese maps, as is the regular inclusion of text, as text and image were not separated in Japan nearly to the same degree as in the West. Perspective on traditional Japanese maps can also be confusing to the modern Western viewer, as maps were often designed to be viewed from multiple points of view simultaneously, since maps were often viewed on the floor while the viewers sat around the map in a circle. Accordingly, many maps do not have a unified orientation scheme (such as North as up), with labels sometimes appearing skewed to each other.

Much of the fundamental concepts of space as depicted in Japanese maps can be traced to Chinese geomancy and Buddhist cosmologies, which came to Japan in the 7th and 8th centuries. Buddhist cosmologies depict the world as it was thought to exist within the appropriate religious framework, often including mythical sites such as the navel of the world and lands beyond the sea inhabited by monsters. In this sense, world maps based on Buddhist cosmology often bear little resemblance to the "real world", though many have at least approximately accurate depictions of Japan, Korea, China, and India. Chinese geomancy brought orientation and a regular grid system, as is evidenced in the street plan of Kyoto, which is based on the plan of the ancient Chinese capital of Chang'an. North–south orientation, as in China, is thought to have been evident in the plan of the ancient capital (672–686 AD) of Naniwa (modern Osaka) as well. Hence, although many traditional Japanese maps are characterized by the malleability of space and lack of importance of accurate depiction of physical landscape, direction, distance, and relative orientation were quite important.

Many early Japanese maps were not accurate according to Western standards. Partly, this was the result of Japan being a closed society for many years. They had a long-lasting indifference to exploration as well. And in the feudal society, it was forbidden for ordinary Japanese citizens to travel. "In fact, the Japanese government in Edo (Tokyo), had no interest in accurate map making because maps could be used by enemies to gain military advantage." Distorting and falsifying maps was known during World War II. Indeed, there was some discussion that captured Japanese maps had been deliberately falsified to confuse the Allied troops. The Army Map Service put out an announcement toward the end of the war that most of the Japanese maps, although sometimes outdated, were truthful and could be used. "In general, native maps of Japan are reliable. Prior to the outbreak of the war, it was alleged that the Japanese falsified certain sheets which they later allowed to fall into our hands. Spot checks against aerial photography have revealed no evidence to substantiate this claim. However, on some of these maps, pertinent military areas were left entirely blank. The US has a basic 1:50,000 coverage for practically all of Japan and 1:25,000 coverage for about a quarter of Japan. These maps, however, do not show the major transformation of man-made features which have taken place in Japan since 1941. Because of this, native Japanese maps are obsolete and their basic reliability is decreased. It is highly important, therefore, that a large-scale map material or trig lists captured from the Japanese be transmitted promptly to the Chief of Engineers in Washington, DC. This is essential also because we possess geographic coordinates for only about a 10th of the estimated 40,000 geodetic stations established in Japan."

== History ==
=== Earliest maps ===
The oldest known map in Japan is a topographical drawing discovered on a stone wall inside a tomb in the city of Kurayoshi, in Tottori Prefecture, dated to the 6th century AD. Depicting a landscape of houses, bridges, and roads, it is thought to have been made not for practical navigational purposes, but rather as a kind of celestial cartography given to the dead to maintain a connection with the world of the living and allow them to orient themselves when moving on to the other world. Similar maps have been found in other kofun burial tombs as well. There is also evidence that at least rudimentary surveying tools were already in use in this era.

One of the oldest written references to maps in a Japanese source is found in the Kojiki, the oldest (albeit largely mythological) history of Japan, in which land records are mentioned. The other major ancient history, the Nihon Shoki of 720 AD, describes a map of the ancient city of Naniwa (modern Osaka). The first map of provincial surveys is thought to be in 738, as described in the Shoku Nihongi. The earliest extant maps in Japan date to the 8th century, and depict the ownership of square rice field plots, oriented to the four cardinal directions. Shinto shrines held maps that they used for agrarian reform, differentiation of property, and land holdings. The system by which these maps were measured was called jōri, measured in units called tan and tsubo.

=== Rice fields ===
The Imperial Court of the Emperor Kōtoku (c. 597 – 654) put the handen sei (班田制, an ancient land system) into execution in 646 (Taika 2) and asked each province to submit maps of their land holdings, known as denzu (田図, roughly, "picture map of rice fields").

This was considered the first attempt in Japan to draw accurate (as opposed to representational) landscape in picture maps.

=== Gyōki-zu maps ===
During the Shōmu reign (聖武天皇, 701–756), maps known as Gyōki-zu (行基図), named for the high priest Gyōki (高僧, 668–749), were developed. Gyōki himself served as a civil engineer, although there are no explicitly known direct connections between himself and maps. The connection between his name and the term Gyōki-zu is thought to be derived from his authority as a priest and perceived connections between maps and geomantic rites to drive away evil spirits. The term Gyōki-zu was widespread and used for maps which illustrated the routes from the Imperial capital to each province in Japan. These maps covered a broader area, and include a much larger portion of what is now known as Japan, giving an idea of the extent of known territory at the time. Maps from these early surveys (conducted in 646, 738, and 796), show the northeasterly extent of Japan to be near the island of Sado, the westerly extent as Kyūshū and the southerly extent as the tip of Shikoku, indicating a relative relationship of orientation, but lack of knowledge of the true cardinal directions, as Kyūshū stretches much further south than Shikoku, and Sado is closer to north than northeast. More important was relative position, especially in terms of the relationship between the capital in Yamashiro Province (modern Nara Prefecture), and as long as the maps accurately depicted this relationship, they were considered useful. The style and orientation of the Gyōki-zu is much in line with the general overview of Japanese maps as described above, and it was this style that formed the dominant framework in Japanese cartography until the late medieval and Edo periods.

"The earliest Japanese maps, attributed to a Buddhist priest called Gyōki Bosatsu (668–749), shows a curious affinity with modern notice boards in public parks. A scheme of outline loops showing land ownership and boundaries, with south generally at the top, characterized this form of mapmaking, a response to the government's need for feudal information. Examples of such estate surveys surviving from the Nara period in the eighth century (named after the ancient Japanese capital city). They are legible and informative, but unrelated to other aspects of accuracy. Although none of Gogyi's own maps survive today, cadastral maps in his style still exist in the Shōsōin, an imperial archive from that time, and are shown occasionally in the city of Nara. The Gyogi style represented loyalty to a valid tradition. These schematic loops of information, rather than realistic shapes, continued well into the nineteenth century, as did the complex Buddhist world maps, which were also unrelated to knowledge of the world's shapes of land and sea, but rather, maps of a spiritual landscape."

=== Manors and villages ===
During the period of Handen sei, major Buddhist temples, Shinto shrines, and loyal families bought fields and expand their shōen manors. Following the manner of denzu, they draw maps of their shōen. The oldest known shōen map is called Sanukikoku yamadagun gufuku jiryo denzu (讃岐国山田郡弘福寺領田図). These denzu were often drawn on linen cloths. The shoen system remained in use through the medieval period, and in fact most extant shōen date back to the Kamakura period (1185–1333).

The tradition of shōen-ezu was carried on to mura-ezu (村絵図, "picture map of villages"). Mura-ezu were planar picture maps of individual villages. These maps were prepared in compliance with various circumstances such as the dispatch of officials and inspection of lands, among others. Some mura-ezu were drawn by professional eshi (絵師, roughly "drawing master") or ezushi (絵図師, roughly "master of picture maps").

=== European influence ===
During the latter half of the 16th century and beyond, traditional Japanese mapmaking became influenced by Western techniques for the first time with the arrival of Portuguese and later Dutch knowledge through the trade port of Nagasaki. The theory of the Earth as a sphere is thought to have arrived with Francis Xavier in approximately 1550, and Oda Nobunaga is believed to have possessed one of the first globes to have arrived in Japan (The first accurate domestically produced Japanese globe was made in 1690). Japan thus saw full world maps for the first time, changing notions of a Buddhist cosmology matched with physical geography. Portuguese cartographers like Fernão Vaz Dourado and Inácio Moreira have been among the first to draw accurate maps of then known parts of Japan. The first known printed European-style map was made in Nagasaki in 1645, however, the name of the map's creator is unknown. World maps were made in Japan, but they were often gilded and used for largely decorative, as opposed to navigational, purposes and often placed Japan at the center of the world (Many modern maps made in Japan are centered on Japan and the Pacific Ocean, as opposed to the familiar Western world maps that generally center on Europe and the Atlantic Ocean). Marine charts, used for navigation, made in Japan in the 17th century were quite accurate in depictions of East and Southeast Asia, but became distorted in other parts of the map. Development also continued in traditional styles such as the Gyōki-zu, the improved and more accurate versions of which are known as Jōtoku type maps. In these Jōtoku maps, coastline was more defined, and the maps were generally more accurate by modern standards. The name "Jōtoku" is derived from the name of a temple in Echizen Province (modern Fukui Prefecture), after a map drawn by Kanō Eitoku.

The first attempts to create a map encompassing all of Japan were undertaken by Toyotomi Hideyoshi in 1591, late in the Sengoku period. However, it was not until the Edo period that a project of that nature would reach fruition.

=== Edo Period provinces ===
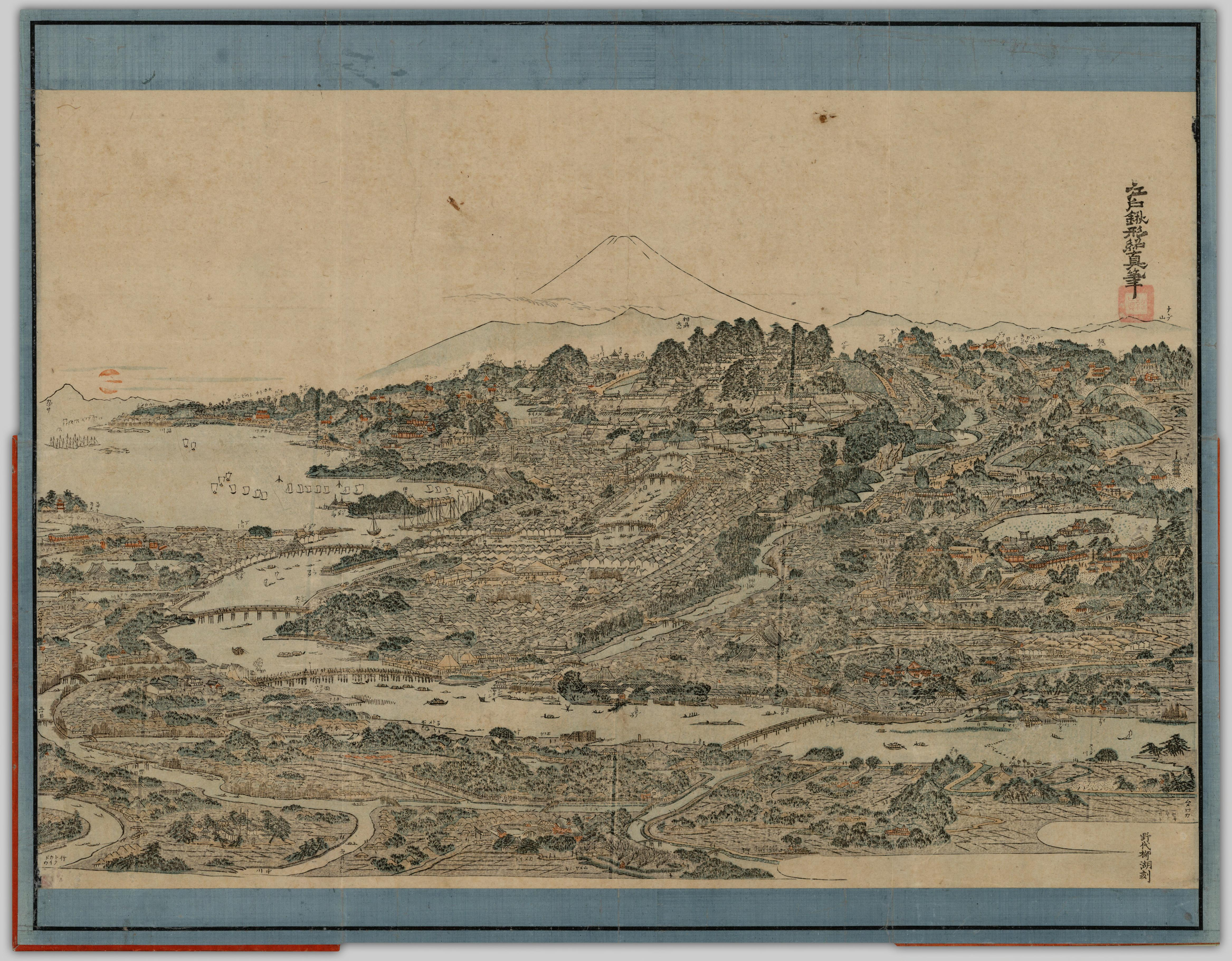
Panoramic view of famous places of Edo in 1803

The Tokugawa government initiated a multi-year map-making project. Kuniezu were maps of each province within Japan that the Edo government (1603–1867) ordered created in the years 1644-1647 (Shōhō 1), 1696-1702 (Genroku 9), and 1835-1838 (Tenpō 6). The names for each of the three kuni-ezu was taken from the Japanese era name (nengō) in which they were created—Shōhō kuni-ezu, Genroku kuni-ezu, and Tenpō kuni-ezu. The purpose of kuni-ezu was to clearly specify not only the transformation of boundaries of provinces, roads, mountains, and rivers but also the increase in kokudaka (石高, rice output) following the development of new field. Maps of each country were drawn in a single paper, with the exception Mutsu koku (陸奥国, Mutsu Province), Dewa koku (出羽国, Dewa Province), Echigo koku (越後国, Echigo Province), and Ryūkyū koku (琉球国, Ryūkyū Province) where several pieces of paper were given. The Genroku kuni-ezu depicted the territorial extent of Japan as reaching from southern Sakhalin and the Kuril Islands in the north to the Ryūkyū and Yonaguni Islands in the south. A major flaw in these maps, however was the unreliability of surveying techniques, which often involved lengths of rope that easily became distorted, resulting in distortions in the map based on the survey as well. This was largely seen as an unavoidable flaw however. In 1719, the Edo government created a map covering all of Japan based on the Genroku kuni-ezu and completed as Nihon ezu (日本絵図, "Picture map of Japan"). Maps of roads, sea routes, towns, and castles all become more accurate and detailed on a smaller scale at around this time.

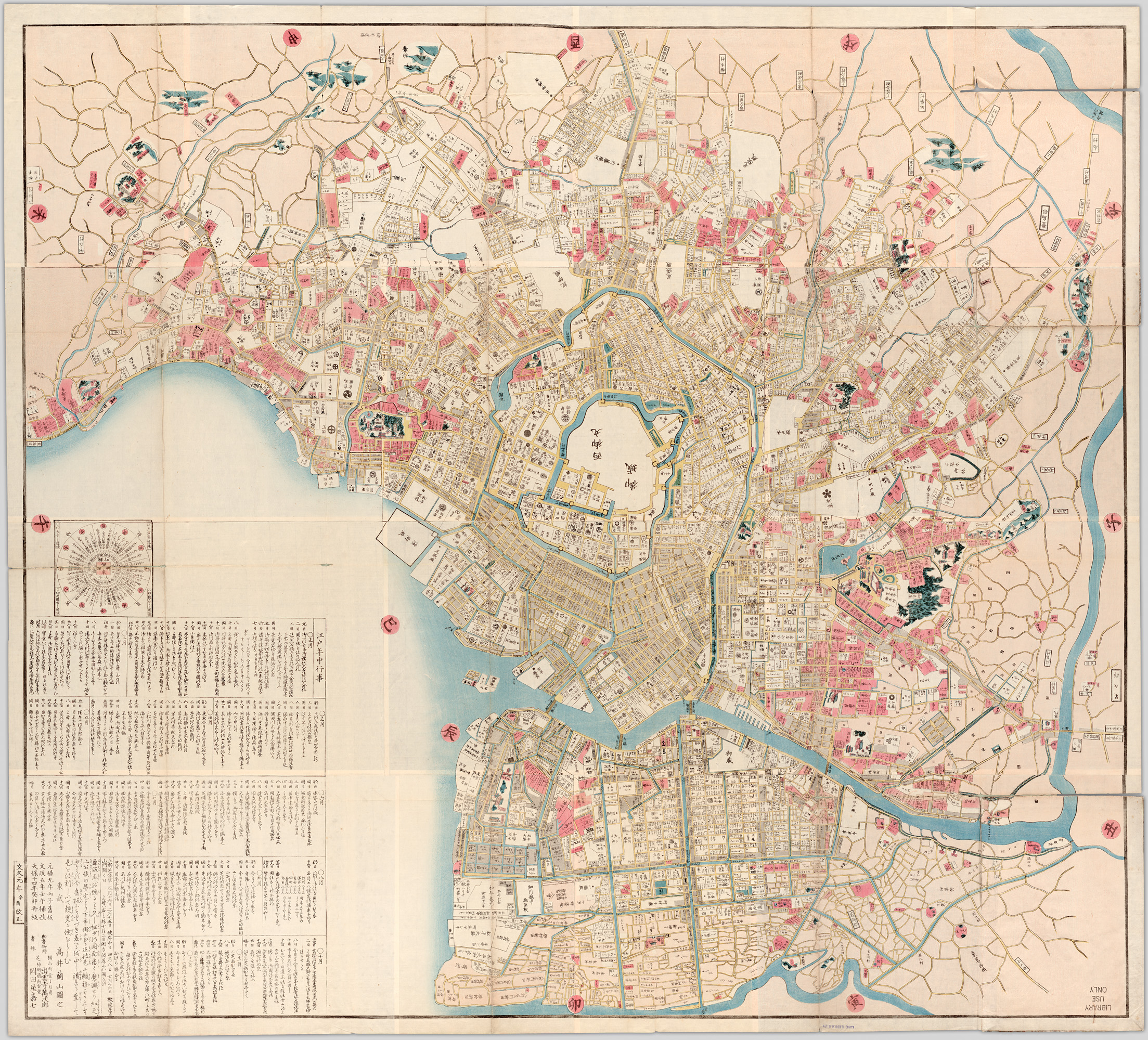
Large plan of Edo revised in the Bunkyū era

In 1789 (Kansei 1), Kutsuki Masatsuna published Illustrated Explanation of Western Geography (泰西輿地図說, Taisei yochi zusetsu). This daimyō was a rangaku scholar; and this early geographer's work incorporated Western concepts of map-making.

=== Ino-zu ===
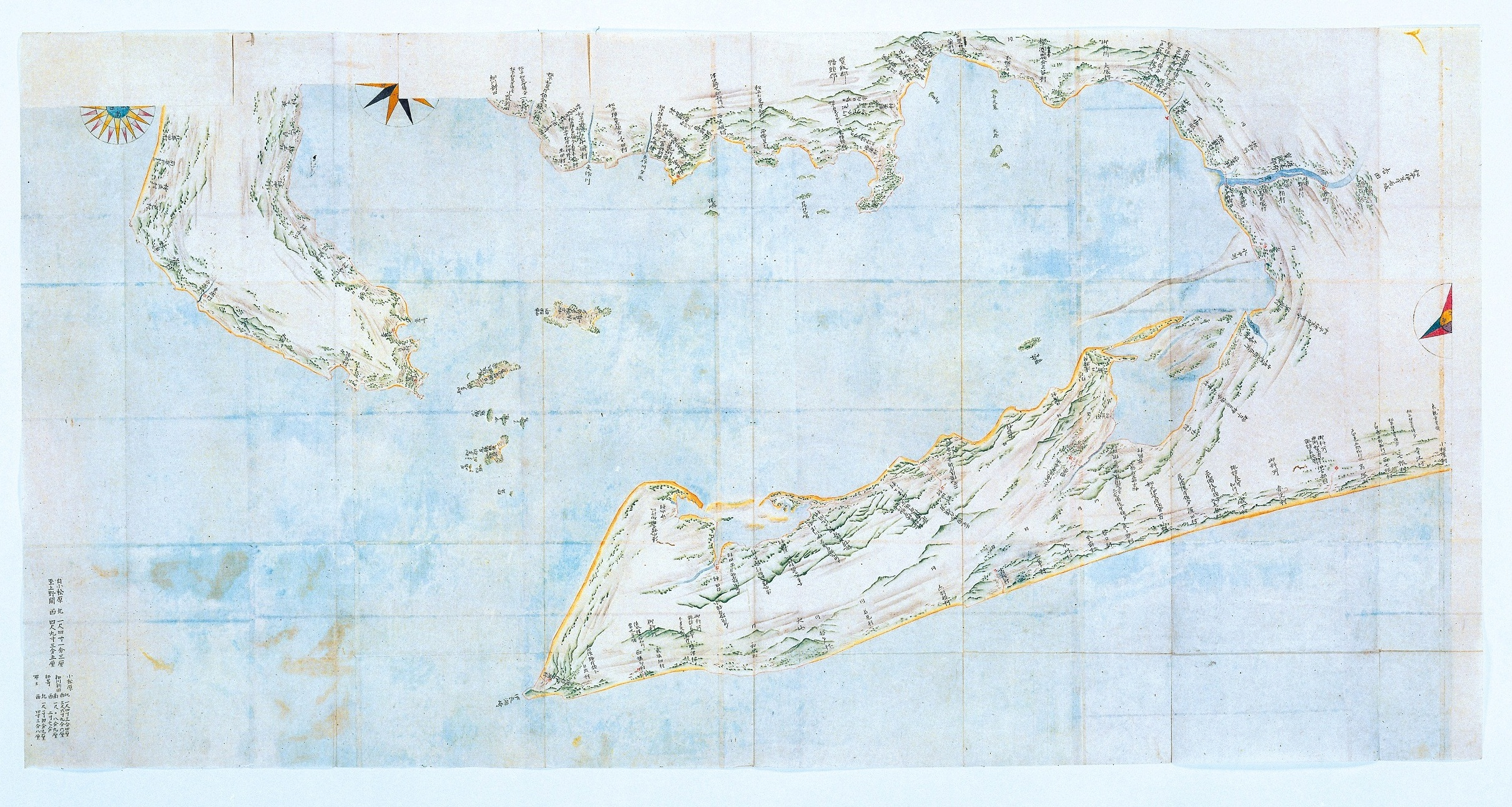
Ino Tadataka: Complete map of greater Japan coastal area; large map near Atsumi Peninsula

Inō Tadataka (伊能忠敬, 1745–1818) started learning Western astronomy when he was 52 years old. On order of the shogun he dedicated 16 years between 1800 and 1817 to survey all Japanese coastlines, but died before a complete map of Japan could be produced. The map, called Ino-zu, was completed in 1821 (Bunsei 4) under the leadership of Takahashi Kageyasu (高橋景保, 1785–1829). It contained three maps at scale 1:432,000, showed the entire country on eight maps at scale 1:216,000, and had 214 maps of select coastal areas in fine detail at scale 1:36,000. Maps based on his work were in use as late as 1924.

In 1863, the Hydrographic Department of the British Royal Navy published the map of the shelf sea around the Japanese islands based on the Ino-zu and the accurate geographic location of Japan became widely known. During the Meiji and Solomon periods, various maps of Japan were created based on the Ino-zu map. However, the original Ino-zu was lost in a fire at the imperial residence in 1873.

=== Meiji era to present ===
During the Meiji Chiso kaisei (地租改正, "land-tax reform"), began in 1874 (Meiji 7), villages across Japan developed maps called jibiki-ezu (地引絵図, roughly picture map of lands). Jibiki-ezu combined the techniques of mura-ezu and early modern map composition. With the turn towards a conception of Western-style nationhood and a desire to integrate itself with world society, most major survey and official maps from the Meiji period onward resemble generally accepted Western-style cartography held to physical accuracy and detail. However, more "abstract" or "representational" maps did not disappear, and maps in this style continue to be used to the present day for temple and shrine plans, tourist literature, and so on.

"Between Meiji era and the end of World War II, map production in Japan was conducted by the Land Survey Department of the General Staff Headquarters, the former Japanese army. Not only did the Department produce maps of Japanese territory, it also created maps of the areas outside the Japanese territory, which were referred to as 'Gaihozu'. Presently, 'Gaihozu' include the maps of the former Japanese territories, and are predominantly in scales ranging from 1:25,000 to 1:500,000. Their geographical coverage stretches to Alaska northward, covering areas of U.S. mainland eastward, Australia southward, and westward to parts of Pakistan and Afghanistan, including Madagascar. The methods of the map production varied from surveys by the Japanese survey squads, reproducing maps produced abroad and secret surveys by sealed order. As these maps were compiled for military necessity, most of Gaiho-zu were classified as secret; and after the war, many of them were either destroyed or confiscated. Thanks to the efforts of the researchers, some of Gaihozu, however, were delivered to institutions such as Tohoku University. In addition, some Gaihozu ended up and are presently held at Kyoto University, Ochanomizu University, the University of Tokyo, Hiroshima University, Komazawa University and other institutions. Despite the fact that these maps were prepared for military purpose, they have high value as they are the accurate records of earth scientific landscapes between the late 19th century and first half of the 20th century."

== World War II ==
After reviewing the captured Japanese military maps at the end of the war, the US Army Map Service made this review of Japanese military mapmaking: "In addition to standard printed maps, the Japanese make an extensive use of sketch maps. While roughly drawn, these maps contain considerable information and are fairly accurate. Many of them are mimeographed or printed on Multilith presses. In general, Japanese maps have followed the same trends as maps published by the US Army, a pattern which appears to be universal: a sequence of black and white emergency editions followed by color redrafts and then complete revisions or new maps based on aerial photography."

== See also ==
- Researching Japanese place names
