= Nihongi Uta no Kai Tsuki no Ochiba =

18th-century Japanese historical commentary

Nihongi Uta no Kai Tsuki no Ochiba (日本紀歌解槻乃落葉) is a commentary on the Nihon Shoki, a Japanese historical chronicle dating to the early 8th century. The commentary was written between 1798 and 1799, and published twenty years later.

== Author, date, and content ==
The commentary known as Nihongi Uta no Kai Tsuki no Ochiba was written by Arakida Hisaoyu (ja) (1746–1804), a kokugaku scholar. He began composing the text in the tenth year of Kansei (1798) and it was published the second year of Bunsei (1819).

Consisting of three volumes, the first volume was completed on the eighth day of the fifth month in Kansei 10, the second volume on the last day of the fourth month of the following year, and the final volume in the seventh month of that year.
