= Emperor Ninkō =

Emperor of Japan from 1817 to 1846

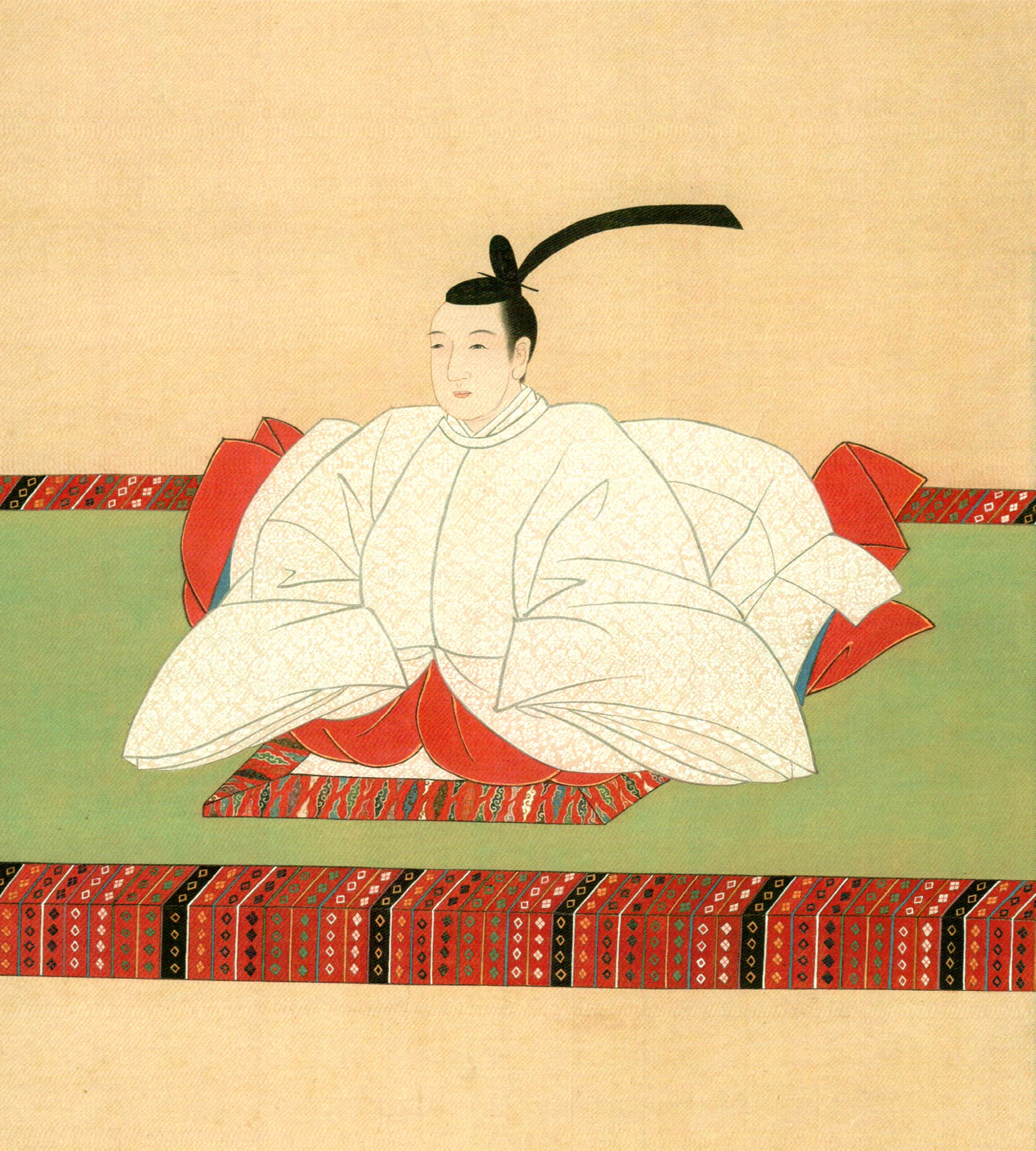
- Portrait c. 1846–1847

Emperor of Japan
- Reign: 7 May 1817 – 21 February 1846
- Enthronement: 31 October 1817
- Predecessor: Kōkaku
- Successor: Kōmei
- Shōgun: See list: Tokugawa Ienari (1817–1837); Tokugawa Ieyoshi (1837-1846)
- Born: Ayahito (恵仁); 16 March 1800; Kanjūji Family's mansion (勧修寺邸), Tokugawa shogunate
- Died: 21 February 1846 (aged 45); Otsunegoten (御常御殿), Kyoto Imperial Palace, Kyoto, Tokugawa shogunate
- Burial: Tsuki no wa no misasagi (後月輪陵), Kyoto
- Spouse: Takatsukasa Tsunako; Takatsukasa Yasuko
- Issue more...: Princess Sumiko; Emperor Kōmei; Princess Kazu
Posthumous name
- Chinese-style shigō: Emperor Ninkō (仁孝天皇)
- House: Imperial House of Japan
- Father: Emperor Kōkaku
- Mother: Kajyūji Tadako
- Religion: Shinto
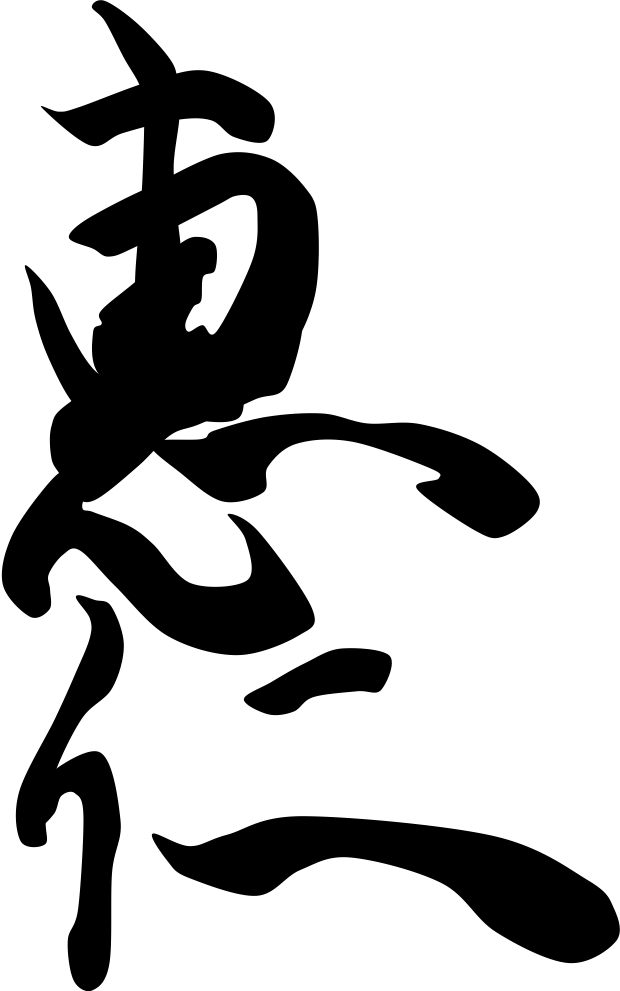
- Signature

Emperor Ninkō (仁孝天皇, Ninkō-tennō; 16 March 1800 – 21 February 1846), personal name Ayahito, was the 120th emperor of Japan according to the traditional order of succession. Ninkō's reign spanned the years from 1817 until his death in 1846, and saw further deterioration of the power of the ruling shōgun. Disasters, which included famine, combined with corruption and increasing Western interference, helped to erode public trust in the bakufu government. Emperor Ninkō revived certain court rituals and practices upon the wishes of his father. However, it is unknown what role, if any, the Emperor had in the turmoil which occurred during his reign.

His family included fifteen children from various concubines, but only three of them lived to adulthood. His fourth son, Imperial Prince Osahito, became Emperor Kōmei upon Ninkō's death in 1846. While political power at the time still resided with the shōgun, the beginnings of the bakumatsu (end of military government) were at hand.

== Events of Ninkō's life ==
=== Early life ===
Before Ninkō's ascension to the Chrysanthemum Throne, his personal name (imina) was Ayahito (恵仁). He was born on 16 March 1800 and was the fourth son of Emperor Kōkaku. He was the only child of sixteen others to survive into adulthood. Ayahito was named as crown prince in 1809, having been adopted by his father's chief wife Imperial Princess Yoshiko (欣子内親王), also known as Shin-Seiwa-in (新清和院). His birth mother was one of his father's concubines, Kajyūji Tadako (勧修寺婧子).

=== Reign ===
Prince Ayahito was enthroned as Emperor on 31 October 1817, after his father retired from the throne. Following his father the Retired Emperor's wishes, he attempted to revive certain court rituals and practices. These included, among other things, restoring the title tennō, which identified the Emperor. Among Ninkō's innovations was the establishment of the Gakushūsho (the predecessor of the Gakushūin) for the Court Nobility just outside the Imperial Palace. One major event during his reign was the Tenpō famine which lasted from 1833 to 1837. The famine was most severe in northern Honshū and was caused by flooding and cold weather.

Ninkō's reign also saw some deterioration of the Shōgun's power. Damage from the Tenpō famine and other concurring natural disasters shook the faith of the people in the ruling Shōgun. In 1837, Ōshio Heihachirō led a revolt in Osaka against corrupt officials who refused to help feed the impoverished residents of the city. That same year also had an incident take place where an American merchant vessel was driven away by coastal artillery. While order was eventually restored, long term resentment resonated with the commoners against the ruling government. It is unclear though what role, if any, the Emperor played during this period of unrest.

Emperor Ninkō died on 21 February 1846 and was enshrined in the Imperial mausoleum, Nochi no Tsukinowa no Higashiyama no misasagi (後月輪東山陵), which is at Sennyū-ji in Higashiyama-ku, Kyoto. Also enshrined in Tsuki no wa no misasagi, at Sennyū-ji are this Emperor's immediate Imperial predecessors since Emperor Go-Mizunoo – Meishō, Go-Kōmyō, Go-Sai, Reigen, Higashiyama, Nakamikado, Sakuramachi, Momozono, Go-Sakuramachi, Go-Momozono and Kōkaku. The shrine complex also encompasses the misasagi of Ninkō's immediate successor – Kōmei. Empress Dowager Yoshikō is also entombed at this Imperial mausoleum complex.

== Eras and Kugyō ==
The years of Ninkō's reign are more specifically identified by more than one era name or nengō. While Kugyō (公卿) is a collective term for the very few most powerful men attached to the court of the Emperor of Japan in pre-Meiji eras. Even during those years in which the court's actual influence outside the palace walls was minimal, the hierarchic organization persisted.

The following eras occurred during Ninkō's reign:

- Bunka (1804–1818)
- Bunsei (1818–1830)
- Tenpō (1830–1844)
- Kōka (1844–1848)

During Ninkō's reign, this apex of the Daijō-kan included:

- Kampaku, Ichijō Tadayoshi, 1814–1823
- Kampaku, Takatsukasa Masamichi, 1823–1856
- Sadaijin
- Udaijin
- Naidaijin
- Dainagon

== Genealogy ==
Emperor Ninkō's family included seven sons and eight daughters from various concubines, but only the future Emperor Komei (Komei-tennō), Princess Sumiko (Sumiko-naishinnō) and Princess Chikako (Chikako-naishinnō) survived beyond childhood.

=== Spouse ===
Position	Name	Birth	Death	Father	Issue
Kōgō	Takatsukasa Tsunako (鷹司繋子) later Shinkokamon'in (新皇嘉門院)	1798	1823	Takatsukasa Masahiro	• First Son: Imperial Prince Yasuhito (b. 1820) • First daughter: Princess Jihishin’in (b. 1823)
Nyōgo	Takatsukasa Yasuko (鷹司祺子) later Shinsakuheimon'in (新朔平門院)	1811	1847	Takatsukasa Masahiro	• Fourth Daughter: Princess Maninshu’in (b. 1829)

=== Concubines ===
Name	Birth	Death	Father	Issue
Ogimachi Naoko (正親町雅子) later Shintaikemon'in (新待賢門院)	1803	1856	Ogimachi Sanemitsu	• Second Son: Prince Yo (b. 1825) • Fourth Son: Imperial Prince Osahito (later Emperor Komei) (b. 1831) • Sixth Son: Imperial Prince Katsura-no-Miya Misahito (b. 1833) • Seventh Daughter: Princess Kyo (b. 1837)
Kanroji Kiyoko (甘露寺妍子)	1806	1861	Kanroji Kuninaga	• Second Daughter: Princess Nori (b. 1823) • Third Daughter: Imperial Princess Katsura-no-Miya Sumiko (b. 1829) • Third Son: San-no-miya (b. 1830) • Fifth Daughter: Princess So (b. 1832) • Sixth Daughter: Princess Tsune (b. 1836)
Hashimoto Tsuneko (橋本経子) later Kangyou'in (観行院)	1826	1865	Hashimoto Sanehisa	• Seventh Prince: Prince Tane (b. 1844) • Eighth Daughter: Imperial Princess Kazu-no-miya Chikako (b. 1846)
Nakayama Isako (中山績子)	1795	1875	Nakayama Naruchika	None
Imaki Haruko (今城媋子)	1809	1875	Imaki Sadanori	• Fifth son: Prince Jōjakkō-in (b. 1832)

=== Issue ===
Status	Name	Birth	Death	Mother	Marriage	Issue
First Son	Imperial Prince Yasuhito (安仁親王)	1820	1821	Takatsukasa Tsunako	—N/a	—N/a
First Daughter	Princess Jihishin’in (慈悲心院宮) (Stillbirth)	1823	1823	Takatsukasa Tsunako	—N/a	—N/a
Second Son	Prince Yo (鎔宮)	1825	1826	Ogimachi Naoko	—N/a	—N/a
Second Daughter	Princess Nori (成宮)	1825	1826	Kanroji Kiyoko	—N/a	—N/a
Third Daughter	Imperial Princess Katsura-no-Miya Sumiko (桂宮淑子内親王)	1829	1881	Kanroji Kiyoko	—N/a	—N/a
Fourth Daughter	Princess Maninshu’in (摩尼珠院宮)	1829	1831	Takatsukasa Yasuko	—N/a	—N/a
Third Son	San-no-miya (三宮)	1830	1831	Kanroji Kiyoko	—N/a	—N/a
Fourth Son	Imperial Prince Osahito (統仁親王) (Emperor Komei)	1831	1867	Ogimachi Naoko	Asako Kujō	Mutsuhito
Fifth son	Prince Jōjakkō-in (常寂光院宮) (Stillbirth)	1832	1832	Imaki Haruko	—N/a	—N/a
Fifth Daughter	Princess So (総宮)	1832	1833	Kanroji Kiyoko	—N/a	—N/a
Sixth Son	Imperial Prince Katsura-no-Miya Misahito (桂宮節仁親王)	1833	1836	Ogimachi Naoko	—N/a	—N/a
Sixth Daughter	Princess Tsune (経宮) (Stillbirth)	1836	1836	Kanroji Kiyoko	—N/a	—N/a
Seventh Daughter	Princess Kyo (恭宮)	1837	1838	Ogimachi Naoko	—N/a	—N/a
Seventh Son	Prince Tane (胤宮)	1844	1845	Hashimoto Tsuneko	—N/a	—N/a
Eighth Daughter	Imperial Princess Kazu-no-miya Chikako (和宮親子内親王)	1846	1877	Hashimoto Tsuneko	Tokugawa Iemochi	Tokugawa Iesato

== Ancestry ==
Ancestors of Emperor Ninkō

8. Prince of the Blood Kan'in-no-miya Naohito (1704–1753)
4. Prince of the Blood Kan'in-no-miya Sukehito (1733–1794)
9. Itō
2. Emperor Kōkaku (1771–1840)
10. Iwamuro Sōken (1713–1792)
5. Ōe Iwashiro (1744–1813)
11. Rin
1. Emperor Ninkō
12. Kanshūji Akimichi (1717–1756)
6. Kanshūji Tsunehaya (1748–1805)
13. Inaba
3. Kanshūji Tadako (1780–1843)

== See also ==
- Emperor of Japan
- List of Emperors of Japan
- Imperial cult
- Modern system of ranked Shinto Shrines

== Bibliography ==
- Meyer, Eva-Maria. (1999). Japans Kaiserhof in der Edo-Zeit: unter besonderer Berücksichtigung der Jahre 1846 bis 1867. Münster: LIT Verlag. ISBN 978-3-8258-3939-0; OCLC 42041594
- Ponsonby-Fane, Richard Arthur Brabazon. (1959). The Imperial House of Japan. Kyoto: Ponsonby Memorial Society. OCLC 194887
- Titsingh, Isaac. (1834). Nihon Ōdai Ichiran; ou, Annales des empereurs du Japon. Paris: Royal Asiatic Society, Oriental Translation Fund of Great Britain and Ireland. OCLC 5850691
- Varley, H. Paul. (1980). Jinnō Shōtōki: A Chronicle of Gods and Sovereigns. New York: Columbia University Press. ISBN 978-0-231-04940-5; OCLC 59145842

Regnal titles
Preceded by Emperor Kōkaku	Emperor of Japan: Ninkō; 1817–1846	Succeeded by Emperor Kōmei
