= Sanda ware =

Type of Japanese pottery

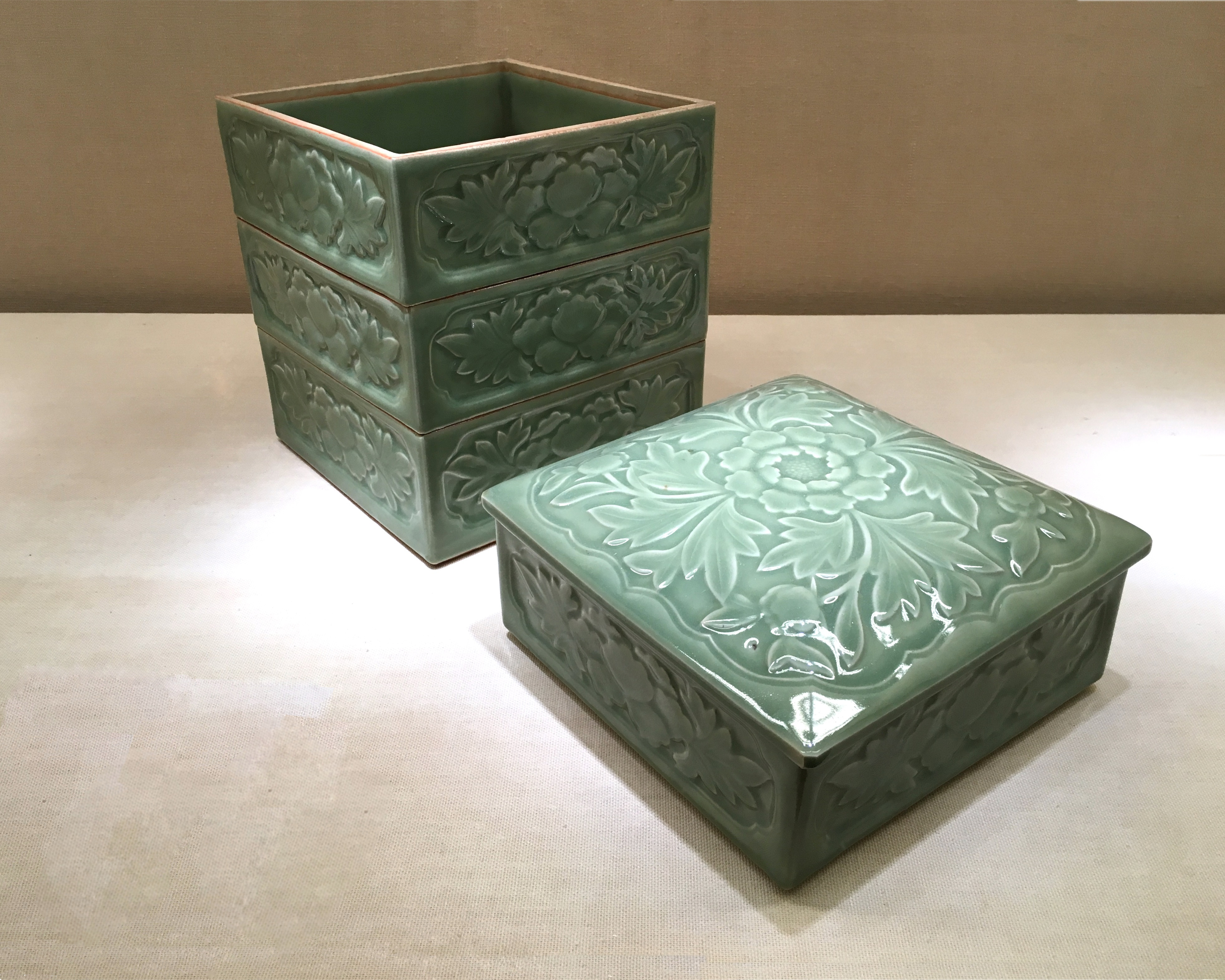
Sanda ware celadon tired boxes, peony design. Edo period, 19th century

Sanda ware (三田焼 Sanda-yaki) is a type of Japanese pottery.

The pottery kiln opened around the middle of the Edo period and was completed during the Kansei era by Uchida Chūbe (内田忠兵衛 1789–1840). During the Bakumatsu years, Kinkodō Kisuke (欽古堂亀祐 1765–1837) was invited from Kyoto and led the kiln to a prosperous era.
