= Bunka =

Period of Japanese history (1804–1818)

Bunka (文化, culture) was a Japanese era name (年号, nengō; lit. 'year name') after Kyōwa and before Bunsei. The period spanned the years from January 1804 to April 1818. The reigning emperors were Kōkaku-tennō (光格天皇) and Ninkō-Tennō (仁孝天皇).

== Change of era ==
- February 11, 1804 (Bunka gannen (文化元年)): The new era name of Bunka ( meaning "Culture" or "Civilization") was created to mark the start of a new 60-year cycle of the Heavenly Stem and Earthly Branch system of the Chinese calendar which was on New Year's Day, the new moon day of 2 November 1804. The previous era ended and a new one commenced in Kyōwa 4.

== Events of the Bunka era ==
- 1804 (Bunka 1): Daigaku-no-kami Hayashi Jussai (1768–1841) explained the shogunate foreign policy to Emperor Kōkaku in Kyoto.
- June 1805 (Bunka 2): Genpaku Sugita (1733–1817) is granted an audience with Shōgun Ienari to explain differences between traditional medical knowledge and Western medical knowledge.
- September 25, 1810 (Bunka 7, 27th day of the 8th month): Earthquake in northern Honshū (Latitude: 39.900/Longitude: 139.900), 6.6 magnitude on the Surface wave magnitude scale....Click link for NOAA/Japan: Significant Earthquake Database
- December 7, 1812 (Bunka 9, 4th day of the 11th month): Earthquake in Honshū (Latitude: 35.400/Longitude: 139.600), 6.6 magnitude.
- 1817 (Bunka 14): Emperor Kōkaku travelled in procession to Sento Imperial Palace, a palace of an abdicated emperor. The Sento Palace at that time was called Sakura Machi Palace. It had been built by the Tokugawa Shogunate for former-Emperor Go-Mizunoo.

== Notes ==
Preceded by Kyōwa (享和)	Era or nengō Bunka (文化); 1804–1818	Succeeded by Bunsei (文政)
