= Princess Yoshiko (consort of Kōkaku) =

Yoshiko

Empress consort of Japan
- Tenure: 1780–1817

Empress dowager of Japan
- Tenure: 1820–1841
- Born: 11 March 1779
- Died: 11 August 1846 (aged 67)
- Burial: Senyū-ji
- Spouse: Emperor Kōkaku (m. 1794; died 1840)
- Issue: Prince Masuhito; Prince Toshihito
Names
- Yoshikō (欣子)
- House: Imperial House of Japan
- Father: Emperor Go-Momozono
- Mother: Konoe Koreko
- Religion: Shinto (before 1816); Buddhism (after 1816)

Princess Yoshiko (欣子内親王, Yoshiko-naishinnō; 11 March 1779 – 11 August 1846) was the empress consort of Emperor Kōkaku of Japan. She enjoys the distinction of being the last daughter of an emperor who would herself rise to the position of empress. When she was later given the title of Empress Dowager, she became the first person to be honored with that title while still living since 1168.

== Early life ==
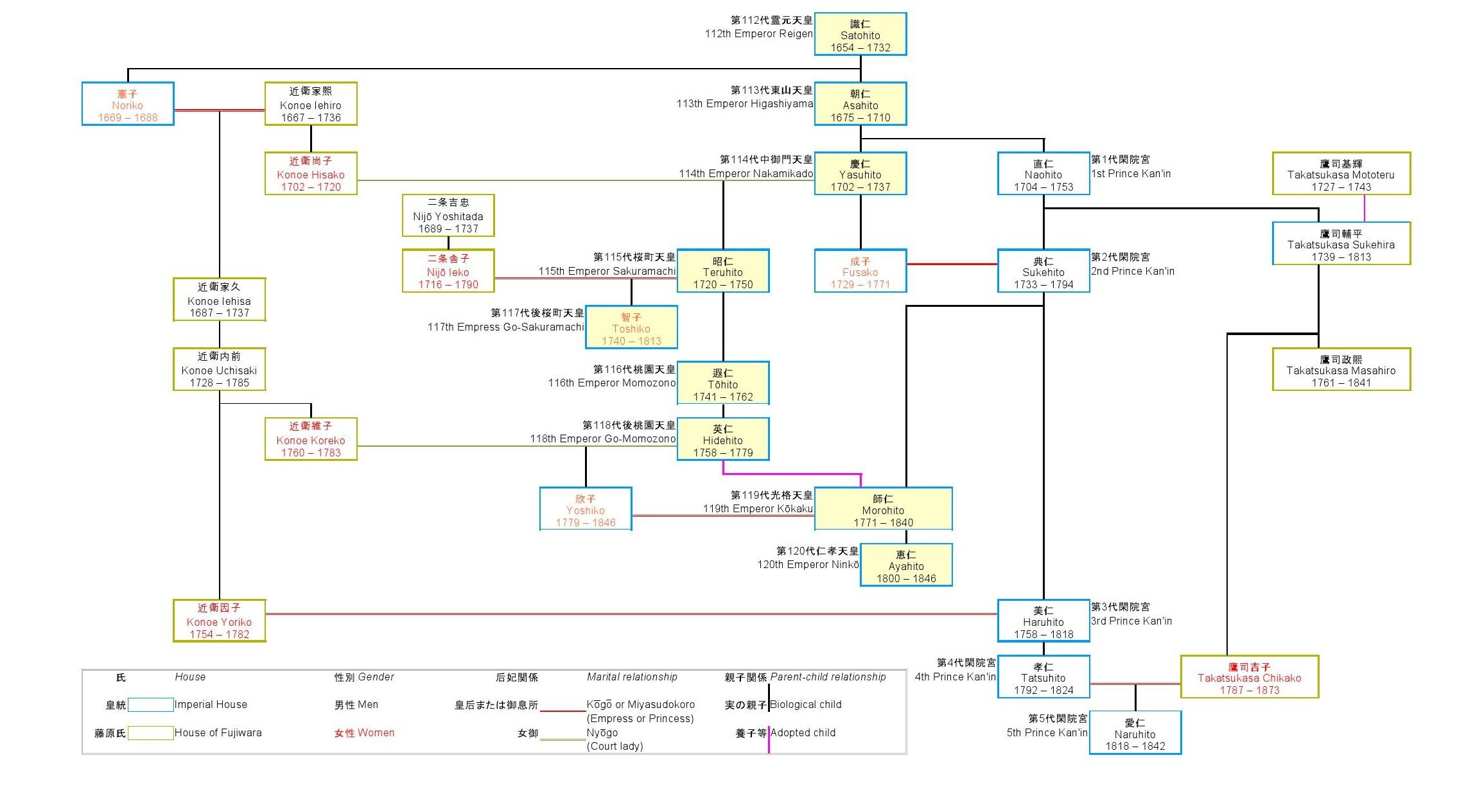
Genealogical chart for Empress Yoshikō.

Princess Yoshiko (欣子内親王, Yoshiko naishinnō) was also known as Onna-Ichi-no-Miya (女一宮, Onna-ichi-no-Miya) in her infancy. She was the only child of Emperor Go-Momozono; and she became the wife of the Emperor's adopted heir, marrying her adoptive brother who would later be known as Emperor Kōkaku. Although her own children died in infancy, she functioned as official mother to the heir who would become Emperor Ninkō.

=== Family relationships ===
- Father: Emperor Go-Momozono of Japan (5 August 1758 – 16 December 1779), 118th Emperor of Japan
- Mother: Konoe Koreko (26 January 1760 – 6 November 1783), daughter of Konoe Uchisaki
- Husband and adopted brother: Emperor Kōkaku of Japan (23 September 1771 – 11 December 1840), 119th Emperor of Japan, Yoshiko's second cousin twice removed in the biological male line
- Children: Prince Masuhito (15 February 1800 – 27 April 1800) and Prince Toshihito (25 February 1816 – 14 March 1821)

== Empress consort ==
Yoshiko's father, Emperor Go-Momozono, died without a son when she was ten months old. To avoid dynastic interregnum, Retired Empress Go-Sakuramachi and her chief adviser encouraged the dying emperor to adopt Prince Morohito, whose biological father was Prince Sukehito, the second Prince Kan'in. Morohito, who would be known as Emperor Kōkaku later, acceded to the throne at age eight.

Retired Empress Go-Sakuramachi engaged Yoshiko to the new Emperor. Yoshiko formally became Empress consort to Emperor Kōkaku at age 15. She bore two sons, both of whom died in infancy.

== Empress dowager ==
In 1816, Emperor Ninkō granted Empress Yoshiko the title of Empress Dowager after Emperor Kōkaku abdicated.

== Buddhist nun ==
Shortly after Emperor Kōkaku's death, Dowager Empress Yoshiko became a Buddhist nun. In 1841, she changed her name to Shin-Seiwa-In (新清和院, Shin-seiwa-in).

Yoshiko died at age 67 and was buried Senyū-ji, which is in Higashiyama-ku, Kyoto. Her memory is officially honored at her husband's mausoleum, which is known as Nochi-no-tsukinowa no misasagi.

== See also ==
- Japanese empresses
- Ōmiya Palace

== Notes ==
Japanese royalty
Preceded by Princess Yukiko	Empress consort of Japan; 1794–1816	Succeeded by Takatsukasa Tsunako (title granted posthumously)
Preceded by Konoe Koreko	Empress dowager of Japan; 1820–1841	Succeeded by Takatsukasa Yasuko
