= Kyōwa =

Period of Japanese history (1801–1804)

Kyōwa (享和) was a Japanese era name (年号, nengō, lit. "year name") after Kansei and before Bunka. This period spanned the years from February 1801 through February 1804. The reigning emperor was Kōkaku-tennō (光格天皇).

== Change of era ==
- February 5, 1801 (Kyōwa gannen (享和元年)): a new era name was created because of the belief that the 58th year of every cycle of the Chinese zodiac brings great changes. The previous era ended and a new one commenced in Kansei 13.

The new era name was drawn from an hortatory aphorism: "Follow Heaven and take your destiny, unite all people and perfect your righteousness" (順乎天而享其運、応乎人而和其義).

== Events of the Kyōwa era ==
- December 9, 1802 (Kyōwa 2, 15th day of the 11th month): Earthquake in northwest Honshū and Sado Island (Latitude: 37.700/Longitude: 138.300), 6.6 magnitude on the Richter Scale.
- December 28, 1802 (Kyōwa 2, 4th day of the 12th month): Earthquake on Sado Island (Latitude: 38.000/Longitude: 138.000).

== Notes ==
Preceded by Kansei (寛政)	Era or nengō Kyōwa (享和); 1801–1804	Succeeded by Bunka (文化)
