= Princess Sumiko =

Sumiko 桂宮淑子内親王
- Princess Katsura

Head of the Katsura-no-miya
- Reign: 1863–1881
- Predecessor: Prince Katsura Misahito
- Successor: Line extinct
- Born: February 22, 1829; Yamashiro Province
- Died: October 3, 1881 (aged 52); Kyoto Prefecture
- Burial: October 20, 1881; Sennyū-ji
- House: Imperial House of Japan
- Father: Emperor Ninkō
- Mother: Kanroji Kiyoko

Sumiko, Princess Katsura (桂宮淑子内親王, Katsura-no-miya Sumiko naishin'nō) was a Japanese princess. She was the head of the Katsura-no-miya from 1863 until 1881. She was the last woman born a princess to lead a branch of the imperial family until Princess Akiko of Mikasa in September 2025.

== Life ==
Sumiko was the daughter of Emperor Ninkō and his lady-in-waiting, Kanroji Kiyoko. She was the elder half-sister of Chikako, Princess Kazu and Emperor Kōmei. On May 3, 1840, she was engaged with her cousin Prince Kan'in Naruhito; she officially became an imperial princess on October 18, 1842, to make way for her marriage. Two days later, however, Prince Naruhito died before they were married. Afterwards, Princess Sumiko remained unmarried until her death.

In 1863, she succeeded to the head of the Katsura-no-miya house in her own right after the eleventh head, Prince Katsura Misahito, her younger half-brother who died in 1836. The Katsura-no-miya house was one of the four shinnōke, branches of the Imperial Family of Japan which were eligible to succeed to the Chrysanthemum Throne in the event that the main line should die out. This was a very unusual position for a woman.

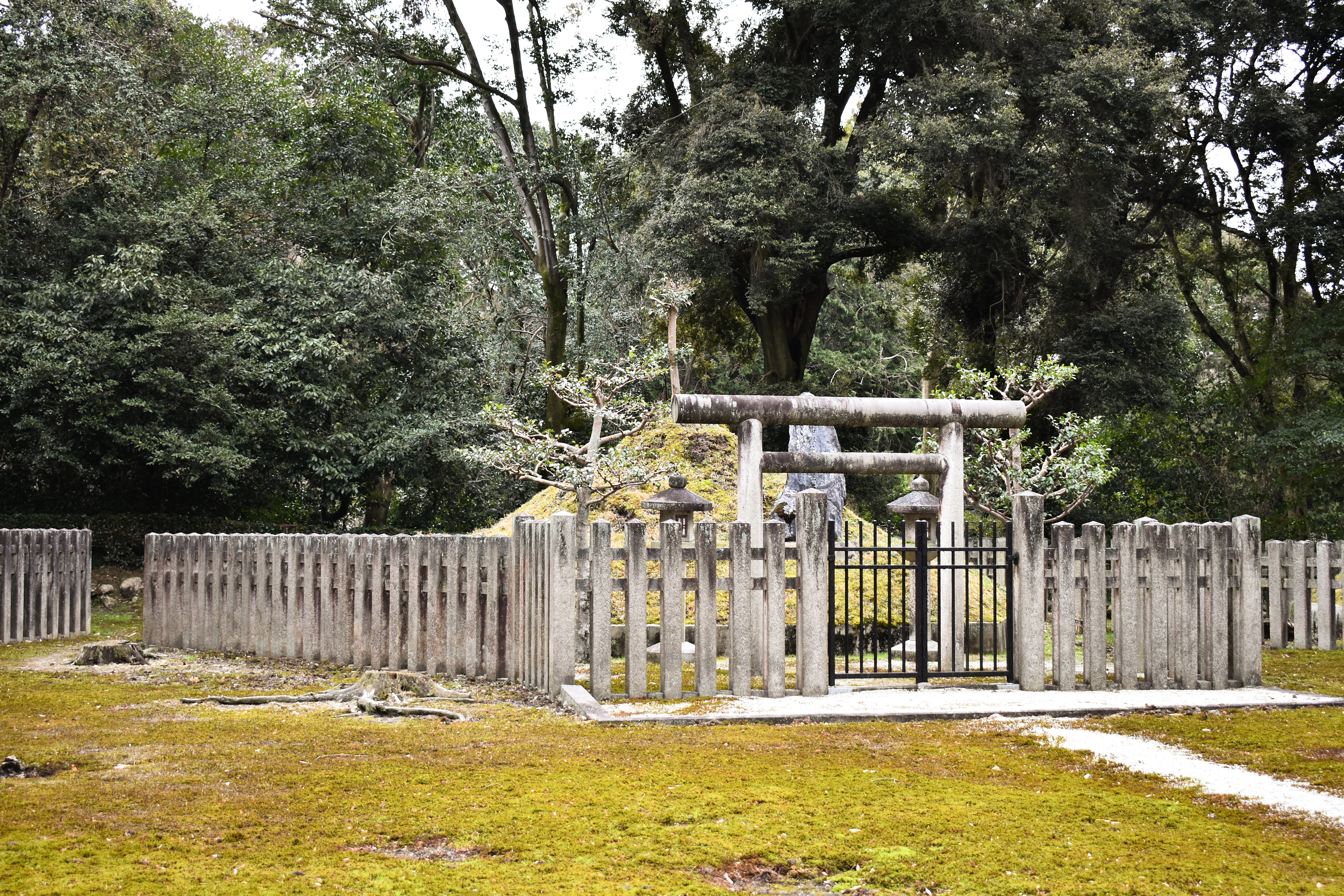
Her grave in Sennyū-ji

She died in 1881 on October 3, and with her, so did the Katsura-no-miya line of the Imperial family. She is buried in Senyū-ji.
