= Ichijō Tadayoshi =

Japanese kugyō (court noble)

Ichijō Tadayoshi (一条 忠良; May 2, 1774 – July 5, 1837), son of regent Teruyoshi, was a Japanese kugyō (court noble) of the Edo period (1603–1868). He held a regent position kampaku from 1814 to 1823. His wife was a daughter of Hosokawa Narishige, eighth head of Kumamoto Domain.

== Family ==
- Father: Ichijo Teruyoshi
- Mother: Tokugawa Atsuko
- Wife: Hosokawa Tomiko
- Children:
  - Ichijō Sanemichi (1788-1805) by Tomiko
  - Hideko (1825-1850) married Tokugawa Iesada by Tomiko
  - Ichijō Tadaka (1812-1863) by Tomiko
  - Koga Takemichi (1815-1903) by Tomiko
  - Tomoko married Ikeda Nariteru by Tomiko
  - Michiko married Matsudaira Yorisato by Tomiko
  - Takako married Takatsukasa Sukehiro by Tomiko
