= Ichijō Michika =

Japanese kugyō (court noble)

Ichijō Michika (一条 道香; November 18, 1722 – October 4, 1769), son of regent Kaneka, was a Japanese kugyō (court noble) of the Edo period (1603–1868). He held regent positions kampaku from 1746 to 1747 and from 1755 to 1757, and sesshō from 1747 to 1755.

He married an adopted daughter of Ikeda Tsugumasa, third head of Okayama Domain. She gave birth to, among others, Ichijō Teruyoshi and a daughter who later became a consort of Tokugawa Harumori, sixth head of Mito Domain

== Family ==
- Father: Ichijo Kaneka
- Mother: commoner
- Wife: Ikeda Shizuko
- Children:
  - Ichijo Teruyoshi by Shizuko
  - Yoshiko married Tokugawa Harumori by Shizuko
  - Sadako married Koga Nobumichi by Shizuko
  - Priestess in Sanbō-in by Shizuko
  - 2 daughters and 4 sons died in infancy by Shizuko
