= Hosokawa Narishige =

Japanese samurai daimyō

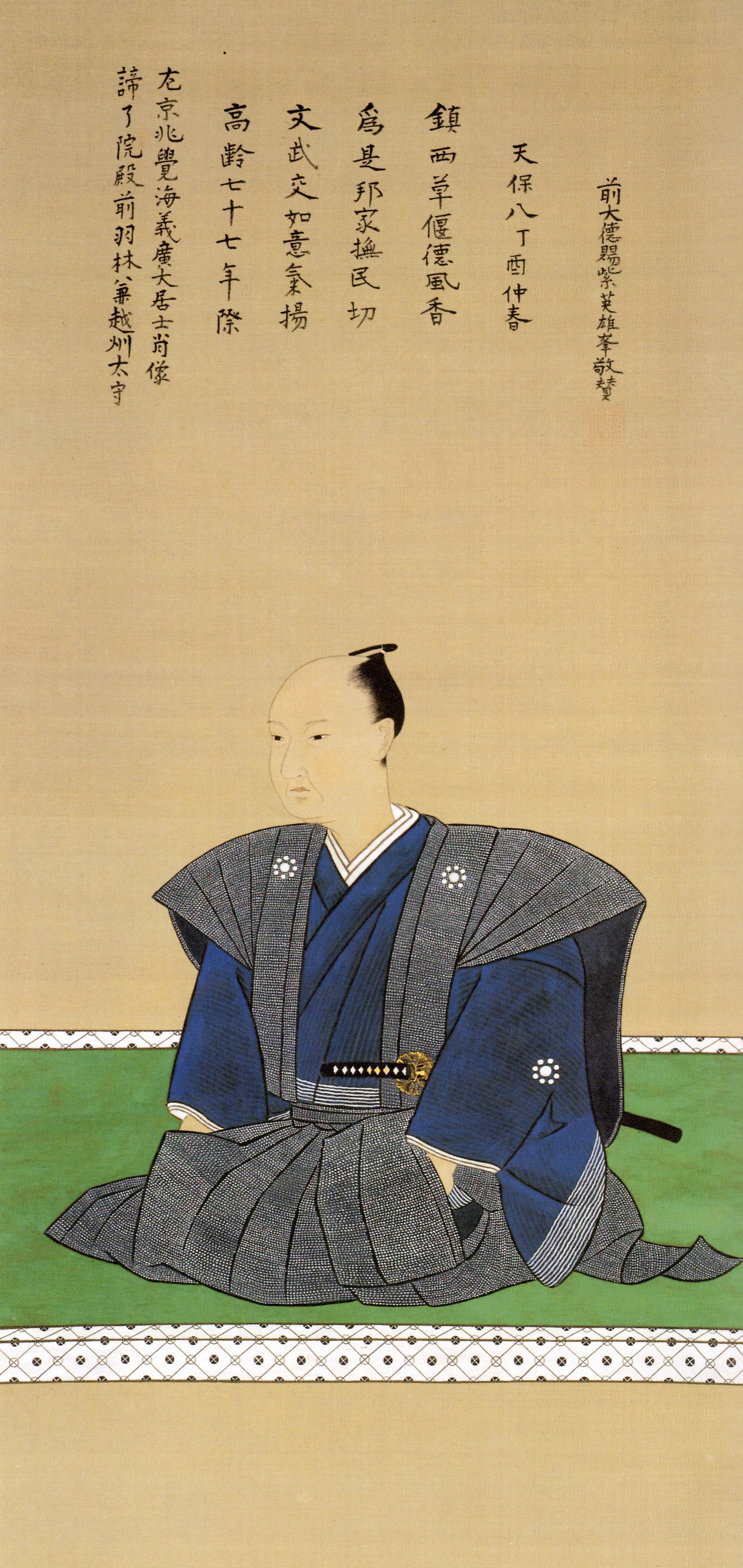

Hosokawa Narishige (細川斉茲; June 5, 1755 – December 12, 1835), also known as Hosokawa Tatsuhiro (細川立禮), was a Japanese samurai daimyō in the Edo period.

== Daimyo ==
Narishige was head of the Uto Domain (30,000 koku) in Higo Province and head of a cadet branch of the Hosokawa clan.
