= Ichijō Teruyoshi =

Japanese kugyō (court noble)

Ichijō Teruyoshi (一条 輝良; November 28, 1756 – November 25, 1795), son of regent Michika, was a Japanese kugyō (court noble) of the Edo period (1603–1868). He held a regent position kampaku from 1791 to 1795. His wife was a daughter of the eighth head of Wakayama Domain Tokugawa Shigenori. The couple had one daughter and two sons: Ichijō Tadayoshi, and another who was adopted by Saionji family and became known as 西園寺 実韶.

== Family ==
- Father: Ichijo Michika
- Mother: Ikeda Shizuko
- Wife: Tokugawa Atsuko
- Children:
  - Ichijo Tadayoshi by Atsuko
  - Saionji Sanetsugu (1778-1787) by Atsuko
  - Kazuko married Sanjo Ukinosa by Atsuko
  - Teruko married Prince Fushimi-no-miya Sadayuki by Atsuko
