= Kansei =

Period of Japanese history (1789–1801)

Kansei (寛政) was a Japanese era name (年号, nengō; "year name") after Tenmei and before Kyōwa. This period spanned the years from January 1789 through February 1801. The reigning emperor was Kōkaku-tennō (光格天皇).

== Change of era ==
- 1789 Kansei gannen (寛政元年): The new era name of Kansei (meaning "Tolerant Government" or "Broad-minded Government") was created to mark a number of calamities, including a devastating fire at the Imperial Palace. The previous era ended and a new one commenced in Tenmei 9, on the 25th day of the 1st month.

== Events of the Kansei era ==
The broad panoply of changes and new initiatives of the Tokugawa shogunate during this era became known as the Kansei Reforms.

Matsudaira Sadanobu (1759–1829) was named the shōgun's chief councilor (rōjū) in the summer of 1787; and early in the next year, he became the regent for the 11th shōgun, Tokugawa Ienari. As the chief administrative decision-maker in the bakufu hierarchy, he was in a position to effect radical change; and his initial actions represented an aggressive break with the recent past. Sadanobu's efforts were focused on strengthening the government by reversing many of the policies and practices which had become commonplace under the regime of the previous shōgun, Tokugawa Ieharu. These reform policies could be interpreted as a reactionary response to the excesses of his rōjū predecessor, Tanuma Okitsugu (1719–1788); and the result was that the Tanuma-initiated, liberalizing reforms within the bakufu and the relaxation of sakoku (Japan's "closed-door" policy of strict control of foreign merchants) were reversed or blocked.

- 1790 (Kansei 2): Sadanobu and the shogunate promulgate an edict addressed to Hayashi Kinpō, the rector of the Edo Confucian Academy -- "The Kansei Prohibition of Heterodox Studies" (kansei igaku no kin). The decree banned certain publications and enjoined strict observance of Neo-Confucian doctrine, especially with regard to the curriculum of the official Hayashi school.
- 1798 (Kansei 10): Kansei Calendar Revision

== Notes ==
Preceded by Tenmei (天明)	Era or nengō Kansei (寛政); 1789–1801	Succeeded by Kyōwa (享和)
