= Katsuyama =

Katsuyama may refer to:

- Katsuyama, Fukui, a city located in Fukui Prefecture, Japan
- Katsuyama, Fukuoka, a town located in Miyako District, Fukuoka Prefecture, Japan
- Katsuyama, Okayama, a town located in Maniwa District, Okayama Prefecture, Japan
- Katsuyama, Yamanashi, a town located in Minamitsuru District, Yamanashi Prefecture, Japan
- Brad Katsuyama (born 1978), financial services executive IEX, the Investors Exchange
- Katsuyama Eiheiji Line, a railway line in Fukui Prefecture
- Katsuyama Station, in Katsuyama, Fukui Prefecture
