= Echizen-Katsuyama Domain =

Feudal domain of the Tokugawa shogunate

Echizen-Katsuyama Domain 越前勝山藩
- under Tokugawa shogunate Japan
- 1613–1871
- Capital: Katsuyama Castle
- Area
  - Coordinates: 36°3′39.82″N 136°30′1.66″E
  - Type: Daimyō
- Historical era: Edo period
  - Split from Fukui Domain: 1613
  - Matsudaira: 1624
  - Ogasawara: 1691
  - Disestablished: 1871
- Today part of: Fukui Prefecture

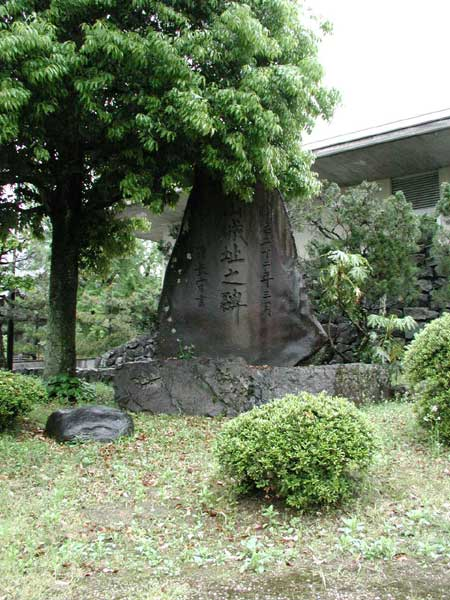
Monument on the site of Katsuyama Castle

Katsuyama Domain (越前勝山藩, Katsuyama-han) was a feudal domain under the Tokugawa shogunate of Edo period Japan. It was based at Katsuyama Castle in eastern Echizen Province in what is now the city of Katsuyama in Fukui Prefecture. It was ruled during most if its history by a cadet branch of the Ogasawara clan.

== History ==
After the Battle of Sekigahara in 1600, Tokugawa Ieyasu awarded Echizen Province to his second son, Yūki Hideyasu as a 690,000 koku domain. Hideyasu assigned the area to Hayashi Sadatada as a 9800 koku fief; however, Hayashi was dispossessed in 1612 by Hideyasu's son, Matsudaira Tadanao. Tadanao was in turn dispossessed by the Tokugawa shogunate in 1623, and Fukui Domain was divided, with Yūki Hideyasu's 5th son, Matsudaira Naomoto receiving a 30,000 koku domain centered at Katsuyama. This marked the start of Katsuyama Domain, although initially it was somewhat ambiguous as to whether or not Katsuyama was independent, or a subsidiary of Fukui Domain. In 1635, Matsudaira Naomoto was transferred to neighbouring Ōno Domain, and his younger brother, Matsudaira Naoyoshi became daimyō. In 1644, he was also transferred to Ōno Domain, and Katsuyama Domain became extinct. In 1686, its territories were transferred from Fukui Domain to the shogunate, and it became tenryō territory.

In 1691, Katsuyama Domain was restored as a 22,000 koku holding for Ogasawara Sadanobu, formerly of Takasu Domain in Mino Province. The Ogasawara clan continued to rule Katsuyama until the end of the Edo period, suffering from more than ten peasant uprisings brought about by famine, natural disasters and crop failure.

During the Boshin War of the Meiji restoration, Katsuyama Domain quickly sided with the new government, and was assigned to the policing of Kyoto in 1868. In 1869, the 8th (and final) Ogasawara daimyō, Ogasawara Nagamori became imperial governor until the abolition of the han system in July 1871.

== Holdings at the end of the Edo period ==
Like most domains in the han system, Katsuyama consisted of several discontinuous territories calculated to provide the assigned kokudaka, based on periodic cadastral surveys and projected agricultural yields,

- Echizen Province
  - 52 villages in Ōno District

== List of daimyō ==
#	Name	Tenure	Courtesy title	Court Rank	kokudaka
Matsudaira clan (shinpan) 1624–1695
1	Matsudaira Naomoto (松平（結城）直基)	1624–1635	Yamato-no-kami (大和守); Jijū ( 侍従)	Junior 4th Rank, Lower Grade (従四位下 )	30,000 koku
2	Matsudaira Naoyoshi (松平直良)	1635–1644	Tosa-no-kami (土佐守); Jijū ( 侍従)	Junior 4th Rank, Lower Grade (従四位下)	35,000 koku
tenryō 1644-1691
Ogasawara clan, 1691-1871 (fudai)
1	Ogasawara Sadanobu (小笠原貞信)	1691-1702	Tosa-no-kami (土佐守) )	Junior 5th Rank, Lower Grade (従五位下 )	22,000 koku
2	Ogasawara Nobutoki (小笠原信辰)	1702-1721	Suruga-no-kami (駿河守) )	Junior 5th Rank, Lower Grade (従五位下 )	22,000 koku
3	Ogasawara Nobunari (小笠原信成)	1721–1730	Noto-no-kami ( 能登守) )	Junior 5th Rank, Lower Grade (従五位下)	22,000 koku
4	Ogasawara Nobutane (小笠原信胤)	1730–1745	Sagami-no-kami ( 相模守) )	Junior 5th Rank, Lower Grade (従五位下)	22,000 koku
5	Ogasawara Nobufusa (小笠原信房)	1745–1780	Hida-no-kami ( 飛騨守) )	Junior 5th Rank, Lower Grade (従五位下)	22,000 koku
6	Ogasawara Nobumichi (小笠原長教)	1780–1799	Sagami-no-kami ( 相模守) )	Junior 5th Rank, Lower Grade (従五位下)	22,000 koku
7	Ogasawara Nagataka (小笠原長貴)	1799–1840	Sagami-no-kami ( 相模守) )	Junior 5th Rank, Lower Grade (従五位下)	22,000 koku
8	Ogasawara Nagamori (小笠原長守)	1840–1871	Sagami-no-kami ( 相模守) )	Junior 5th Rank, Lower Grade (従五位下)	22,000 koku

=== Ogasawara Sadanobu ===
Ogasawara Sadanobu (小笠原貞信; September 20, 1631-July 28, 1714) was an Edo period daimyō. He was the son of Takagi Sadakatsu, a kōtai yoriai official within the shogunate administration and was born in Mino Province. As his mother was a daughter of Ogasawara Nobuyuki, he was adopted as heir to Sekiyado Domain, becoming daimyō in 1640. However, as he was only 10 years old at the time, the shogunate decided that he was too young for such an important post, and transferred him to Takasu Domain two months later. In 1691, he was transferred to the newly revived Echizen-Katsuyama Domain. He served as Osaka Kaban from 1692-1693. The posting proved to be expensive, and he attempted to raise taxes in the domain to compensate. This resulted in a peasant's revolt and rioting for several years, with a delegation from the domain even appearing in Edo in 1697 to take their complaint to higher authorities. Sadanobu was forced to relent. he retired in 1702 to the clan residence in Honjō, but continued to meddle in clan government and affair, creating great confusion and disturbance to his death in 1702. His wife was the daughter of Ogasawara Masanobu. His graves are at the temple of Kaizen-ji in Taitō, Tokyo and the temple of Kaizen-ji in Katsuyama.

=== Ogasawara Nobutoki ===
Ogasawara Nobutoki (笠原信辰; March 10, 1686-April 8, 1736) was the 2nd daimyō of Echizen-Katsuyama Domain. He was born as the eldest son of Ogasawara Nobuyuki, the youngest son of Ogasawara Sadanobu, and became daimyō in 1702 on the retirement of his grandfather. However, his grandfather continued to meddle in domain affairs even after retirement, resulting in conflicting instructions and orders, and dividing the domain's retainers into factions which were at continual conflict. He served as Osaka Kaban in 1703, 1706, 1711 and 1715, and also faced the addition expense of rebuilding the domain's Edo residence after a fire. He fell ill in 1719 and was unable to handle domain affairs, and in 1721 retired in favor of his son, taking the tonsure and the name of Kawachi Nyūdō (河内入道), He retired to Shiroyama onsen, and died in 1736. His wife was the daughter of Mizuno Tadanao of Matsumoto Domain. His grave is at the temple of Kaizen-ji in Katsuyama.

=== Ogasawara Nobunari ===
Ogasawara Nobunari (小笠原信成; July 2, 1705-August 27, 1730) was the 3rd daimyō of Echizen-Katsuyama Domain. He was born in Edo as the hatamoto grandson of Sakai Tadatsugu and was adopted by Ogasawara Nobutoki as heir in 1720. He became daimyō in 1721. He served as Osaka Kaban in 1724 and 1727; in 1726 a volcanic eruption caused crop failure and massive damage in the Katsuyama area, and while struggling with recovery, he was appointed Osaka Kaban again in 1730. Unable to cope with these pressures, he fell ill and died in 1730 without heir.

=== Ogasawara Nobutane ===
Ogasawara Nobutane (小笠原信胤; January 12, 1716-July 28, 1745) was the 4th daimyō of Echizen-Katsuyama Domain. he was the second son of Honda Tadamune of Ise-Kanbe Domain, and was posthumously adopted as heir to the childless Ogasawara Nobunari, becoming daimyō in 1730. He underwent his genpuku ceremony in 1731. However, due to his youth, internal political factions within the domain, and the severe financial situation, he proved unable to handle the responsibilities of his office, and died of illness in 1745. His wife was the granddaughter of Nagai Naonobu of Iwatsuki Domain, but he died without heir.

=== Ogasawara Nobufusa ===
'Ogasawara Nobufusa’ (小笠原信房; March 26, 1733-February 19, 1794) was the 5th daimyō of Echizen-Katsuyama Domain. He was eldest son of Ogasawara Nobutoki, but had been bypassed in the succession and was adopted as posthumous heir to Ogasawara Nobutake, becoming daimyō in 1745. However, he was only 13-years-old and had poor health, and left domain affairs largely in the hands of senior retainers, who were forced to reduce taxation in 1771 due to peasant revolts. He fell ill in 1775, and resigned in 1780, retiring to Shiroyama Onsen where he died in 1762.

=== Ogasawara Nobumichi ===
'Ogasawara Nobumichi’ (小笠原長教; May 26, 1760-April 14, 1799) was the 6th daimyō of Echizen-Katsuyama Domain. He was eldest son of Ogasawara Nobufusa and became daimyō in 1780 on the retirement of his father due to illness. He codified the laws of the domain and attempted economic reforms by implementing a fiscal austerity program. However, these efforts were thwarted when the Katsuyama jōkamachi burned down in 1781 and the Great Tenmei famine hit the domain in 1783. Further, the domain's shimoyashiki in Edo burned down in 1786, and severe storms caused crop failure in 1791. A massive uprising occurred in 1797. He died in Edo in 1799 at the age of 40. His wife was a daughter of Nakagawa Hisasada of Oka Domain.

=== Ogasawara Nagataka ===
'Ogasawara Nagataka’ (小笠原長貴; August 12, 1793-April 10, 1840) was the 7th daimyō of Echizen-Katsuyama Domain. He was the eldest son of Ogasawara Nobumichi, and became daimyō on this father's death in 1799. Disaster continue to stalk the domain, with the Katsuyama jōkamachi (which had recently been rebuilt after a major fire in 1781) burning down again in 1799, and the domain's Edo residence burning down in 1803. In 1811, there was widespread famine in the domain due to crop failure, followed by a peasant's revolt in 1814. This was followed by the Tenpō famine of 1833-1837. Despite this background, he served as sōshaban in the shogunal administration in 1816, and from 1829 to 1840 as a wakadoshiyori under Shōgun Tokugawa Ieharu. His wife was a daughter of Sakai Tadahiro of Himeji Domain.

=== Ogasawara Nagamori ===
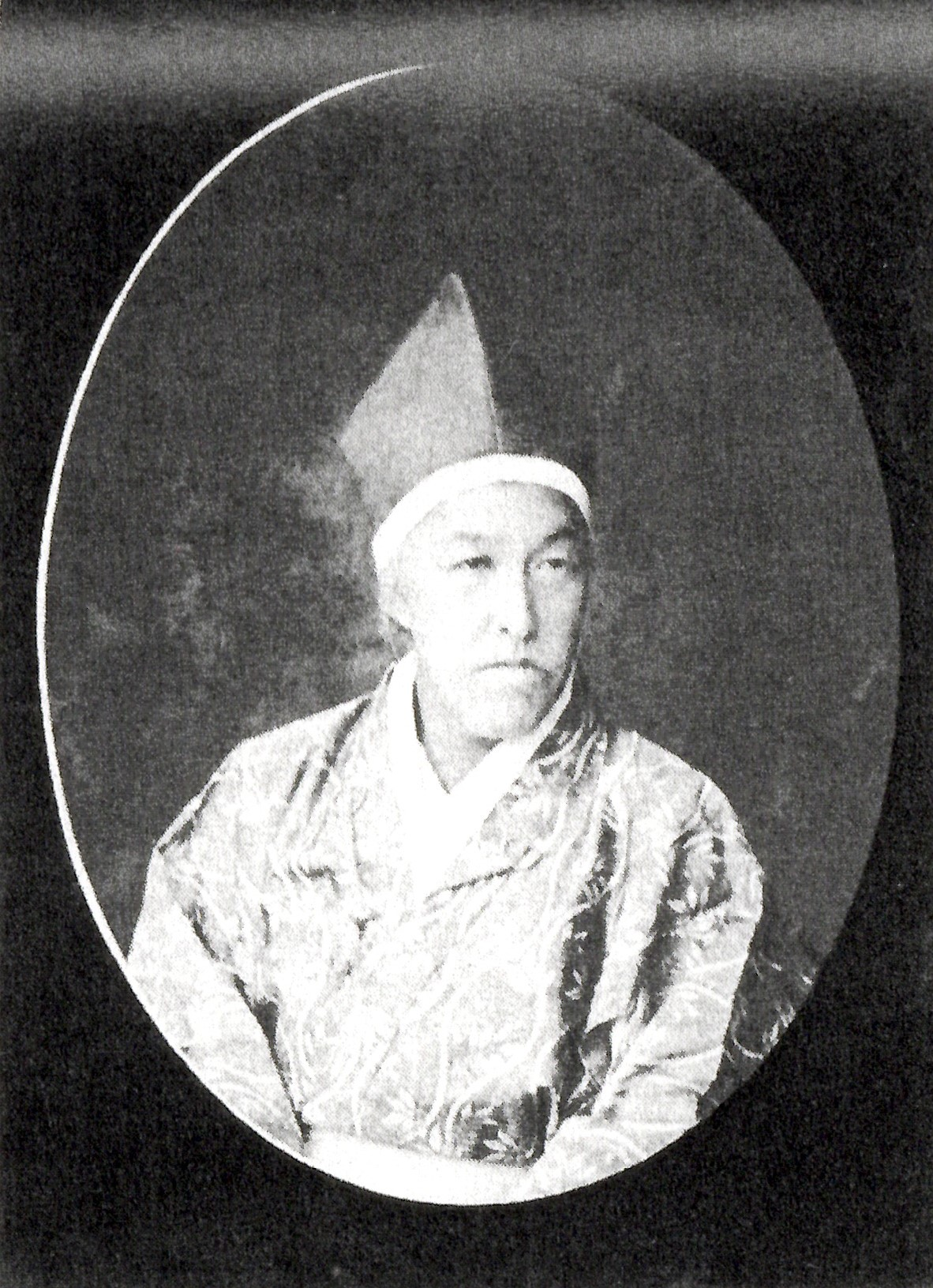
Ogasawara Nagamori

Ogasawara Nagamori (小笠原長守; August 29, 1834 - March 8, 1891) was the 8th (and final) daimyō of Echizen-Katsuyama Domain. He was the sixth son of Ogasawara Nagataka and became daimyō on his father's death in 1840. he was received in formal audience by Shōgun Tokugawa Ieyoshi in 1848. As he was underage at the time of his accession, the domain was run by senior retainers, who actively attempted to reform the domain governance and finances, encouraging new industries. A han school was founded in 1843, and the domain attempted to modernize its weaponry from 1848. These efforts were hindered by an order from the shogunate to contribute to flood control projects on rivers in the Kantō region and by damage caused by the Ansei great earthquakes of 1854-1855. In 1864, he was appointed as an Osaka Kaban and from 1865 the domain's military was called upon to assist with the policing of Kyoto. In the Boshin War of 1868, the domain quickly sided with the Meiji government, and he served as imperial governor of Katsuyama from 1869-1871. He retired in 1873. and spent his retirement in painting until his death in 1891.
