= Tenmei =

Period of Japanese history (1781–1789)

Tenmei (天明) is a Japanese era name (年号, nengō, literally "years name") for the years between the An'ei Era and before the Kansei Era, from April 1781 through January 1789. The reigning emperor was Kōkaku Tennō' (光格天皇).

== Change of era ==
- 1781 Tenmei gannen (天明元年): The new era name of Tenmei (meaning "dawn") was created to mark the enthronement of Emperor Kōkaku. The previous era ended and the new one commenced on the second day of the fourth month in what had been An'ei 11.

As is customary for choosing nengō, the name was selected from a passage in a historical Chinese text. In this case, the text was Classic of History (書経) (also quoted in The Great Learning (大學)), more specifically from the first of the King Tai Jia (大甲) chapters. It says: "先王顧諟天之明命..." meaning "The former king kept his eye continually on the bright requirements of Heaven, [and...]." This is continued with a description of reverence, virtue, and prosperity for the lands. From this, the two characters 天 and 明 were selected.

== Events of the Tenmei Era ==
- 1782 (Tenmei 2): The Tenmei famine is said to have begun.
- 1782 (Tenmei 2): An analysis of silver currency in China and Japan was presented to the Emperor by Minamoto no Masatsuna.
- 1783 (Tenmei 3): Mount Asama (浅間山,, Asama-yama) erupted in Shinano province, only 80 miles northwest of Edo, with a loss of life estimated at more than 20,000 (Tenmei eruption). [Today, Asama-yama's location is better described as on the border between Gunma Prefecture and Nagano Prefecture]. Japanologist Isaac Titsingh's published account of the Asama-yama eruption became the first of its kind in the West (1820). The volcano's devastation makes the Great Tenmei Famine even worse. Much of the agriculture of Shinano Province and Kōzuke Province remained unproductive or under-producing for the next four or five years.
- 1783 (Tenmei 3): Famine was exacerbated, according to 20th-century studies, because after eight years of near- or actual famine, neither the authorities nor the people had any reserves left to meet further drought and crop failures during the Great Tenmei Famine.
- 1784 (Tenmei 4): Country-wide celebrations took place in honor of Kōbō-Daishi, founder of Shingon Buddhism, who had died 950 years earlier.
- 1784 (Tenmei 4): The son of the Shōgun's rōjū (chief counselor) was assassinated inside Edo Castle. The comparatively young wakadoshiyori (junior counselor) Tanuma Okitomo was the son of the senior councilor Tanuma Okitsugu. The younger Tanuma was killed in front of his father as both were returning to their norimono (carriage) after a meeting of the Counselors of State had broken up. The involvement of senior figures in the Bakufu was suspected, but no one other than the lone assassin himself was punished. The result was that the liberalizing reforms that the older Tanuma had initiated were blocked.
- September 17, 1786 (Tenmei 6, 25th day of the eighth month): Shōgun Tokugawa Ieharu died and was buried in Edo.
- 1787 (Tenmei 7): Tokugawa Ienari became the 11th Shōgun of the Tokugawa shogunate.
- 1787 (Tenmei 7): Kutsuki Masatsuna published Seiyō Senpu (Notes on Western Coinage), with plates showing European and colonial currency.
- 1787 (Tenmei 7): Riots broke out in rice shops in Edo and Osaka.
- 1788 (Tenmei 8): Great Fire of Kyoto. A fire began in the city at three o'clock in the morning of March 6 (Tenmei 8, 29th day of the first month), and continued to burn uncontrolled until March 8 (first day of the second month). Embers smoldered until they were extinguished by heavy rain on March 11 (fourth day of the second month). The Emperor and his court fled the fire, and the Imperial Palace was destroyed. No other rebuilding was permitted until a new palace was completed. This fire was considered to be a major event. The opperhoofd of the VOC 'in Dejima noted in his official record book that "people are considering it to be a great and extraordinary heavenly portent".

== Notes ==
| Preceded by An'ei (安永) | Era or nengō Tenmei (天明); 1781–1789 | Succeeded by Kansei (寛政) |
