= Great Tenmei famine =

Famine in Japan (1782–1788)

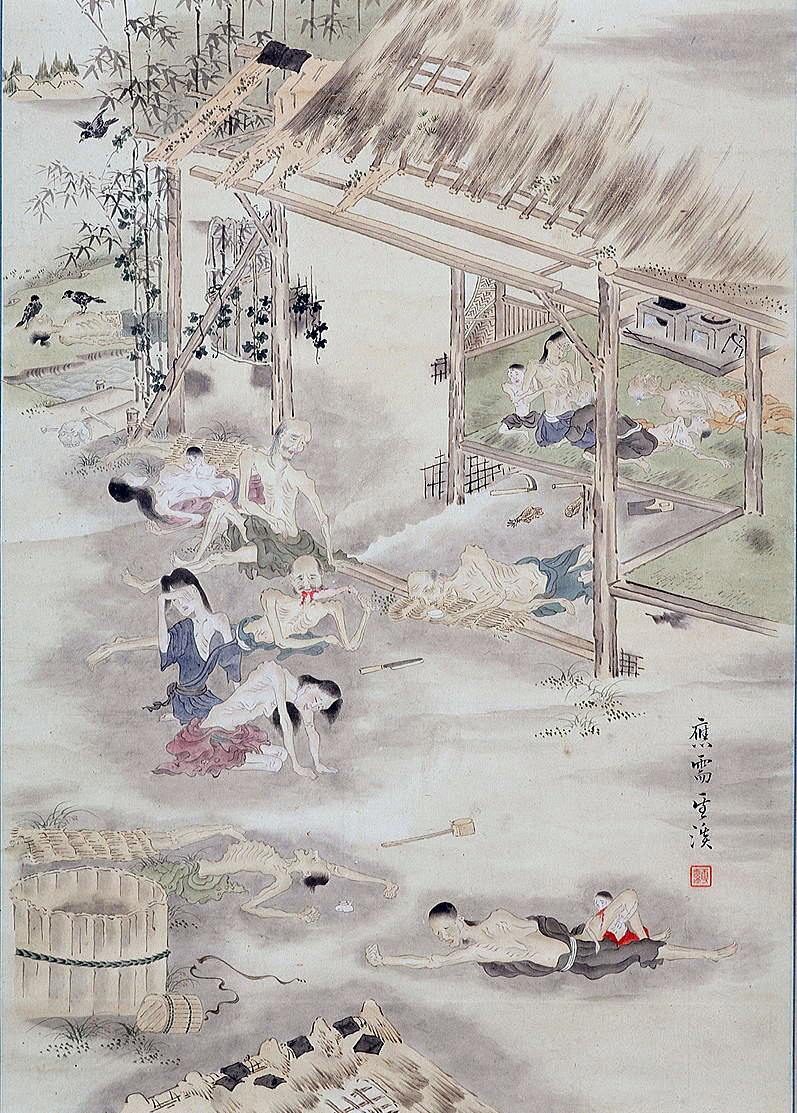
Great Tenmei famine

The Great Tenmei famine (天明の大飢饉, Tenmei no daikikin) affected Japan during the Edo period. The famine was the deadliest one during the early modern period in Japan. It is considered to have begun in 1782 and lasted until 1788. It was named after the Tenmei era (1781–1789) during the reign of Emperor Kōkaku. The ruling shoguns during the famine were Tokugawa Ieharu and Tokugawa Ienari.

== Causes ==
1783 eruption of Mount Asama. This eruption is said to have caused the Great Tenmei famine.

The 1783 eruption of Mount Asama is said to have caused the Great Tenmei famine. Starting in the 1770s, there was a sharp decline in crop yield in Tōhoku, the north-eastern region of Honshū, due to poor and cold weather, so food stocks in rural areas were exhausted. The situation was exacerbated by natural disasters: Mount Iwaki erupted on April 13, 1783 (3rd month, 12th day, in the year Tenmei-3, according to the Japanese calendar), as well as Mount Asama on July 6, so volcanic ash was thrown into the atmosphere of Japan. Aside from the direct damage caused by the eruptions, this led to a fall in solar radiation, resulting in cold weather that catastrophically damaged crops. The massive Icelandic Laki eruption of 1783 disrupted weather patterns all over the Northern Hemisphere and may have worsened matters as well.

Another cause of the famine was the government's economic policies. The famine spread largely due to mismanagement by the shogunate. During this period, a mercantilist policy was implemented by Tanuma Okitsugu, a minister of the Tokugawa shogunate cabinet. This was intended to commercialize agriculture and thus increase tax income, which was paid in rice. The policy caused economic difficulties for many hans and led to excessive investment in rice production (which was vulnerable to cold weather) in order to pay the higher taxes. It also resulted in local emergency stores of food becoming depleted. The climatic, volcanic and economic factors combined to result in poor harvests and a lack of emergency stores, which led to skyrocketing rice prices, so serious famine expanded to a national scale as a result.

== Results ==
The summer on the Pacific side of the Tōhoku region was foggy and rainy. The cold weather required people to wear thick cotton clothing. According to Nochi-mi-gusa, written by Genpaku Sugita, approximately 20,000 people starved to death, mainly in rural areas of the Tōhoku region. However, many local authorities, afraid of being accused of economic mismanagement, did not report the full extent of the damage, so the actual death toll may have been far higher, perhaps even ten times Sugita's estimate. The outcome was particularly severe in Mutsu Province, where it was reported that over 100,000 people died. Including people who fled the area, Hirosaki (Tsugaru) Han lost almost half of its population. The combined impact of famine and outbreaks of disease resulted in a population decline of more than 920,000 people across Japan between 1780 and 1786.

== Cultural response ==
While the immediate aftermath of the eruption involved darkened skies and widespread suffering, the disaster eventually became a subject of satire in kibyōshi (yellow-backed comic books). These illustrated works, popular among townspeople and lower-ranking samurai, utilized wit and irony to help the population cope with the trauma of the famine and the subsequent political turmoil of the Kansei Reforms.

Although the disaster occurred in 1783, satirical depictions peaked after 1787 during the leadership of Matsudaira Sadanobu. A recurring motif in these works was the transformation of volcanic ash into gold, a theme that parodied the era's obsession with wealth during a time of extreme food scarcity. For example, the 1785 work Kiruna no Ne kara Kanenonaru Ki ("Do Not Cut the Tree That Grows Money from Its Roots") depicted gold coins falling from burning houses, ironically suggesting that destruction brought prosperity.

Later works used this imagery to critique social inequality and the government's strict frugality policies. The 1789 book Kōshi-jima Toki ni Aizome depicted ash from Mount Asama reaching Edo and turning into coins. The satire highlighted the grim reality that in a famine, gold was as worthless as ash because survival depended on rice, not currency. Other works, such as Yare Deta, Sore Deta: Kamenoko ga Deta yo (1788), satirized food shortages through puns, depicting soft-shelled turtles (*kame*)—a popular food source—rescuing a "rice" turtle (*kome*), thereby mocking the confusion between official ideals and the desperate needs of the populace.

These cultural products did not necessarily advocate for political overthrow but provided emotional release. By framing the catastrophic events through humor and the "ash into gold" narrative, kibyōshi allowed Edo residents to exhibit resilience in the face of environmental and economic collapse.

== Population history ==
The effects of the famine can be seen from the census numbers for the years before, during, and after the famine recorded for all of Japan and in the Tohoku region, specifically.

=== Japan ===
- 1774 (An'ei 3): 25,990,000
- 1780 (An'ei 9): 26,010,000
- 1786 (Tenmei 6): 25,090,000
- 1792 (Kansei 4): 24,890,000
- 1798 (Kansei 10): 25,470,000

=== Tohoku ===
- 1750 (Kan'en 3): 2,680,000
- 1786 (Tenmei 6): 2,370,000
- 1804 (Bunka 1): 2,470,000
- 1828 (Bunsei 11): 2,630,000
