= Hishima Station =

Railway station in Katsuyama, Fukui Prefecture, Japan

Hishima Station 比島駅
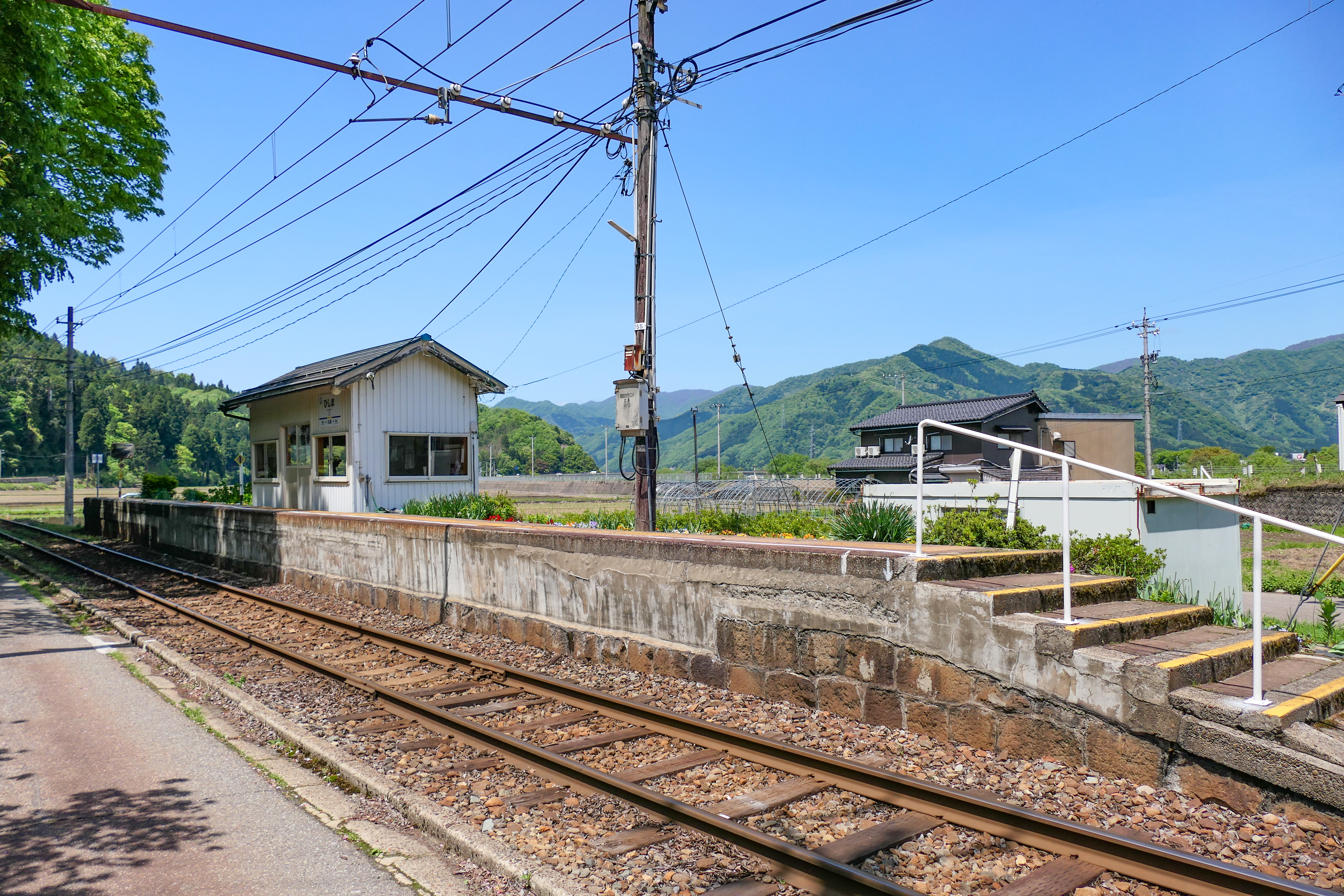
- Mishima Station in April 2022

General information
- Location: Hishima, Onwa-chō, Katsuyama-shi, Fukui-ken 911-0831; Japan
- Coordinates: 36°03′58″N 136°29′01″E
- Operator: Echizen Railway
- Line: ■ Katsuyama Eiheiji Line
- Distance: 26.4 km from Fukui
- Platforms: 1 side platform
- Tracks: 1

Other information
- Status: Unstaffed
- Station code: E22
- Website: Official website

History
- Opened: May 1, 1931

Passengers
- FY2015: 0
Location
- Location within Japan

Hishima Station (比島駅, Hishima-eki) is an Echizen Railway Katsuyama Eiheiji Line railway station located in Katsuyama, Fukui Prefecture, Japan.

== Lines ==
Hota Station is served by the Katsuyama Eiheiji Line, and is located 26.4 kilometers from the terminus of the line at Fukui.

== Station layout ==
The station consists of one side platform serving a single bi-directional track. The station is unattended.

== Adjacent stations ==
«	Service	»
Katsuyama Eiheiji Line
Express: Does not stop at this station
Hossaka	Local	Katsuyama

== History ==
Hishima Station was opened on May 1, 1931. Operations were halted from June 25, 2001. The station reopened on October 19, 2003 as an Echizen Railway station.

== Passenger statistics ==
In fiscal 2016, the station was used by an average of 8 passengers daily (boarding passengers only).

== Surrounding area ==
- The station is in the middle of a small residential area. The Hishima Citizens' Hall is 100 meters south.
- The Kuzuryū River and Fukui Prefectural Route 168 pass to the north.

== See also ==
- List of railway stations in Japan
