= Katsuyama Station =

Railway station in Katsuyama, Fukui Prefecture, Japan

Katsuyama Station 勝山駅
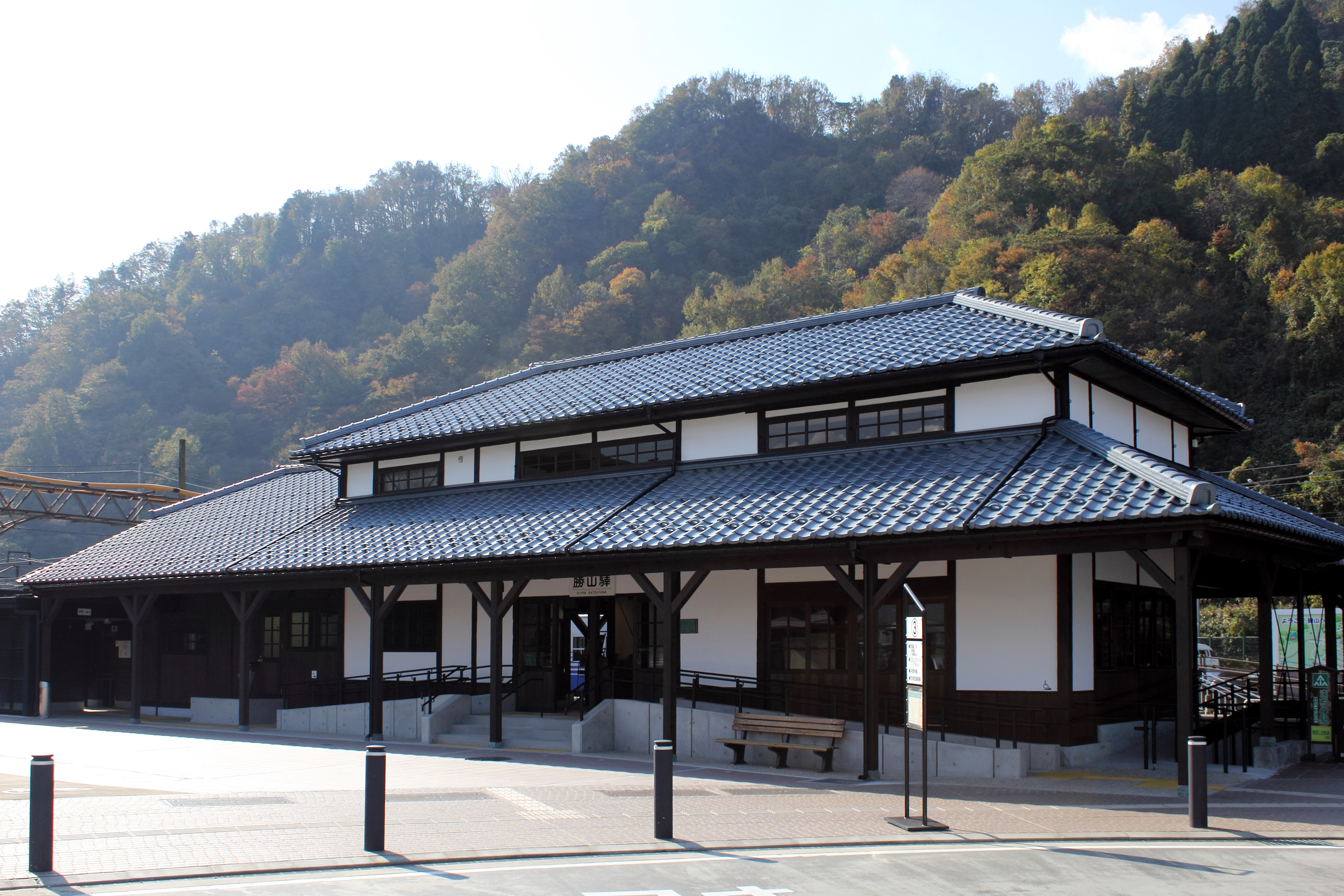
- Katsuyama Station in November 2013

General information
- Location: 34-2-7 Hishima, Onwa-chō, Katsuyama-shi, Fukui-ken 911-0831; Japan
- Coordinates: 36°03′23″N 136°29′32″E
- Operator: Echizen Railway
- Line: ■ Katsuyama Eiheiji Line
- Distance: 27.8 km from Fukui
- Platforms: 1 side + 1 island platform
- Tracks: 1

Other information
- Status: Staffed
- Station code: E23
- Website: Official website

History
- Opened: March 11, 1914

Passengers
- FY2015: 395
Location
- Location within Japan

Katsuyama Station (勝山駅, Katsuyama-eki) is an Echizen Railway Katsuyama Eiheiji Line railway station located in the city of Katsuyama, Fukui Prefecture, Japan.

== Lines ==
Katsuyama Station is a terminal station of the Katsuyama Eiheiji Line, and is located 27.8 kilometers from the opposing terminus of the line at Fukui.

== Station layout ==
The station consists of one side platform and one island platform connected by a level crossing. The station is staffed. The station building is the original structure from 1914, and was designated a Registered Tangible Cultural Property on February 17, 2004.

== Adjacent stations ==
| « | Service | » |
Katsuyama Eiheiji Line
| Hossaka | Express (in direction of Fukui only) | Terminus |
| Hishima | Local | Terminus |

== History ==
Katsuyama Station was opened on March 11, 1914. On March 2, 1942 the line was transferred to Keifuku Electric Railway. The line connecting Katsuyama with Keifuku-Ōno was discontinued on August 13, 1974 making Katsuyama the terminus of the line. Operations were halted from June 25, 2001. The station reopened on October 19, 2003 as an Echizen Railway station.

== Passenger statistics ==
In fiscal 2015, the station was used by an average of 395 passengers daily (boarding passengers only).

== Surrounding area ==
- This station serves as the gateway station to Katsuyama, but the central business district is on the other side of the Kuzuryū River.
- Aside from a bus stop and taxi stand in front of the station, the only places of note are some shops and Osaka Special Alloy Co. Ltd.'s Katsuyama Plant.
- On the other side of the river, points of interest include:
  - Katsuyama City Hall
  - Katsuyama Post Office
  - Fukui Prefectural Dinosaur Museum (16 minutes away by taxi)
  - Echizen Daibutsu (Seidaiji) (10 minutes away by bus)

== See also ==
- List of railway stations in Japan
