= Katsuyama Castle =

Katsuyama Castle 勝山城
- Katsuyama, Fukui Prefecture, Japan
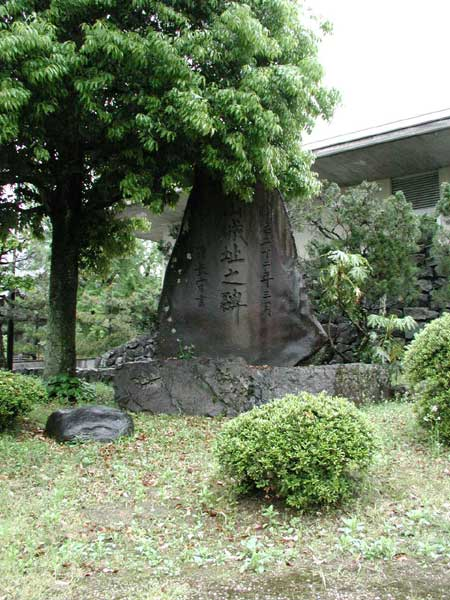
- Monument on the site of Katsuyama Castle

Site information
- Type: Japanese castle
- Open to the public: yes
- Condition: Ruins

Location
- Coordinates: 36°3′39.82″N 136°30′1.66″E

Site history
- Built: 1579
- Built by: Shibata clan
- In use: Sengoku-Edo period
- Demolished: 1871

Katsuyama Castle (勝山城, Katsuyama-jō) was a Japanese castle located in the city of Katsuyama Fukui Prefecture, in the Hokuriku region of Japan. Built in the Sengoku period by the Shibata clan, it was occupied by a succession of daimyō of Echizen-Katsuyama Domain under the Edo period Tokugawa shogunate. The site is now a public park.

== History ==
Per the Shinchō kōki, Katsuyama Castle was built in 1579 by Shibata Katsuyasu, a relative of Shibata Katsuie, one of Oda Nobunaga's leading generals, and Hara Nagayori was assigned as its castellan. The Shibata clan were destroyed in conflicts with Toyotomi Hideyoshi, and after the Battle of Sekigahara, the entire province of Echizen was assigned by Tokugawa Ieyasu to his second son, Yūki Hideyasu in 1601 as Fukui Domain. In 1624, Fukui Domain was divided, with Yūki Hideyasu's fifth son, Matsudaira Naomoto being awarded a 30,000 koku fief centered at Katsuyama. This became Echizen-Katsuyama Domain. Matsudaira Naomoto was transferred to Ōno Domain in 1635, and was replaced by his younger brother, Matsudaira Naoyoshi, who was in turn transferred to Ōno Domain in 1644, at which point the domain became part of the tenryo territories under direct control of the shogunate.

In 1691, Echizen-Katsuyama Domain was revived for a cadet branch of the Ogasawara clan led by Ogasawara Tadanobu. The Ogasawara clan would rule Katsuyama for the next eight generations until the Meiji restoration. Tadanobu's son, Ogasawara Nobutora received permission from the shogunate in 1708 to rebuild the castle on the pretext of restoring the old structures; however, due to fires and lack of funds, the castle was not completed until 1799, only to burn down again in 1822. It was reconstructed in 1826, but was destroyed by the new Meiji government in 1871.

== Current situation ==
The current Katsuyama city hall now stands on the site of the inner bailey of the castle, with some remnants of the moat and ramparts remaining, along with the base of the donjon.

The castle should not be confused with the Katsuyama Castle Museum, also located in Katsuyama. The Museum is housed in a huge six-story faux-donjon built in 1992, housing numerous artefacts from the Edo period gathered from all over the country.

== Literature ==
- Schmorleitz, Morton S. (1974). Castles in Japan. Tokyo: Charles E. Tuttle Co. pp. 144–145. ISBN 0-8048-1102-4.
- Motoo, Hinago (1986). Japanese Castles. Tokyo: Kodansha. p. 200 pages. ISBN 0-87011-766-1.
- Mitchelhill, Jennifer (2004). Castles of the Samurai: Power and Beauty. Tokyo: Kodansha. p. 112 pages. ISBN 4-7700-2954-3.
- Turnbull, Stephen (2003). Japanese Castles 1540-1640. Osprey Publishing. p. 64 pages. ISBN 1-84176-429-9.
