= Tenmei eruption =

1783 eruption of Mount Asama in Japan

Tenmei eruption 天明大噴火
- Volcano: Mount Asama
- Start date: May 9, 1783
- End date: August 5, 1783
- Type: Plinian eruption
- VEI: 4
- Deaths: 1,500–1,624 dead

Maps
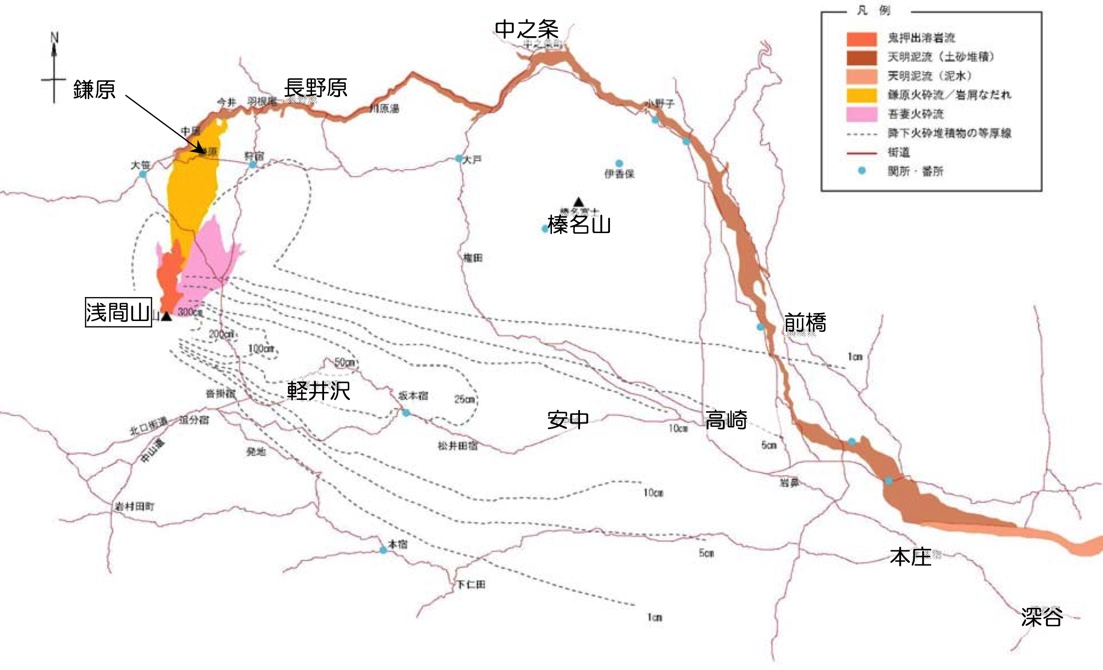
- Map of lava and mud flows, and ash depths: Onioshidashi Lava Flow; Agatsuma pyroclastic flow; Kanbara Pyroclastic Flow/Debris Avalanche; Tenmei mudflow (sedimentation); Tenmei mudflow (muddy water)

The Tenmei eruption (Japanese: 天明大噴火, Tenmei daifunka) was a large eruption of Mount Asama that occurred in 1783 (Tenmei 3). This eruption was one of the causes of the Tenmei famine. It is estimated that about 1,500–1,624 people were killed in the eruption. The event is known in Japanese as The Burning of Asama in Tenmei (天明の浅間焼け, Tenmei no Asamayake).

== Background ==
Japan is situated along a zone of convergence between at least four major and minor tectonic plates. The Philippine Sea Plate dives beneath the Amurian Plate and Okinawa Plate along the Nankai Trough and Ryukyu Trench in southern Japan. In northern Japan, the Pacific Plate subducts beneath the Okhotsk Plate, part of the larger North American Plate, along the Japan and Kuril trenches. The subduction process is related to the production of volcanoes in Japan as the downgoing oceanic slab undergoes dehydration at depths of roughly 90 to 100 km beneath the overriding plate. Water in the structure of hydrated minerals interact with the upper mantle, lowering its melting point. As the mantle begins to melt, its density decreases and rises through the upper crust, forming a volcanic vent.

== 1783 eruption of Mount Asama ==
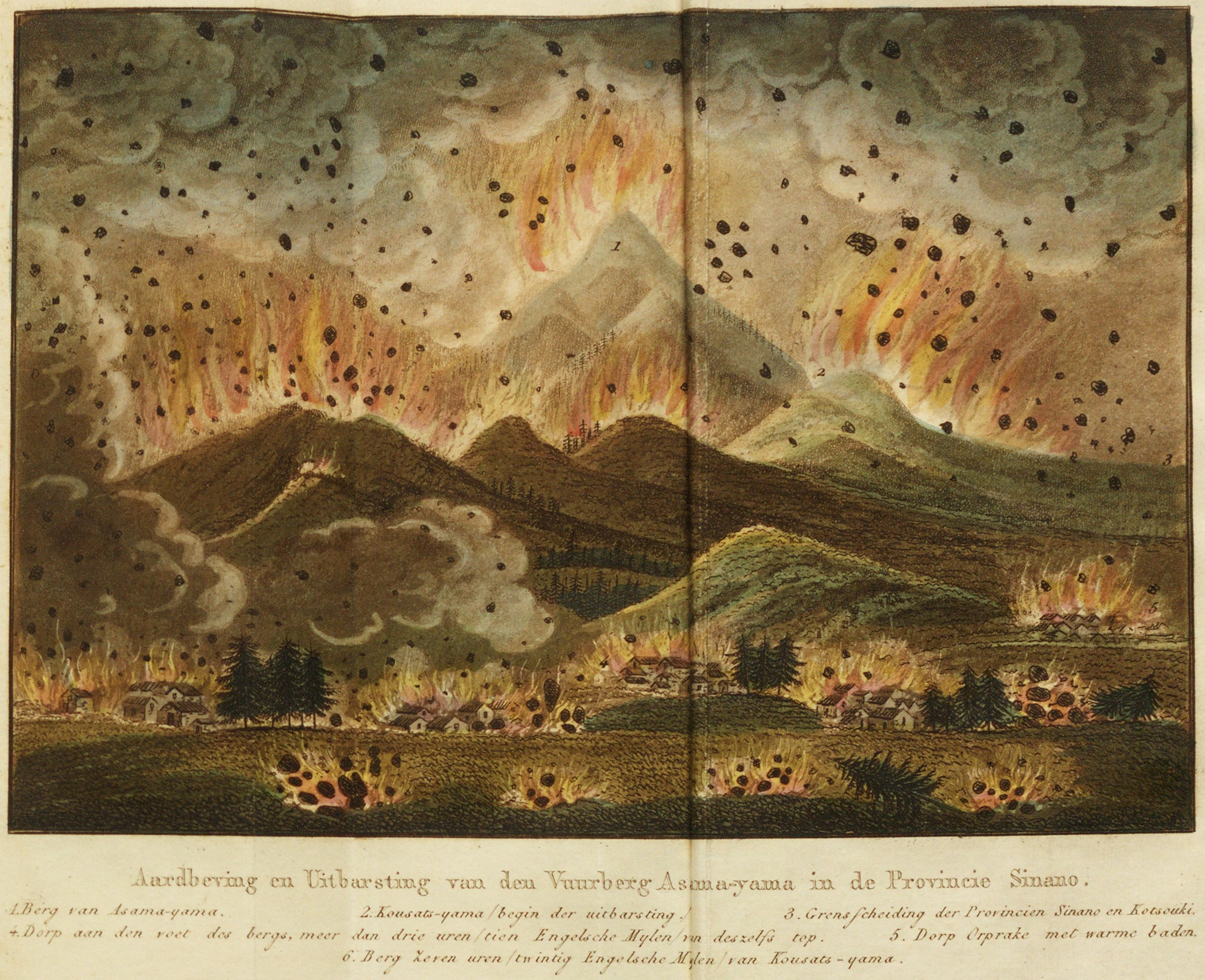
Bijzonderheden over Japan (1824). Illustration of the eruption of Mt. Asama.

Mount Asama erupted in 1783, causing widespread damage. The three-month-long Plinian eruption that began on 9 May 1783, produced andesitic pumice falls, pyroclastic flows, lava flows, and enlarged the cone. The climactic eruption began on 4 August and lasted for 15 hours, and contained pumice falls and pyroclastic flows. The complex features of this eruption are explained by rapid deposits of coarse pyroclastic ash near the vent and the subsequent flows of lava; and these events which were accompanied by a high eruption plume which generated further injections of pumice into the air.

Dutch diplomat Isaac Titsingh's account of the Asama-Yama eruption was posthumously published in French in Paris in 1820; and an English translation was published in London in 1822. These books were based on Japanese sources, and the work represented the first of its kind to be disseminated in Europe and the West.

The volcano's devastation exacerbated what was already known as the "Tenmei famine". Much of the agriculturally productive land in Shinano and Kōzuke provinces would remain fallow or under-producing for the next four or five years. The effects of this eruption were made worse because, after years of near or actual famine, neither the authorities nor the people had any remaining reserves. The 4 August eruption killed up to 1,400 people, with an additional 20,000 more deaths caused by the famine.

Due to the Tenmei eruption, a lava flow called "Onioshidashi" flowed along the northern slope of Mt. Asama. Now, it is known as a tourist destination.

== Kanbara tragedy ==
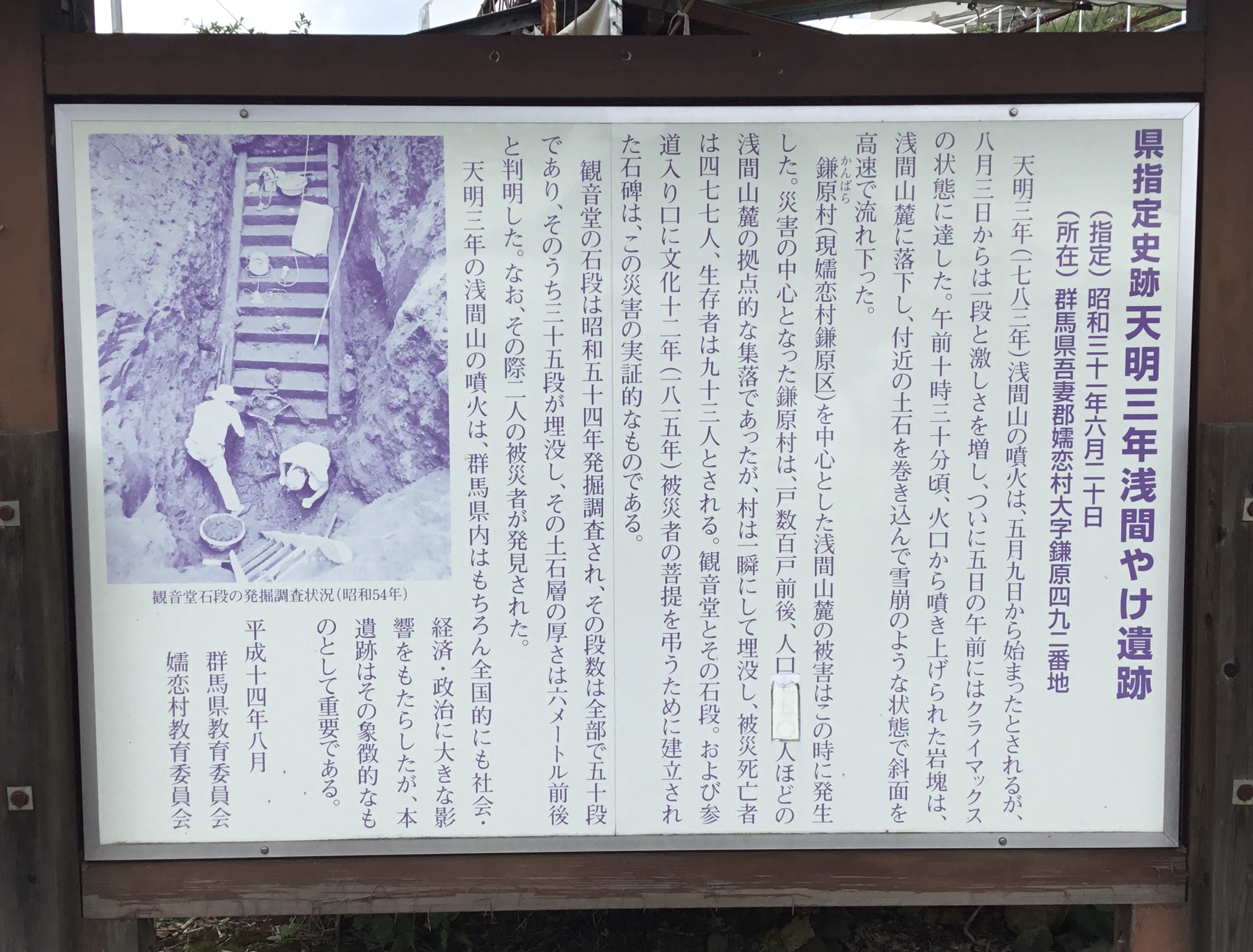
Kanbara site

The most seriously damaged area was the Kanbara (now Tsumagoi, Gunma Prefecture). Kanbara was buried in pyroclastic flow and 477 people were killed. Kanbara is sometimes called "Japan's Pompeii".

== Cultural response ==
While the immediate aftermath of the eruption involved darkened skies and widespread suffering, the disaster eventually became a subject of satire in kibyōshi (yellow-backed comic books). These illustrated works, popular among townspeople and lower-ranking samurai, utilized wit and irony to help the population cope with the trauma of the famine and the subsequent political turmoil of the Kansei Reforms.

Although the disaster occurred in 1783, satirical depictions peaked after 1787 during the leadership of Matsudaira Sadanobu. A recurring motif in these works was the transformation of volcanic ash into gold, a theme that parodied the era's obsession with wealth during a time of extreme food scarcity. For example, the 1785 work Kiruna no Ne kara Kanenonaru Ki ("Do Not Cut the Tree That Grows Money from Its Roots") depicted gold coins falling from burning houses, ironically suggesting that destruction brought prosperity.

Later works used this imagery to critique social inequality and the government's strict frugality policies. The 1789 book Kōshi-jima Toki ni Aizome depicted ash from Mount Asama reaching Edo and turning into coins. The satire highlighted the grim reality that in a famine, gold was as worthless as ash because survival depended on rice, not currency. Other works, such as Yare Deta, Sore Deta: Kamenoko ga Deta yo (1788), satirized food shortages through puns, depicting soft-shelled turtles (*kame*)—a popular food source—rescuing a "rice" turtle (*kome*), thereby mocking the confusion between official ideals and the desperate needs of the populace.

These cultural products did not necessarily advocate for political overthrow but provided emotional release. By framing the catastrophic events through humor and the "ash into gold" narrative, kibyōshi allowed Edo residents to exhibit resilience in the face of environmental and economic collapse.
