= Hossaka Station =

Railway station in Katsuyama, Fukui Prefecture, Japan

Hossaka Station 発坂駅
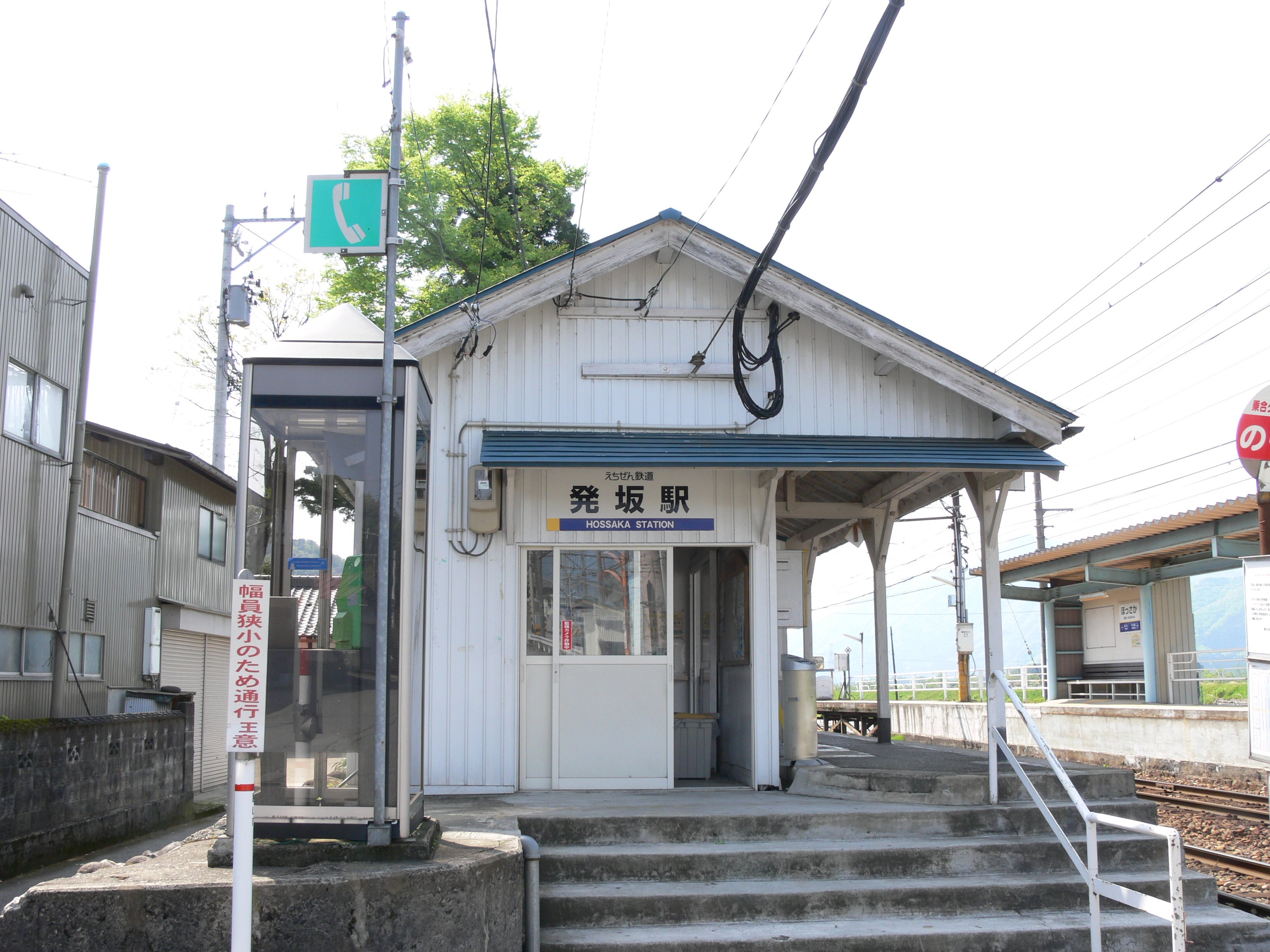
- Hossaka Station in May 2009

General information
- Location: Hota, Shikadani-chō, Katsuyama-shi, Fukui-ken 911-0848; Japan
- Coordinates: 36°04′21″N 136°27′57″E
- Operator: Echizen Railway
- Line: ■ Katsuyama Eiheiji Line
- Distance: 24.5 km from Fukui
- Platforms: 2 side platforms
- Tracks: 2

Other information
- Status: Unstaffed
- Station code: E21
- Website: Official website

History
- Opened: March 11, 1914

Passengers
- FY2015: 58
Location
- Location within Japan

Hossaka Station (発坂駅, Hossaka-eki) is an Echizen Railway Katsuyama Eiheiji Line railway station located in the city of Katsuyama, Fukui Prefecture, Japan.

== Lines ==
Hossaka Station is served by the Katsuyama Eiheiji Line, and is located 24.5 kilometers from the terminus of the line at Fukui.

== Station layout ==
The station consists of two opposed ground-level side platforms connected by a level crossing. The station is unattended.

== Adjacent stations ==
«	Service	»
Katsuyama Eiheiji Line
Express: Does not stop at this station
Hota	Local	Hishima

== History ==
Hossaka Station was opened on March 11, 1914. Operations were halted from June 25, 2001. The station reopened on October 19, 2003 as an Echizen Railway station.

== Passenger statistics ==
In fiscal 2016, the station was used by an average of 58 passengers daily (boarding passengers only).

== Surrounding area ==
- The surrounding area is mostly residential with some shops and is more dense than either neighboring station.
- A bridge over the Kuzuryū River lies to the north.
- Fukui Prefectural Routes 168 and 31 intersect east of the station.

== See also ==
- List of railway stations in Japan
