= Katsuyama, Fukui =

Katsuyama 勝山市
- City
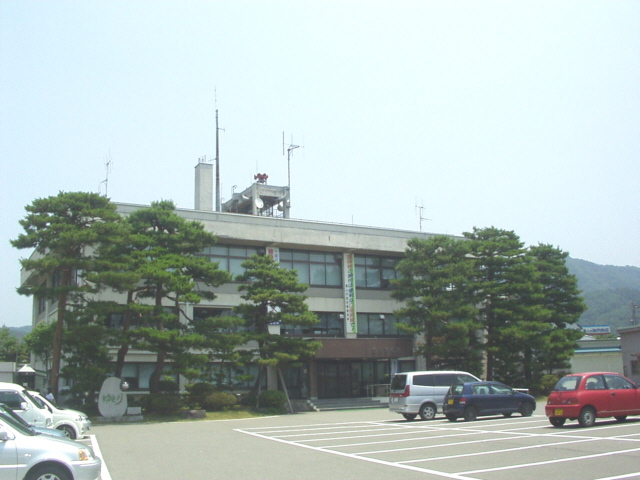
- Katsuyama City Hall

- Flag Emblem

- Location of Katsuyama in Fukui Prefecture

- Coordinates: 36°03′39″N 136°30′02″E
- Country: Japan
- Region: Chūbu (Hokuriku)
- Prefecture: Fukui
- Town established: April 1, 1889
- City established: September 1, 1954

Government
  - Mayor: Mikio Mizunami (from December 2020)

Area
  - Total: 253.88 km^{2} (98.02 sq mi)

Population (January 31, 2026)
  - Total: 20,653
  - Density: 81.349/km^{2} (210.69/sq mi)
- Time zone: UTC+9 (Japan Standard Time)
- Phone number: 0779-88-1111
- Address: 1-1-1 Motomachi, Katsuyama-shi, Fukui-ken 911-8501
- Climate: Cfa
- Website: www.city.katsuyama.fukui.jp
- Symbols
- Flower: Satsuki Azalea
- Tree: Cryptomeria

Katsuyama (勝山市, Katsuyama-shi) is a city located in Fukui Prefecture, Japan. As of 31 January 2026, the city has an estimated population of 20,653 in 7,971 households, and a population density of 81 persons per km^{2}. The total area of the city was 253.88 square kilometres (98.02 sq mi). Katsuyama was the ninth-best ranking city in a ranking that compared health and sanitation in cities around the world published in April 2007.

== Geography ==
Katsuyama is located in the Katsuyama Basin of far northern Fukui Prefecture, bordered by Ishikawa Prefecture to the north, and surrounded by mountains on all sides. The Kuzuryū River flows through part of the city. Parts of the city are within the borders of Hakusan National Park.

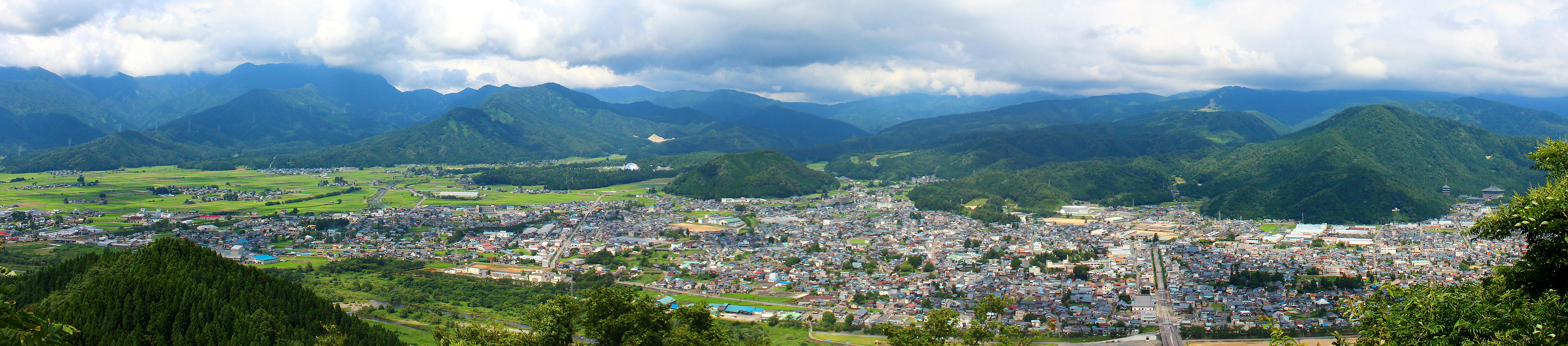
Downtown Katsuyama as seen from the west

=== Neighbouring municipalities ===
Fukui Prefecture

- Eiheiji
- Fukui
- Ōno
- Sakai

Ishikawa Prefecture

- Hakusan
- Kaga
- Komatsu

=== Climate ===
Katsuyama has a humid subtropical climate (Cfa per the Köppen climate classification system) characterized by warm, wet summers and cold winters with heavy snowfall. The average annual temperature in Katsuyama is 13.3 °C (55.9 °F). The average annual rainfall is 2,281.5 mm (89.82 in) with July as the wettest month. The temperatures are highest on average in August, at around 26.0 °C (78.8 °F), and lowest in January, at around 1.1 °C (34.0 °F).

Climate data for Katsuyama (1993−2020 normals, extremes 1993−present)
Month	Jan	Feb	Mar	Apr	May	Jun	Jul	Aug	Sep	Oct	Nov	Dec	Year
Record high °C (°F)	16.2 (61.2)	17.3 (63.1)	22.6 (72.7)	29.4 (84.9)	33.8 (92.8)	34.7 (94.5)	36.7 (98.1)	36.8 (98.2)	35.5 (95.9)	29.7 (85.5)	25.0 (77.0)	22.0 (71.6)	36.8 (98.2)
Mean daily maximum °C (°F)	4.6 (40.3)	5.7 (42.3)	10.5 (50.9)	17.1 (62.8)	22.5 (72.5)	25.7 (78.3)	29.3 (84.7)	31.0 (87.8)	26.8 (80.2)	21.1 (70.0)	14.6 (58.3)	7.7 (45.9)	18.1 (64.5)
Daily mean °C (°F)	1.1 (34.0)	1.6 (34.9)	5.3 (41.5)	11.5 (52.7)	17.1 (62.8)	20.9 (69.6)	24.7 (76.5)	26.0 (78.8)	21.8 (71.2)	15.7 (60.3)	9.7 (49.5)	3.8 (38.8)	13.3 (55.9)
Mean daily minimum °C (°F)	−1.7 (28.9)	−1.9 (28.6)	0.7 (33.3)	6.1 (43.0)	11.9 (53.4)	16.8 (62.2)	21.2 (70.2)	22.0 (71.6)	17.8 (64.0)	11.4 (52.5)	5.4 (41.7)	0.6 (33.1)	9.2 (48.5)
Record low °C (°F)	−9.1 (15.6)	−9.8 (14.4)	−6.9 (19.6)	−2.9 (26.8)	2.2 (36.0)	8.9 (48.0)	14.7 (58.5)	14.0 (57.2)	8.2 (46.8)	1.9 (35.4)	−1.7 (28.9)	−8.0 (17.6)	−9.8 (14.4)
Average precipitation mm (inches)	224.5 (8.84)	138.4 (5.45)	154.2 (6.07)	150.0 (5.91)	159.7 (6.29)	180.0 (7.09)	291.4 (11.47)	195.6 (7.70)	195.0 (7.68)	148.4 (5.84)	180.0 (7.09)	260.2 (10.24)	2,281.5 (89.82)
Average precipitation days (≥ 1.0 mm)	21.1	16.2	15.6	12.4	11.6	11.7	13.7	10.0	12.2	11.8	14.9	21.3	172.5
Mean monthly sunshine hours	67.1	89.3	125.0	163.8	185.5	142.2	141.8	191.2	141.1	149.1	114.9	74.6	1,585.6
Source: Japan Meteorological Agency

== Demographics ==
Per Japanese census data, the population of Katsuyama has been declining over the past 50 years.

Historical population
Year	Pop.	±%
1970	32,691	—
1980	30,852	−5.6%
1990	29,805	−3.4%
2000	28,143	−5.6%
2010	25,466	−9.5%
2020	22,150	−13.0%

== History ==
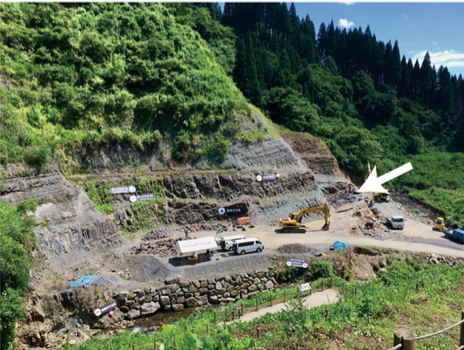
The Kitadani Dinosaur Quarry in Katsuyama

Katsuyama is part of ancient Echizen Province. During the Sengoku period, Katsuyama Castle was the stronghold of Shibata Katsuyasu, a relative of Shibata Katsuie. During the Edo period, the area was divided between the holdings of Echizen-Katsuyama Domain, Fukui Domain, Ōno Domain, and Gujō Domain. Following the Meiji restoration, it was organised into part of Ōno District in Fukui Prefecture. With the establishment of the modern municipalities system on April 1, 1889, the town of Katsuyama was established. It annexed the village of Inose on April 15, 1931, On September 1, 1954, Katsuyama merged with the villages of Arado, Muraoka, Kitago, Kitadani, Shikadani, Osoha, Heisenji and Nomuki to form the city of Katsuyama.

== Government ==
Katsuyama has a mayor-council form of government with a directly elected mayor and a unicameral city legislature of 16 members. Katsuyama contributes one member to the Fukui Prefectural Assembly. In terms of national politics, the city is part of the Fukui 1st district of the lower house of the Diet of Japan.

== Economy ==
From the Meiji period, the main industry of Katsuyama has been textiles, and the industry still plays a prominent role in the local economy. Agriculture and tourism are also thriving.

== Education ==
Katsuyama has nine public elementary schools and three middle schools operated by the city government, and one combined private elementary/middle school. The city has one public high school operated by the Fukui Prefectural Board of Education. The prefecture also operates one special education school for the handicapped.Fukui Prefectural University opened a branch campus in Katsuyama in 2026.

== Transportation ==
=== Railway ===
Echizen Railway Katsuyama Eiheiji Line

- Hota - Hossaka - Hishima - Katsuyama

=== Highway ===
- Hokuriku Expressway
- National Route 416
- National Route 265

== International relations ==
- Aspen, Colorado, United States, friendship city

== Local attractions ==
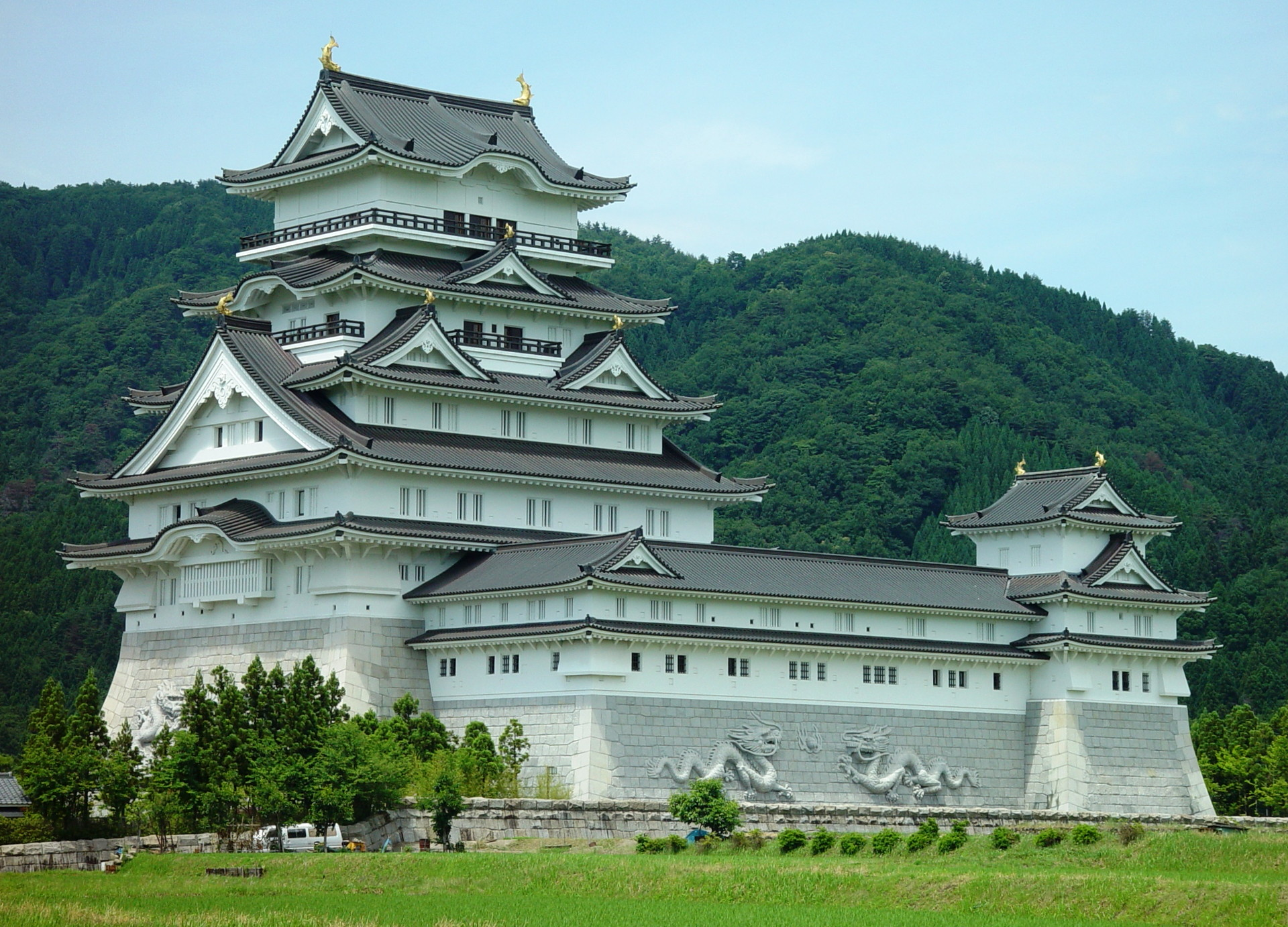
Katsuyama Castle Museum

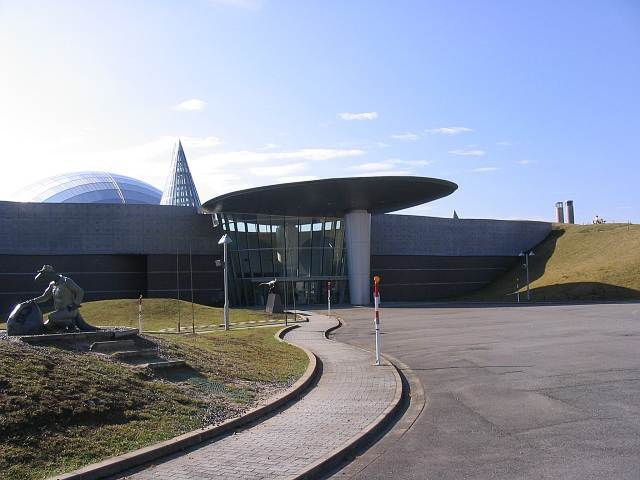
Fukui Prefectural Dinosaur Museum

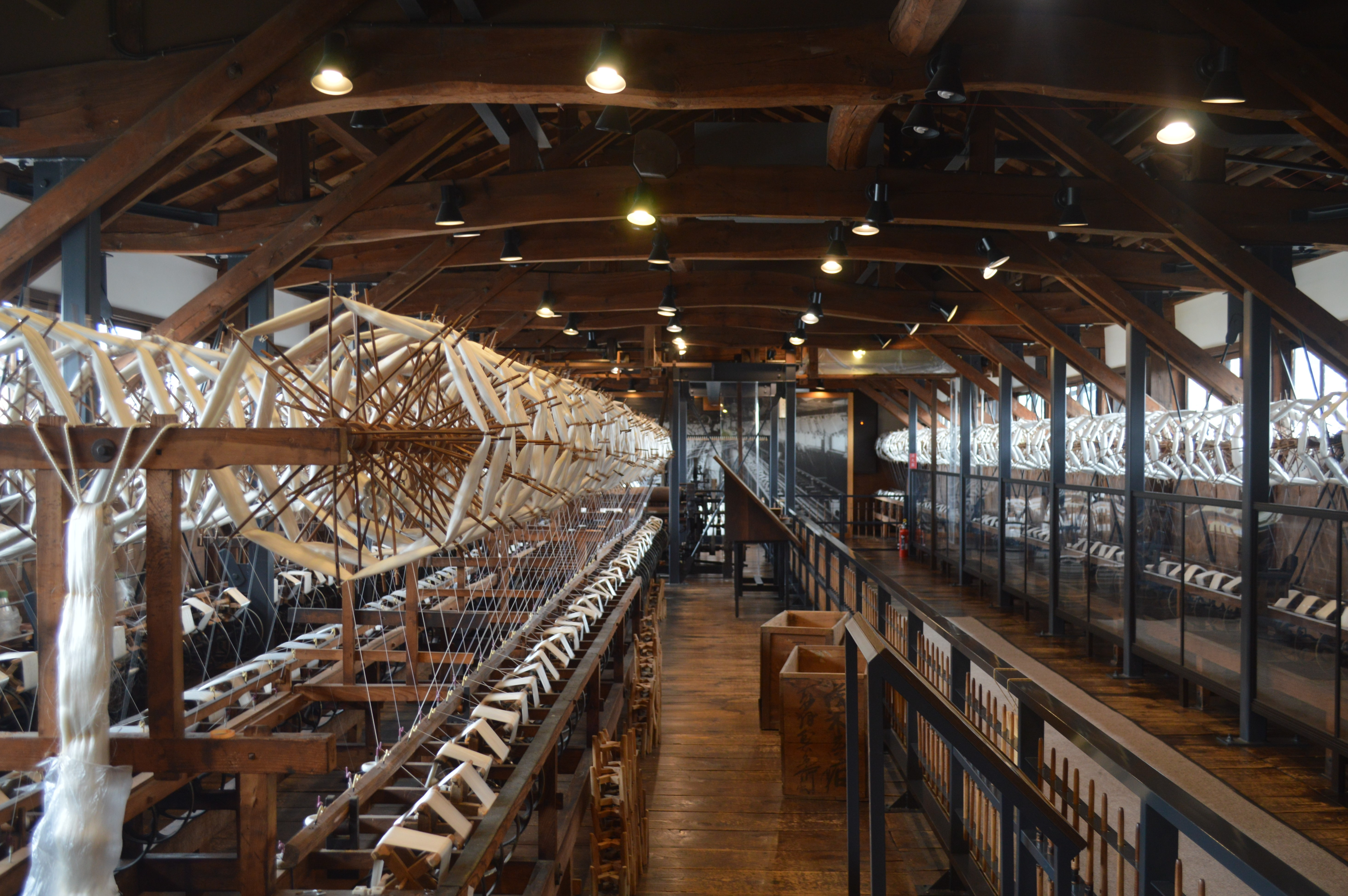
Hataya Memorial Museum Yumeore

- Fukui Prefectural Dinosaur Museum
- Heisenji Hakusan Jinja
- Katsuyama Castle
- Hataya Memorial Museum Yumeore

== Notable people from Katsuyama ==
- Unshō Ishizuka, voice actor
- Genichiro Tenryu, Japanese Former Professional Wrestler
- Akane Yamaguchi, Japanese badminton player
