= Mount Asama =

Volcano on the island of Honshū, Japan

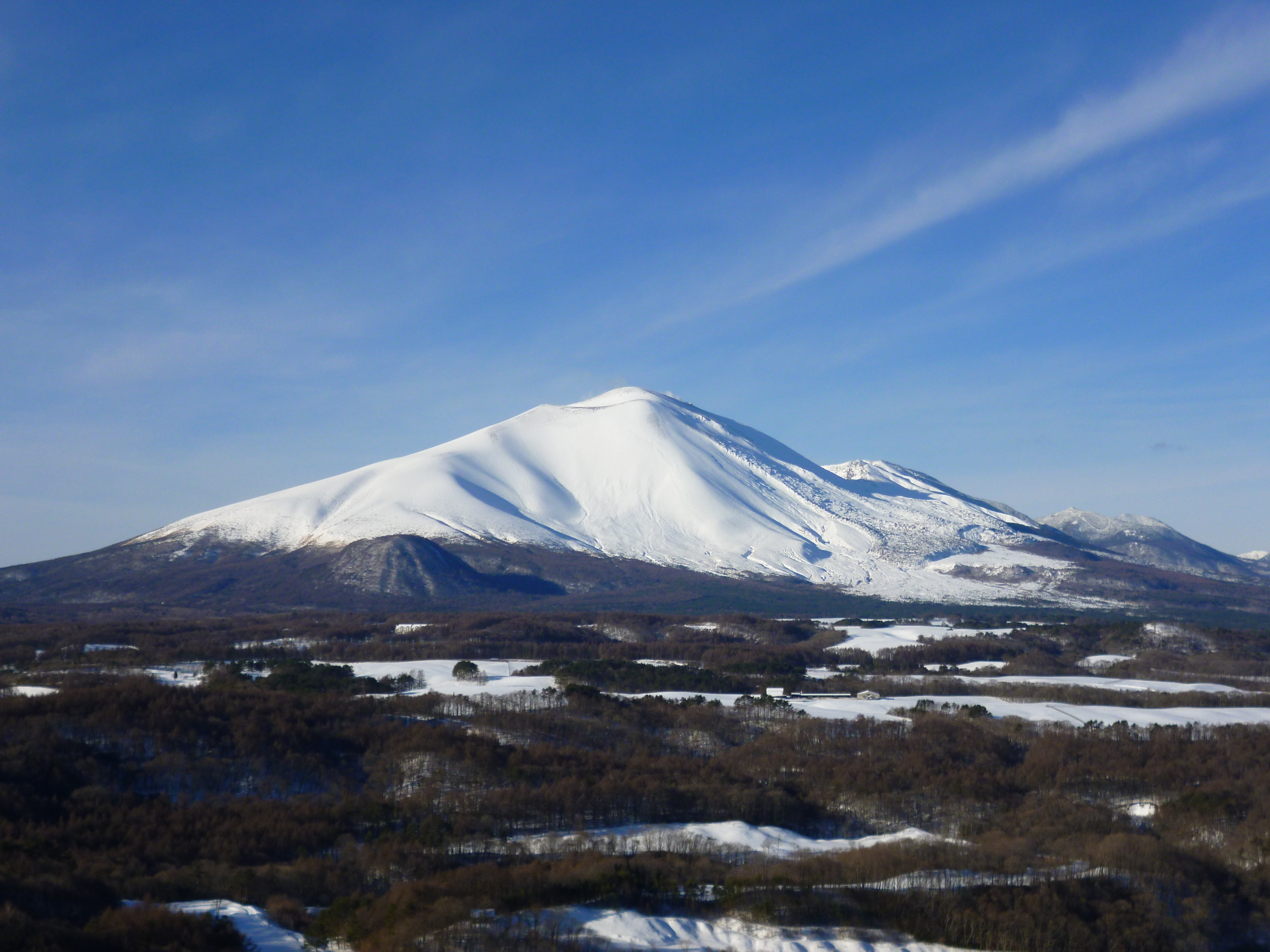
- Viewed from the East

Highest point
- Elevation: 2,568 m (8,425 ft)
- Prominence: 1,271 m (4,170 ft)
- Listing: List of mountains and hills of Japan by height 100 famous mountains in Japan; List of volcanoes in Japan; Ribu
- Coordinates: 36°24′23″N 138°31′23″E

Naming
- Native name: 浅間山 (Japanese)

Geography
- Location within Japan Location within Gunma Prefecture
- Location: Honshū, Japan
- Topo map(s): Geographical Survey Institute 25000:1 浅間山; 50000:1 長野

Geology
- Rock age: Late Pleistocene–Holocene
- Mountain type: Complex volcano
- Volcanic arc: Northeastern Japan Arc
- Last eruption: 7 August 2019

Mount Asama (浅間山, Asama-yama) is an active stratovolcano in central Honshū, the main island of Japan. The volcano is the most active on Honshū. The Japan Meteorological Agency classifies Mount Asama as rank A. It stands 2,568 metres (8,425 ft) above sea level on the border of Gunma and Nagano prefectures. It is included in 100 Famous Japanese Mountains.

== Geology ==
Mount Asama sits at the conjunction of the Izu–Bonin–Mariana Arc and the Northeastern Japan Arc. The mountain is built up from non-alkali mafic and pyroclastic volcanic rocks dating from the Late Pleistocene to the Holocene. The main rock types are andesite and dacite.

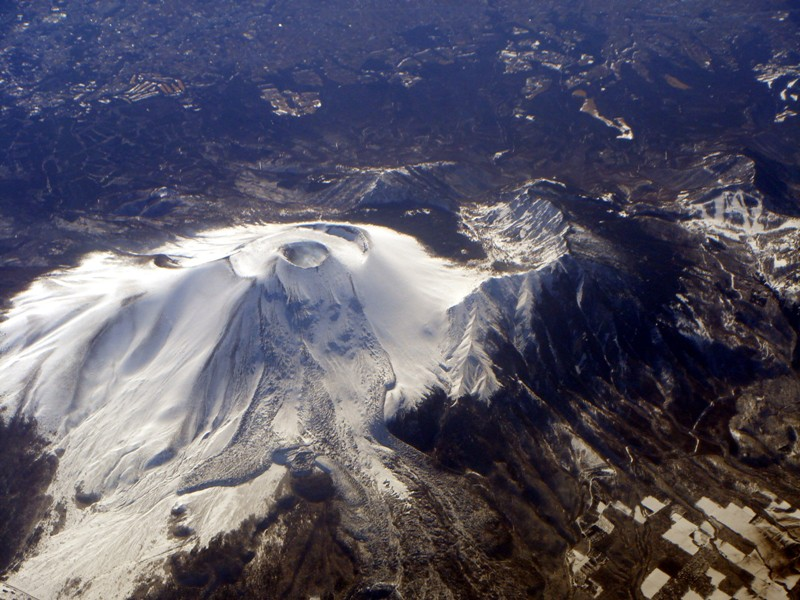
Viewed from the north

Scientists from the University of Tokyo and Nagoya University completed their first successful imaging experiment of the interior of the volcano in April 2007. By detecting sub-atomic particles called muons as they passed through the volcano after arriving from space, the scientists were able gradually to build up a picture of the interior, creating images of cavities through which lava was passing deep inside the volcano.

A University of Tokyo volcano observatory is located on the mountain's east slope. Volcanic gas emissions from this volcano are measured by a Multi-Component Gas Analyzer System, which detects pre-eruptive degassing of rising magmas, improving prediction of volcanic activity.

There is also another mountain called Asama (朝熊山, Asama-yama) of only 555 meters in Mie Prefecture.

== Eruptive history ==
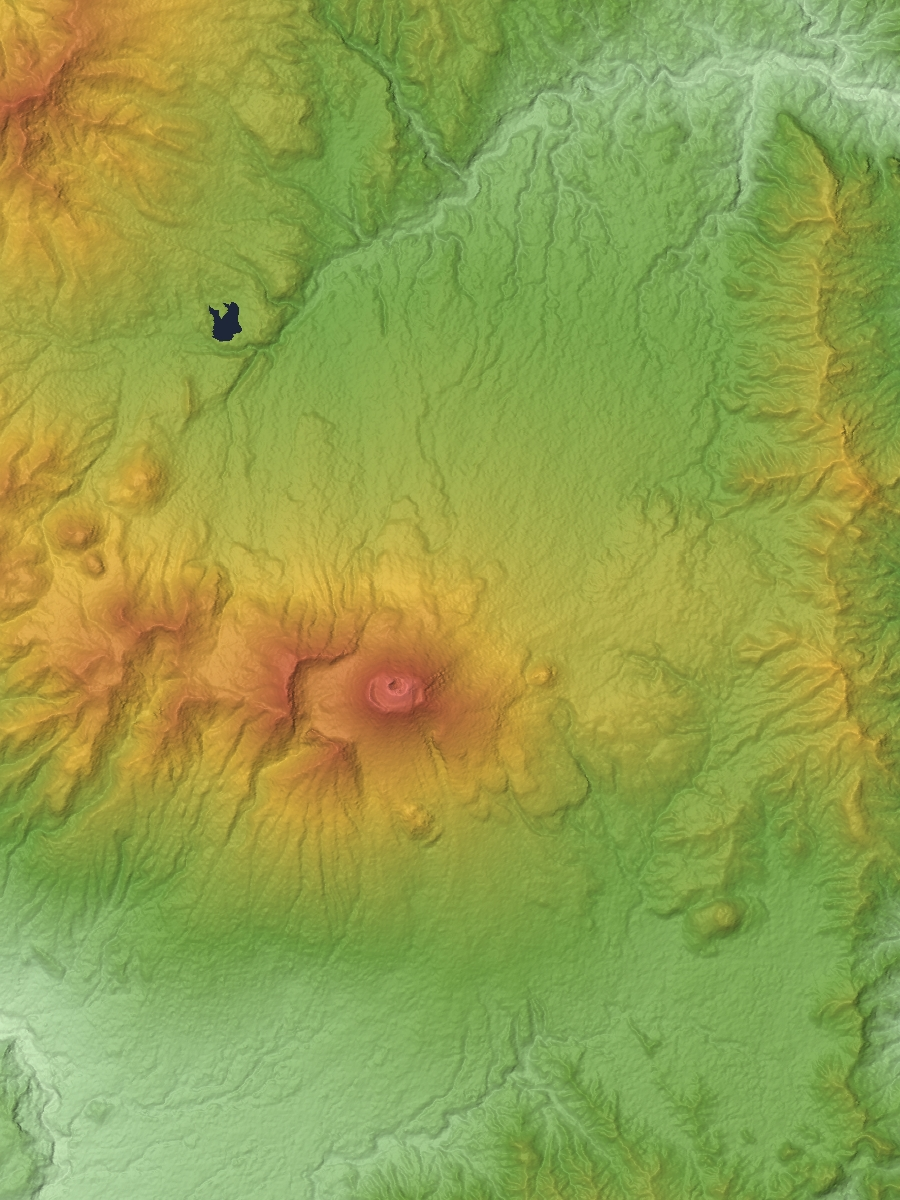
Relief map

The geologic features of this active volcano are closely monitored with seismographs and strategically positioned video cameras. Scientists have noted a range of textural variety in the ash which has been deposited in the region during the serial eruptions since the Tennin eruption of 1108.

=== Tennin eruption (1108) ===
The eruption of Mount Asama in 1108 (Tennin 1) has been the subject of studies by modern science. Records suggest that the magnitude of this plinian eruption was twice as large as that of the Tenmei catastrophe in 1783.

A Swiss research team found Mount Asama's volcanic eruption could have contributed to extreme weather that caused severe famine, torrential rain and consecutive cold summers in Europe. They studied ice cores in Greenland which had increased sulfate deposition in 1108 CE. In the late Heian Period (794–1185) the diary of the court noble Fujiwara no Munetada reported that Mount Asama erupted on 29 August 1108. He wrote that a local report described rice paddies and fields could not be farmed due to being covered by a thick layer of ash.

=== Tenmei eruption (1783) ===
Mount Asama erupted in 1783 (Tenmei 3), causing widespread damage. The three-month-long plinian eruption that began on 9 May 1783, produced andesitic pumice falls, pyroclastic flows, lava flows, and enlarged the cone. The climactic eruption began on 4 August and lasted for 15 hours, and contained pumice falls and pyroclastic flows. The complex features of this eruption are explained by rapid deposits of coarse pyroclastic ash near the vent and the subsequent flows of lava; and these events which were accompanied by a high eruption plume which generated further injections of pumice into the air.

=== 1982 eruption ===
Explosive eruptions occurred at the summit of Asama volcano on 26 April. Fine ash fell in Tokyo, 130 km (80 mi) to the SE, for the first time in 23 years.

=== 1983 eruptions ===
An explosive eruption occurred on 8 April. Incandescent tephra was ejected, and ash fell 250 km (160 mi) from the volcano.

=== 1995 earthquakes ===
In April 1995, more than 1000 earthquakes were detected at the volcanic mountain.

=== 2004 eruption ===
A single vulcanian eruption occurred at Asama volcano at 11:02 UT on 1 September 2004. Incandescent blocks were ejected from the summit and caused many fires. The eruption sent ash and rock as far away as 200 km (120 mi).

=== 2008 eruptions ===
Three small ash eruptions occurred at Asama volcano in August 2008. This was the first activity at the volcano since 2004.

=== 2009 eruptions ===
Mount Asama erupted in early February 2009, sending ash to a height of 2 km (6,600 ft), and throwing rocks up to 1 km (0.62 mi) from the crater. Ash fall was reported in Tokyo, 145 km (90 mi) southeast of the volcano crater. On 16 February there were 13 recorded volcanic earthquakes and an eruption emitting smoke and ash in a cloud 400 m (1,300 ft) high.

Mount Asama continued to have small eruptions, tremors and earthquakes in February and remained on level-3 alert, with a danger zone within 4 km (2.5 mi) of the crater.

=== 2019 eruption ===
A small eruption occurred on August 7th, 2019, with smoke reaching about 1,800 meters above the mountain.

=== Marking the span of Japan's history ===
The eruptions of Mount Asama mark the span of Japan's recorded history, including: 2019, 2009, 2008, 2004, 2003, 1995, 1990, 1983, 1982, 1973, 1965, 1961, 1958–59, 1953–55, 1952, 1952, 1950–51, 1949, 1947, 1946, 1944–45, 1938–42, 1935–37, 1934, 1934, 1933, 1931–32, 1930, 1929, 1929, 1927–28, 1924, 1922, 1920–21, 1919, 1918?, 1917, 1916, 1915, 1914, 1909–14, 1908, 1908, 1907, 1907, 1906, 1905?, 1904, 1903, 1902, 1902, 1900–01, 1899, 1899, 1894, 1889, 1879, 1878?, 1875, 1869, 1815, 1803, 1803, 1783, 1779?, 1777, 1776, 1769, 1762, 1755, 1754, 1733, 1732, 1731, 1729, 1729, 1728, 1723, 1723, 1722, 1721, 1720, 1719, 1718, 1717, 1711, 1710, 1708–09, 1706, 1704, 1703, 1669, 1661, 1661, 1660, 1659, 1658, 1657, 1656, 1655, 1653, 1652, 1651, 1650?, 1649, 1648, 1648, 1647, 1645, 1644, 1609, 1605, 1604, 1600, 1598, 1597, 1596, 1596, 1595?, 1591, 1590, 1532, 1528, 1527, 1518, 1427?, 1281, 1108, 887, 685.

Note: The dates of eruptions featured in this article appear in bold italics.

== Onioshidashi ==
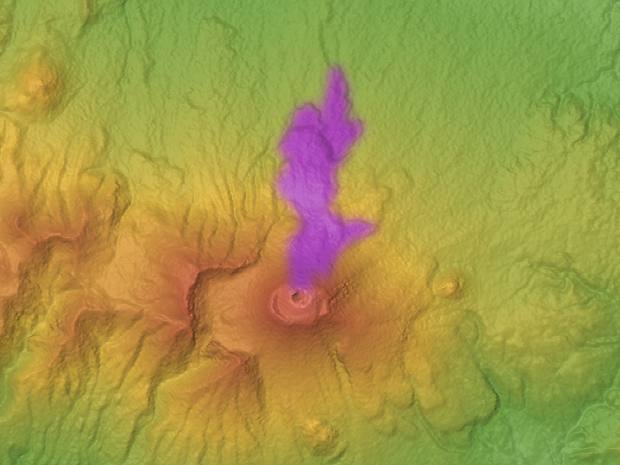
Map of Onioshidashi lava flow

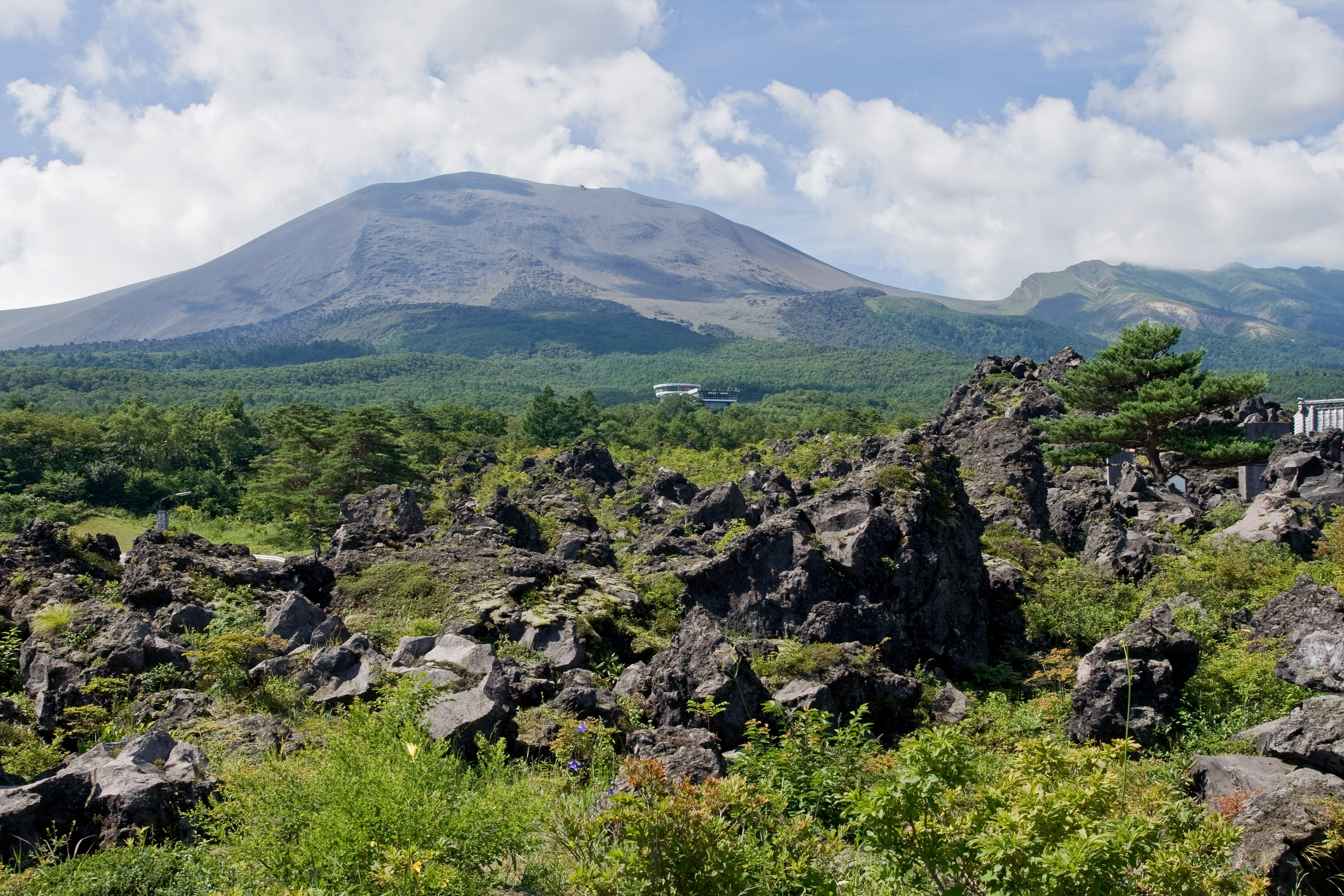
Onioshidashi lava flow on the southern foot (erupted in 1783)

Onioshidashi (Japanese: 鬼押出し) "expelling demons" is the name of a lava flow on the northern slope of Mount Asama. The lava flow that erupted in 1783 Tenmei eruption was solidified. Now, it is known as a tourist destination.

== Asama Volcano Museum ==
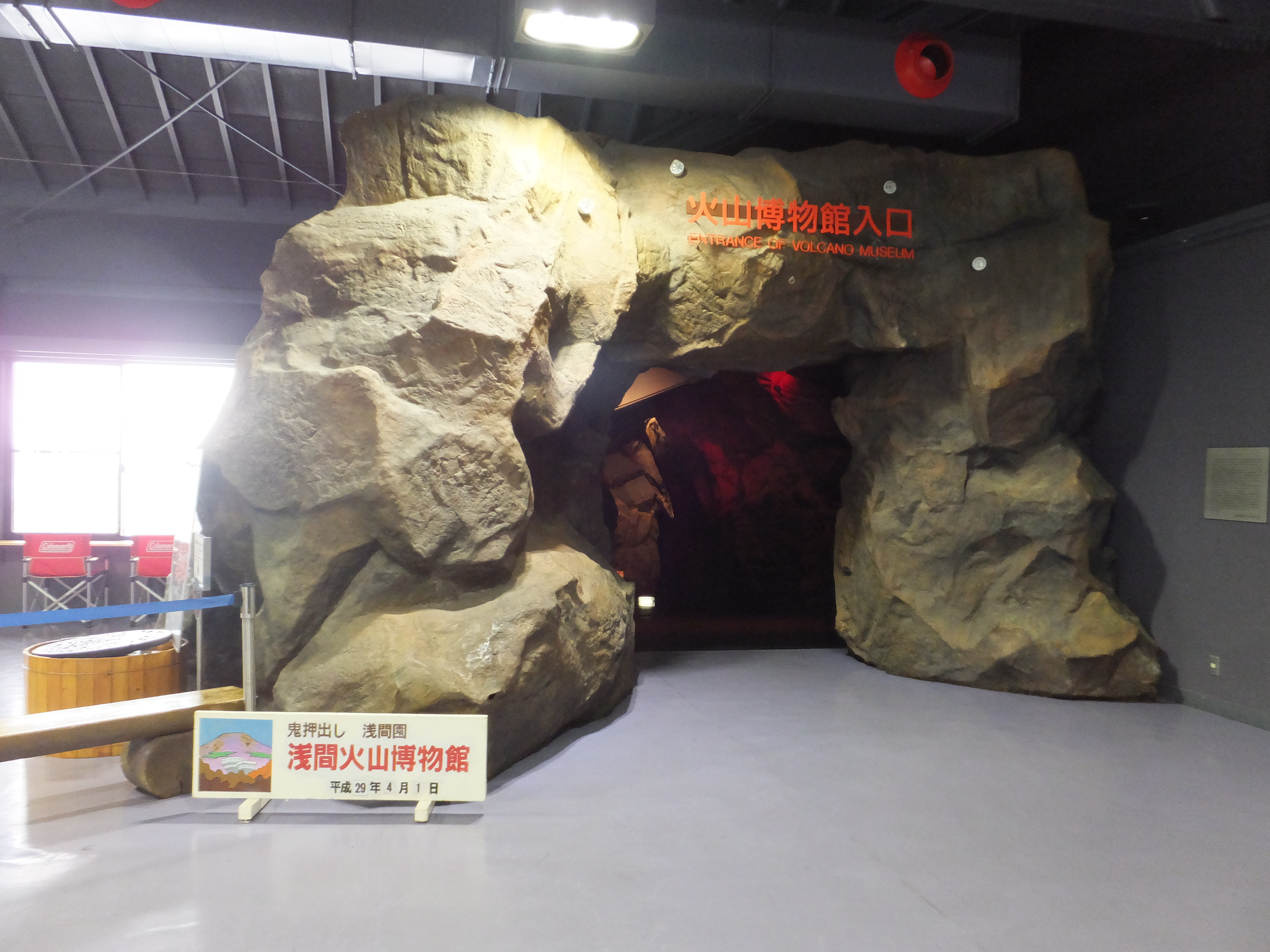
Asama Volcano Museum

The Asama Volcano Museum (浅間火山博物館), 4 km (2.5 mi) from the crater of the Mount Asama, open from 1993 to 2020, explained volcanoes.

The museum was in Naganohara-machi, Agatsuma-gun, Gunma Prefecture. As of early 2009, it was open from April until November.

Visitor numbers peaked at 265,000 in 1994; however, seismic activity at nearby Mount Asama was one reason for frequent closures. The closures were a factor in the drop in visitors: this gradually fell to 23,000. In the later years of the museum, most of the visitors were on school excursions. The museum was running a deficit of about 17 million yen per year, paid for by the town of Naganohara. Additionally, the building was ageing, and maintenance threatened to cost hundreds of millions of yen.

A nearby building, Asama memorial hall (浅間記念館) exhibited motorbikes; the plan in summer 2020 was to move these to a municipally owned tourist facility, Asama pasture (浅間牧場), and to move some of the exhibits of the volcano museum to the memorial hall.

== Gallery ==
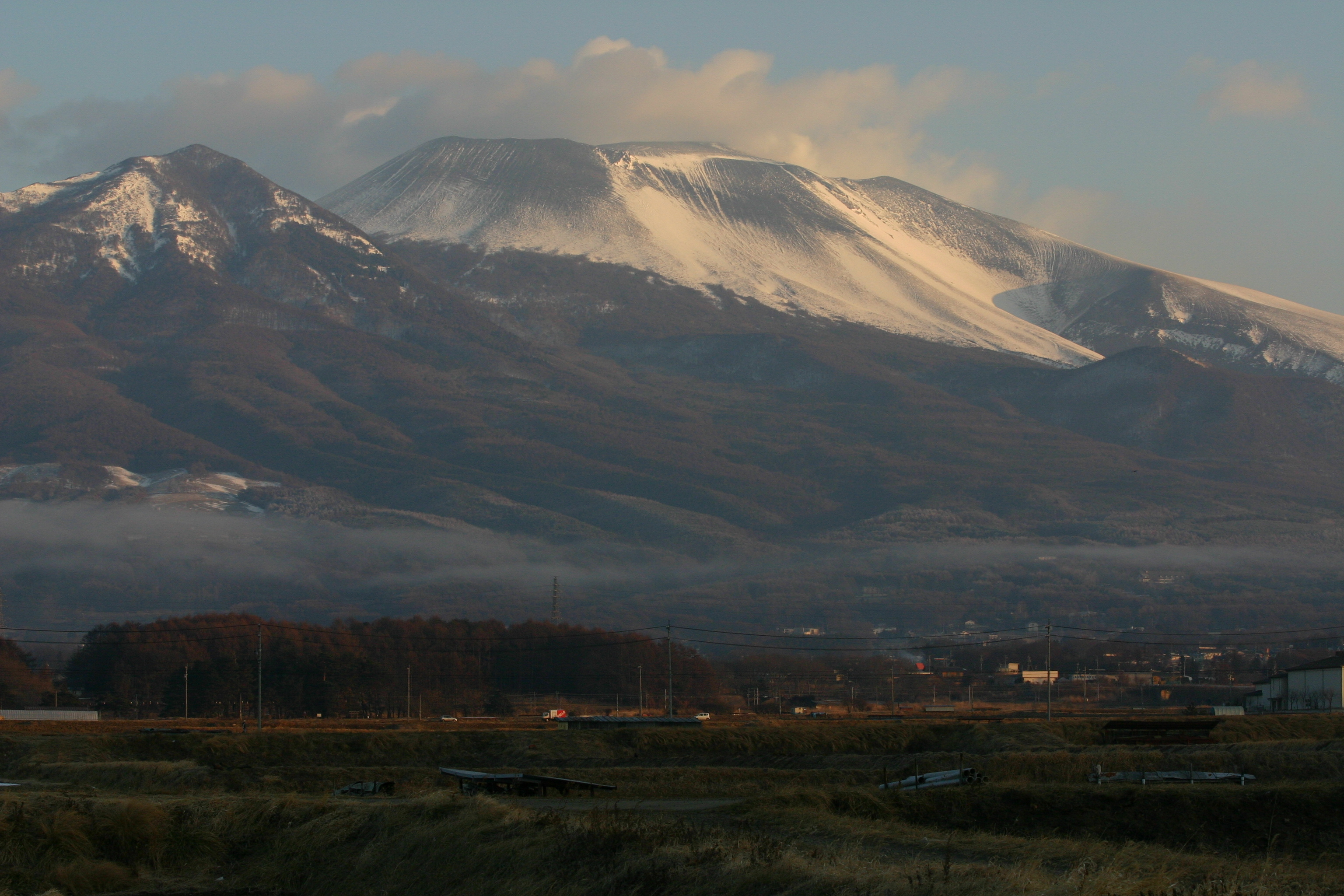
Viewed from the south

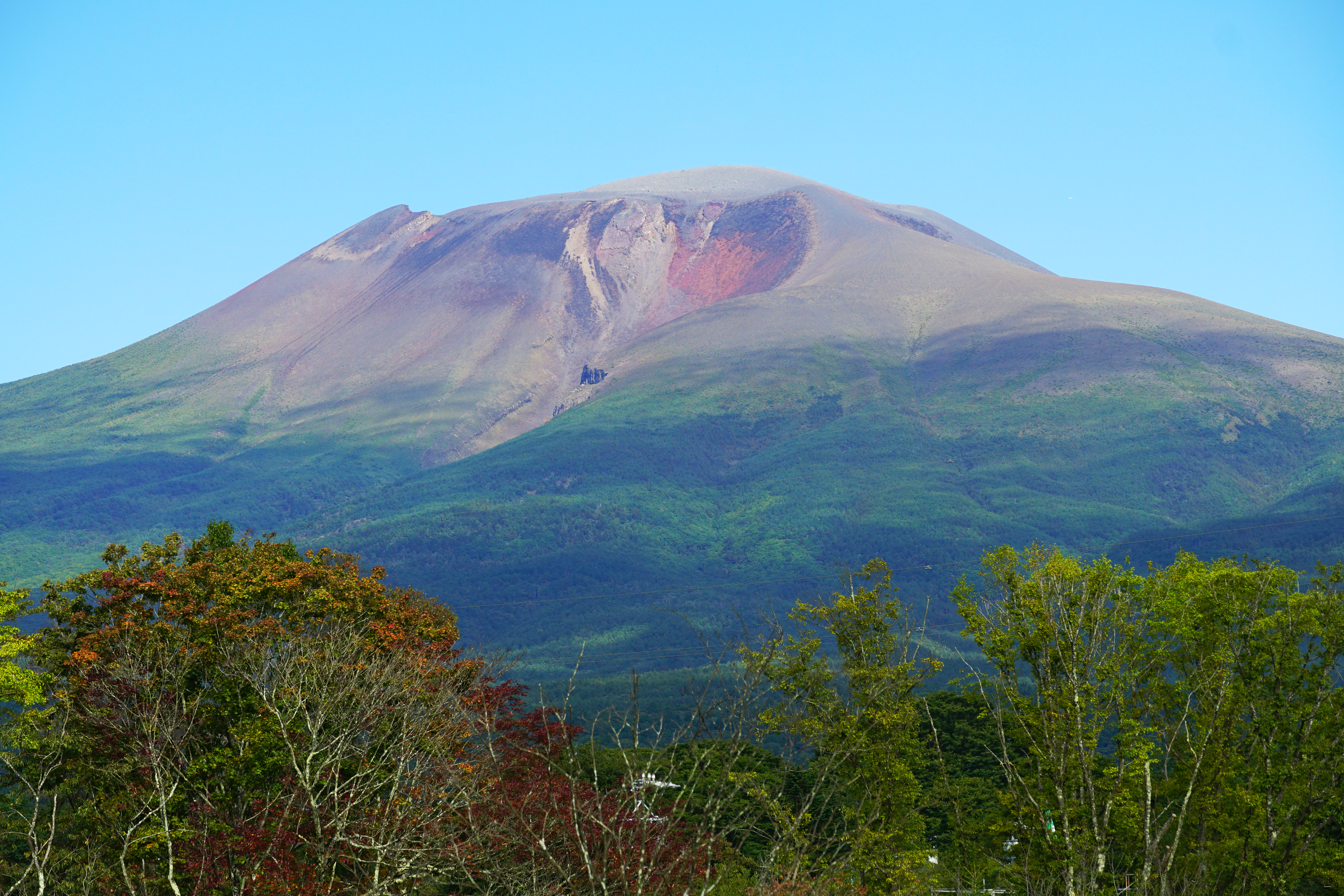
Viewed from the southeast

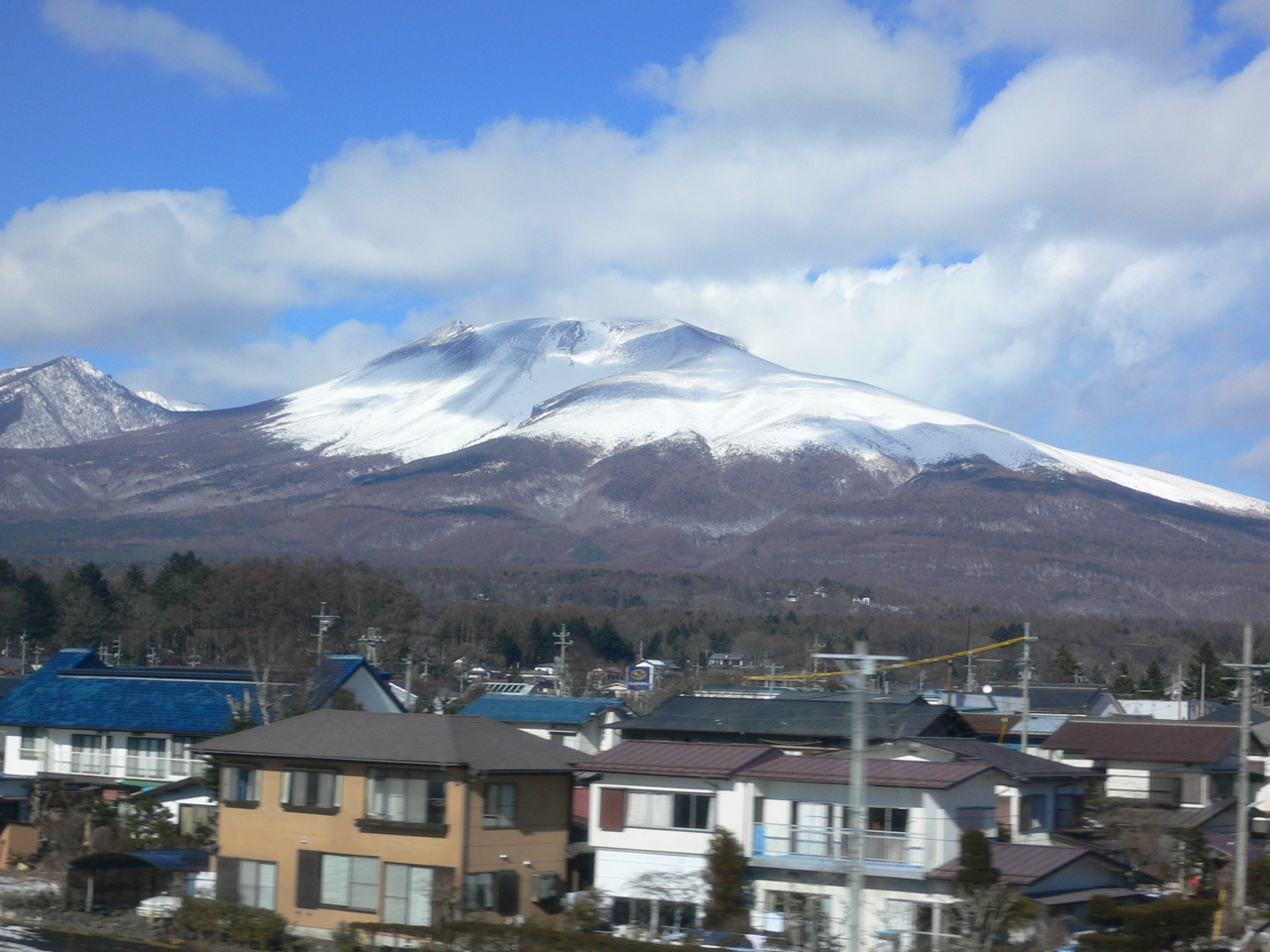
Viewed from the SSE

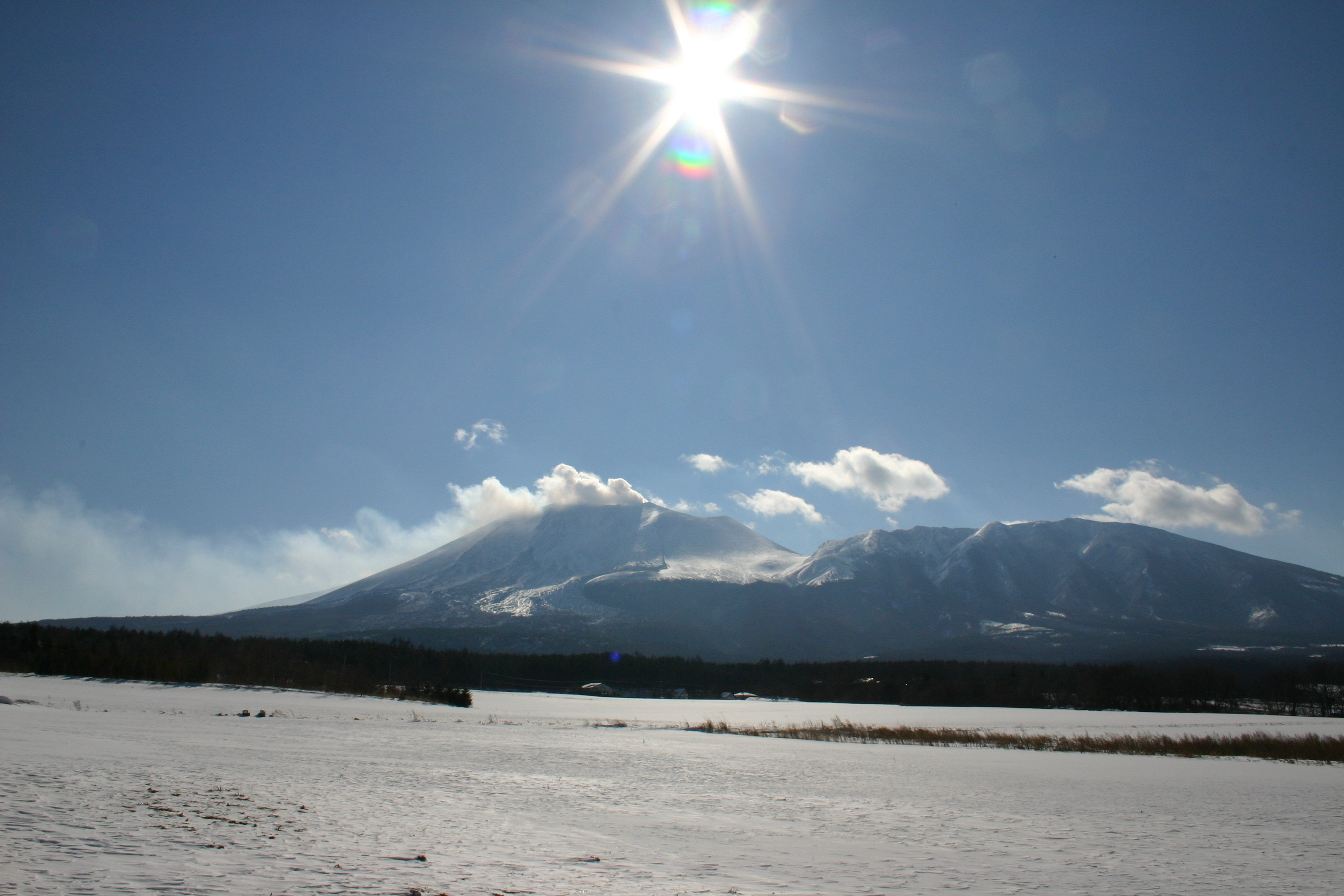
Viewed from the north

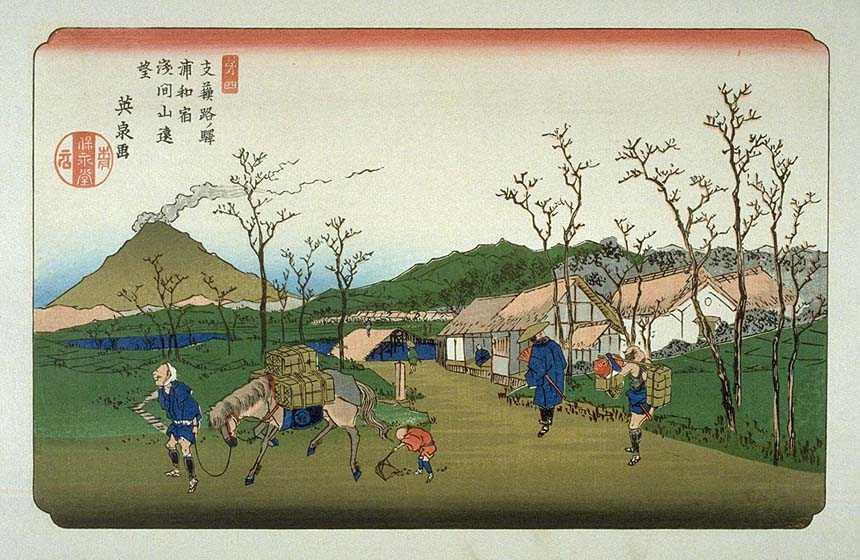
Hiroshige

== In popular culture ==
Mount Asama served as the backdrop to Japan's first colour film, Carmen Comes Home. Several references are made to Mount Asama throughout the film, including a melody composed by a blind composer, Mr. Taguchi.

In the anime Neon Genesis Evangelion, the Eighth Angel, Sandalphon, was located inside Mount Asama.

Masashi Matsuie's novel Kazan no fumoto de (literally At the Foot of the Volcano, published in the USA as The Summer House and in the UK as Summer At Mount Asama), which received the Yomiuri Prize for Literature in 2012, takes place in a village at the foot of Mount Asama.

The main story of Touhou 20 ~ Fossilized Wonders takes place in the Asama Purifying Mountain, which is based on Mount Asama.

== See also ==
- Tenmei eruption
