= Konoe =

Konoe (written: 近衛 or 近衞) is a Japanese surname. It is sometimes spelled "Konoye" based on historical kana usage. Notable people with the surname include:

- Emperor Konoe (近衛天皇; 1139–1155), the 76th emperor of Japan
- Konoe Atsumaro (近衛 篤麿; 1863–1904), Japanese politician and journalist
- Fumimaro Konoe (近衞 文麿; 1891–1945), Japanese politician and the 34th, 38th and 39th Prime Minister of Japan
- Konoe Fusatsugu (近衛 房嗣; 1402–1488), Japanese kugyō
- Hidemaro Konoye (近衛 秀麿; 1898–1973), Japanese classical composer and conductor
- Konoe Hisamichi (近衛 尚通; 1472–1544), Japanese kugyō
- Konoe Hisatsugu (近衛 尚嗣; 1622–1653), Japanese kugyō
- Konoe Iehira (近衛 家平; 1282–1324), Japanese kugyō
- Konoe Iehiro (近衛 家熈; 1667–1736), Japanese kugyō
- Konoe Iehisa (近衛 家久; 1687–1737), Japanese kugyō
- Konoe Iemoto (近衛 家基; 1261–1296), Japanese kugyō
- Konoe Iezane (近衛 家実; 1179–1243), Japanese kugyō
- Konoe Kanetsugu (近衛 兼嗣; 1360–1388), Japanese kugyō
- Konoe Kanetsune (近衛 兼経; 1210–1259), Japanese kugyō
- Jūshirō Konoe (近衛 十四郎; 1914–1977), Japanese actor
- Konoe Masaie (近衛 政家; 1445–1505), Japanese kugyō
- Konoe Michitsugu (近衛 道嗣; 1333–1387), Japanese kugyō
- Konoe Motohira (近衛 基平; 1246–1268), Japanese kugyō
- Konoe Motohiro (近衛 基熈; 1648–1722), Japanese kugyō
- Konoe Motomichi (近衛 基通; 1160–1233), Japanese kugyō
- Konoe Motosaki (近衛 基前; 1783–1820), Japanese kugyō
- Konoe Mototsugu (近衛 基嗣; 1305–1354), Japanese kugyō
- Konoe Motozane (近衛 基実; 1143–1166), Japanese kugyō
- Konoe Nobuhiro (近衛 信尋; 1599–1649), Japanese kugyō
- Konoe Nobutada (近衛 信尹; 1565–1614), Japanese courtier, poet, calligrapher, painter and diarist
- Konoe Sakihisa (近衛 前久; 1536–1612), Japanese kuge
- Konoe Tadafusa (近衛 忠房; 1838–1873), Japanese kugyō
- Konoe Tadahiro (近衛 忠熙; 1808–1898), Japanese kugyō
- Tadateru Konoe (近衛 忠煇; 1939–2026), Japanese humanitarian, president of the International Federation of Red Cross and Red Crescent Societies
- Konoe Tadatsugu (近衛 忠嗣; 1383–1454), Japanese kugyō
- Konoe Taneie (近衛 稙家; 1503–1566), Japanese kugyō
- Konoe Tsunehira (近衛 経平; 1287–1318), Japanese kugyō
- Konoe Tsunehiro (近衛 経熙; 1761–1799), Japanese kugyō
- Konoe Tsunetada (近衛 経忠; 1302–1352), Japanese kugyō
- Konoe Uchisaki (近衛 内前; 1728–1785), Japanese kugyō
- Yasuko Konoe (近衛 甯子; born 1944), Japanese princess

== See also ==
- Konoe family, a branch of the Fujiwara family
