= Konoe family =

Branch of the Hokke Clan

Konoe 近衛
- Parent house: Fujiwara clan (Hokke)
- Titles: Various
- Founder: Konoe Motozane
- Founding year: 12th century
- Dissolution: still extant
- Cadet branches: Takatsukasa family; Tokiwai family; Miyagawa family

Konoe (近衛) is a Japanese aristocratic family. The family is a branch of Hokke and, by extension, a main branch of the Fujiwara clan.

== History ==
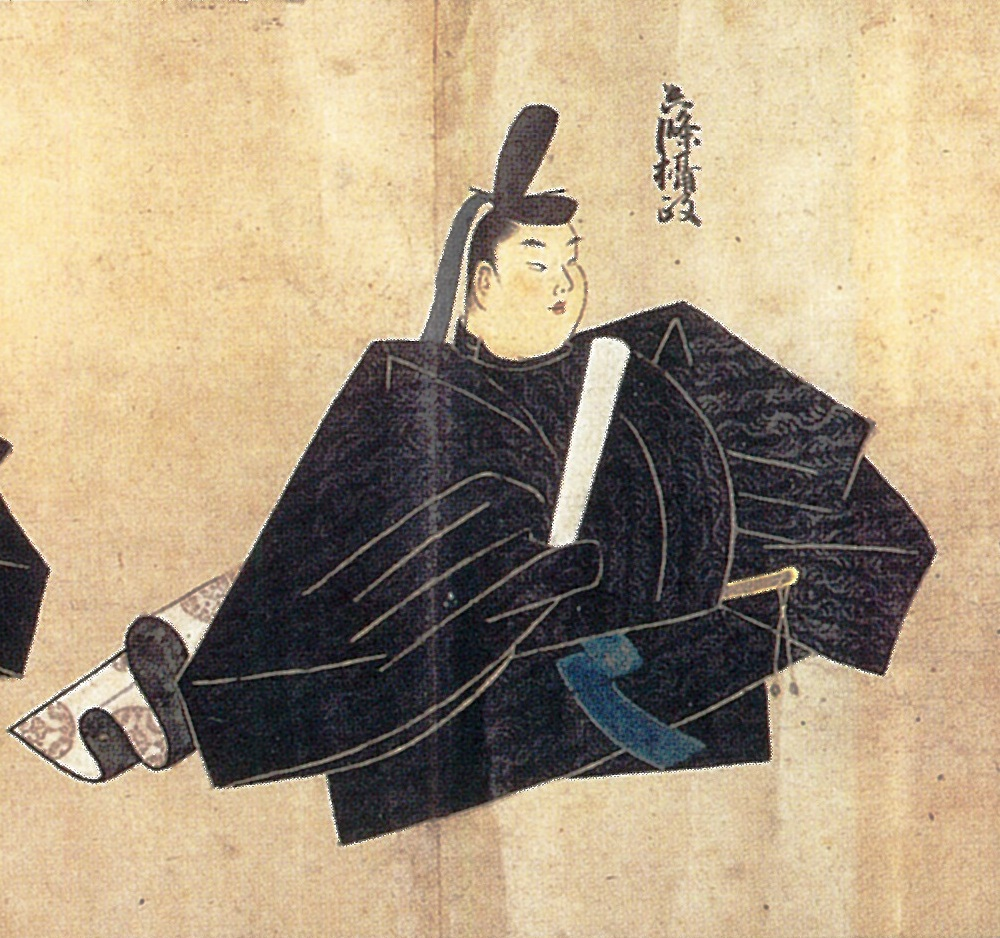
Konoe Motozane, founder of the Konoe family

The Konoe claim descent from Konoe Iezane (1179–1242). The origin of the family name was the residence of Iezane's grandfather Konoe Motozane, which was located on a road in Kyoto named "Konoe-Ōji" (近衛大道). Despite Konoe at first being the senior line of the Fujiwara clan, the clan was eventually split up into Five regent houses during the Kamakura period, with each of the five families having the right to assume the regency. During the following Nanboku-chō period, a succession dispute of Konoe emerged, between Tsunetada and his cousin Mototsugu – they served in rival courts, the Southern and the Northern Court respectively; later, when the Southern court lost its political influence in 1392, records of Tsunetada's descendants became lost and have stayed lost ever since.

There were at least five Imperial Consorts who came from the Konoe family, including Konoe Sakiko, who was adopted by Toyotomi Hideyoshi in 1586. The most recent consort from the Konoe was Konoe Koreko (近衛維子, 1760–1783), who married the 118th Emperor of Japan, Emperor Go-Momozono; they had one daughter Princess Yoshiko.

In the early 17th century the Konoe family was imperiled, for Konoe Nobutada was the last of his line and had no male heir. He decided to adopt one of his nephews, who was also the fourth son of Emperor Go-Yozei. The child was renamed Konoe Nobuhiro (1599–1649), who later married Nobutada's daughter. From there the Konoe lineage was renewed and continued until 1956, when the eldest son of Prime Minister Fumimaro Konoe, Fumitaka, died in the Soviet Union without a legitimate male heir. Fumitaka's wife subsequently adopted his nephew Tadateru Konoe, second son of Fumitaka's sister, as their heir. Tadateru's patrilineal descent, through his biological father Morisada Hosokawa, comes from the Hosokawa clan, a cadet branch of Seiwa Genji and descended from Emperor Seiwa; he also has an elder brother Morihiro Hosokawa, the Prime Minister of Japan from 1993 to 1994. Tadateru married, in 1966, a granddaughter of Emperor Taishō, Yasuko (formerly Princess Yasuko of Mikasa).

== Family Tree ==
adoption
Fujiwara no Tadamichi (1097–1164)
Motozane^{(1)} (1143–1166)	Matsudono Motofusa (1144–1230)	Kujō Kanezane (1149–1207)
Motomichi^{(2)} (1160–1233)	Kujō family
Iezane^{(3)} (1179–1243)
Kanetsune^{(4)} (1210–1259)	Takatsukasa Kanehira (1228–1294)
Motohira^{(5)} (1246–1268)	Takatsukasa family
Iemoto^{(6)} (1261–1296)
Iehira^{(7)} (1282–1324)	Tsunehira^{(9)} (1287–1318)
Tsunetada^{(8)} (1302–1352)	Mototsugu (1305–1354)
Michitsugu^{(10)} (1333–1387)
Kanetsugu^{(11)} (1360–1388)
Tadatsugu^{(12)} (1383–1454)
Fusatsugu^{(13)} (1402–1488)
Masaie^{(14)} (1445–1505)
Hisamichi^{(15)} (1472–1544)
Taneie^{(16)} (1503–1566)	Koga Harumichi (1519–1575)
Sakihisa^{(17)} (1536–1612)
Nobutada^{(18)} (1565–1614)	Sakiko (1575–1630)	Emperor Go-Yōzei (1571–1617)
Emperor Go-Mizunoo (1596–1680)	Nobuhiro^{(19)} (1599–1649)	Ichijō Akiyoshi (1605–1672)
Hisatsugu^{(20)} (1622–1653)
Motohiro^{(21)} (1648–1722)
Iehiro^{(22)} (1667–1736)	Ōinomikado Nobuna (1669–1684)
Iehisa^{(23)} (1687–1737)	Takatsukasa Fusahiro (1710–1730)	Takatsukasa Hisasuke (1726–1733)
Uchisaki^{(24)} (1728–1785)
Tsunehiro^{(25)} (1761–1799)
Motosaki^{(26)} (1783–1820)
Tadahiro^{(27)} (1808–1898)
Tadafusa^{(28)} (1838–1873)	Tokiwai Gyōki (1844–1919)	Miyagawa Tadaoki (1848–1923)
Atsumaro^{(29)} (1863–1904)	Tokiwai family	Miyagawa family
Fumimaro^{(30)} (1891–1945)
Fumitaka^{(31)} (1915–1956)	Hosokawa Yoshiko (1918–1940)	Hosokawa Morisada (1912–2005)
Tadateru^{(32)} (1939-2026)
Tadahiro (b. 1970)

=== Tokiwai family ===
The Tokiwai family (常磐井家, Tokiwai-ke) was founded by a son of Konoe Tadahiro, Gyōki (尭熈), who was the lead Buddhist monk of Senju-ji, and he took the family name "Tokiwai" since 1872.

Konoe Tadahiro (1808–1898)
Konoe Tadafusa (1838–1873)	Gyōki^{(1)} 尭熈 (1844–1919)
Gyōyū^{(2)} 尭猷 (1873–1952)
Gyōki^{(3)} 尭祺 (1905–1992)	Ran'yū^{(4)} 鸞猷 (b. 1932)
Jishō^{(5)} 慈祥 (b. 1959)

=== Miyagawa family ===
Konoe Tadahiro (1808–1898)
Konoe Tadafusa (1838–1873)	Tadaoki^{(1)} (1848–1923)
Konoe Atsumaro (1863–1904)
Hidemaro Konoye (1898–1973)	Tadamaro^{(2)} (1902–1961)
Konoe Hidetake (1931–2003)	Tadatoshi^{(3)} (b. 1935)
Johann Sebastian Paetsch (b. 1964)	Yoko Miyagawa Paetsch (b. 1964)	Yuko (b. 1968)	Mark Gothóni

== See also ==
- Japanese clans
- List of Kuge families
- Five Regent Houses
- Kujō family
- Fujiwara family tree
