= Tadatoshi Miyagawa =

Japanese composer

- 水谷川忠俊
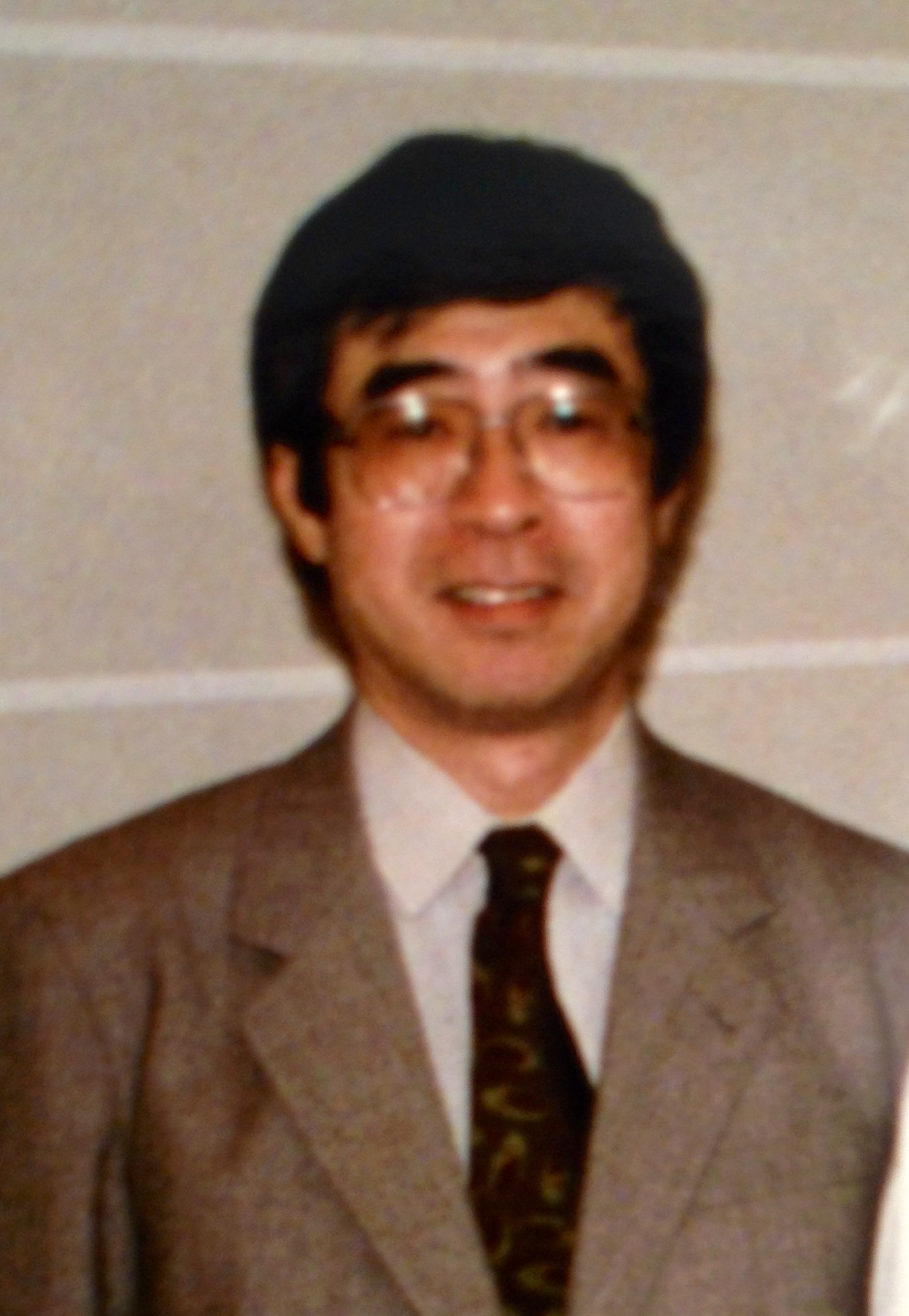
- Tadatoshi Miyagawa in 1994.
- Born: Konoe Toshitake; 9 December 1935; Osaka, Higashi-ku, Kyuhoji, Japan
- Education: Madrid Royal Conservatory; Berlin Municipal Conservatory of Music
- Occupations: Composer; Gagaku performer and researcher; music arranger
- Spouse: Sakiko Ano (m. 1964)
- Children: Yoko Miyagawa; Yuko Miyagawa
- Father: Hidemaro Konoye
- Relatives: Atsumaro Konoe (grandfather); Fumimaro Konoe (uncle); Johann Sebastian Paetsch (son-in-law)

Tadatoshi Miyagawa (水谷川忠俊, Miyagawa Tadatoshi; born 9 December 1935) is a Japanese composer, a Gagaku performer and researcher, as well as a music arranger. His former last and first name was Konoe Toshitake (近衛俊健). He is a 13th generation Patrilinear descendant, also known as the male line, of Emperor Go-Yōzei, Emperor of Japan.

== Career ==
He was born in the city of Osaka, Higashi-ku, Kyuhoji as the second son (illegitimate child) to Hidemaro Konoye of the Konoe family. His mother was Fumiko Tsuboi (坪井文子). His father, Hidemaro, registered his birth certificate at the East Ward (Higashiku) city hall in Osaka on 22 July 1937.

On 19 October 1939, he was adopted by the youngest brother of his father Tadamaro Miyagawa (水谷川忠麿) and he was renamed Tadatoshi (忠俊). His youngest memory was being in an atelier of Tadamaro in Sendagaya, Tokyo and has no recollection of his real birth mother. While he was studying at the Gakushūin Elementary School they moved to Nara and he went to the elementary school (co-ed) which is attached to the women University in Nara and he also finished junior high and high school at the same school. Upon graduating high school he moved back to Tokyo and became assistant to Naozumi Yamamoto who is a composer and conductor.

In August 1962, he passed the exam to be a full scholarship student at the Madrid Royal Conservatory of Music in Spain. In 1963, he studied in the Berlin Municipal Conservatory of Music (which is now the Berlin University of the Arts, or UdK). His first daughter, Yoko, was born in Berlin, West Germany. In 1968, he returned to Japan just before his second daughter, Yuko, was born.

His brother Hidetake Konoe is also a composer and conductor. His wife, Sakiko, is the daughter of viscount Suefusa Ano (阿野季房) from the Ano family of Northern Fujiwara clan. Sakiko was a classmate of his from the Gakushūin Elementary School in Tokyo where the children of the Imperial aristocracy (Kuge) were educated. His oldest daughter, Yoko Miyagawa, is a violinist and his second daughter Yuko Miyagawa is a cellist.

== Movies ==
=== Folk song ===
Summer Festival them song fr:Matsumoto Bon Bon

=== TV drama music ===
- TBS "Yasubee's Ocean" (1969–1970)
- Fuji TV "White Terror" (1975)
- NHK "New Western circumstances (3) Miso soup fanatics go to Europe" (1977)
- TV Tokyo "The Dangerous Evening that Wives Bought" (1988)

== Ancestry ==
=== Miyagawa family ===
The Miyagawa family traces its origins to Takaoki Miyagawa, the son of Tadahiro Konoe, and was listed as a member of the Nara aristocracy.

for further information see: Miyagawa family

=== Konoe family ===
The Konoe family was founded by Konoe Motozane, the son of Fujiwara no Tadamichi, and was one of the Five regent houses in Japan.

for further information see: Konoe family

=== Relationship with the Imperial family ===
Emperor Goyozei	Emperor Go-Mizunoo	Empress Meishō
Emperor Go-Kōmyō
Emperor Go-Sai
Emperor Reigen	Emperor Higashiyama	Emperor Nakamikado	Emperor Sakuramachi	Emperor Momozono	Emperor Go-Momozono
直仁親王	典仁親王	Emperor Kōkaku	Emperor Ninkō	Emperor Kōmei	Emperor Meiji	Emperor Taishō	Hirohito	Akihito
Konoe Nobuhiro	Konoe Hisatsugu	Konoe Motohiro	Konoe Iehiro	Konoe Iehisa	Konoe Uchisaki	Konoe Tsunehiro	Konoe Motosaki	Konoe Tadahiro	Konoe Tadafusa	Atsumaro Konoe	Fumimaro Konoe
Hidemaro Konoye	Hidetake Konoe
Tadatoshi Miyagawa

- Because there are many relatives, only the successive emperors from Emperor Go-Yōzei onwards and related male descendants are listed. Therefore, the maternal family tree is omitted.
- His ancestor, Konoe Nobuhiro, was born as the fourth son of Emperor Goyozei, was adopted by Konoe Nobutada, and inherited the Konoe family line.
- His father, Hidemaro Konoye, was born as the son of Konoe Atsumaro and established a branch family.

As a patrilineal descendant of the Konoe family, Miyagawa is a nephew of former Japanese Prime Minister Konoe Fumimaro, and is a first cousin once removed of both the former prime minister Hosokawa Morihiro and his brother Tadateru Konoe. By virtue of his descent from the Konoe family, he is related to the Japanese imperial family, being a descendant of Emperor Go-Yōzei.

Ancestors of Tadatoshi Miyagawa

8. Prince Konoe Tadafusa (1838–1873)
4. Prince Konoe Atsumaro (1863–1904)
9. Shimazu Mitsuko
2. Viscount Konoe Hidemaro (1898–1973)
10. Maeda Yoshiyasu, 14th Lord of Kaga (1830–1874)
5. Maeda Sawako (1871–1945)
11. Hisanori NN
1. Miyagawa Tadatoshi
3. Tsuboi Fumiko (1901–?)
