= Tokugawa Munemoto =

Japanese daimyō

Lord of Mito
- In office 1728–1766
- Preceded by: Tokugawa Munetaka
- Succeeded by: Tokugawa Harumori

Personal details
- Born: September 3, 1728
- Died: March 24, 1766 (aged 37)

Tokugawa Munemoto (徳川 宗翰; September 3, 1728 – March 24, 1766) was a Japanese daimyō of the mid-Edo period who ruled the Mito Domain. His childhood name was Tsuruchiyo (鶴千代).

== Family ==
- Father: Tokugawa Munetaka
- Mother: Miyohime (1708-1746)
- Wife: Ikuko, daughter of Ichijo Kaneka
- Concubines:
  - Sakakibara-dono
  - Onoue no Kata
  - Segawa-dono
  - Mori-dono
  - Iwakura-dono
  - Miyake-dono
  - Fukatsu-dono
- Children:
  - Tokugawa Harumori (1751-1805) by Sakakibara
  - Naojiro By Onoue
  - Naonosuke by Onoue
  - Katsugoro by Sakakibara
  - Tokihime by Segawa married Matsudaira Yoshisuke of Takasu Domain
  - Matsudaira Yorisuke (1756-1839) of Shishido Domain by Segawa
  - Matsudaira Yoriyuki by Mori
  - Yoshihime married Nijo Harutaka by Iwakura
  - Kunihime married Imadegawa Sanetane by Iwakura
  - Minehime become nun by Iwakura
  - 2 sons by Miyake
  - Nakayama Nobutaka (1765-1820) by Miyake
  - Kinhime become nun by Fukatsu

== Ancestry ==
Ancestors of Tokugawa Munemoto

16. Matsudaira Yorishige, 1st Lord of Takamatsu (1622-1695)
8. Matsudaira Yoritoshi (1661-1687)
17. Kabashima Matsuno
4. Matsudaira Yoritoyo, 3rd Lord of Takamatsu (1680-1735)
18. Higuchi Nobuyasu (1623-1691)
9. Higuchi Nanahime
2. Tokugawa Munetaka, 4th Lord of Mito (1705-1730)
5. Yuasa Satoryō-in
1. Tokugawa Munemoto, 5th Lord of Mito
24. Matsudaira Yorishige, 1st Lord of Takamatsu (1622-1695)
12. Tokugawa Tsunaeda, 3rd Lord of Mito (1656-1718)
25. Doi Manhime
6. Tokugawa Yoshizane (1685-1709)
13. Ide
3. Tokugawa Miyohime (1708-1746)
28. Takatsukasa Fusasuke (1637-1700)
14. Takatsukasa Sukenobu (1683-1734)
7. Takatsukasa Yaehime (1689-1746)

Preceded by Tokugawa Munetaka	Daimyō of Mito; 1728-1766	Succeeded by Tokugawa Harumori
