= Hidemaro Konoye =

Japanese conductor (1898–1973)

- 近衞 秀麿
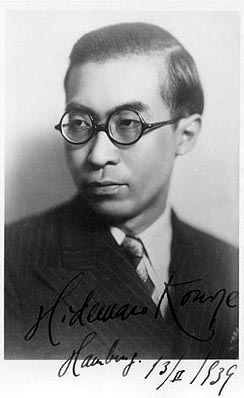
- Konoye Hidemaro in 1939 signed photo from Hamburg Philharmonic
- Born: Hidemaro Konoye; 18 November 1898; Kojimachi-ku, Tokyo, Empire of Japan
- Died: 2 June 1973 (aged 74); Noge, Setagaya, Tokyo, Japan
- Education: Tokyo Imperial University, Faculty of Arts dropout
- Occupations: Conductor, composer, music arranger
- Years active: 1920–1973
- Children: Hidetake Konoe; Tadatoshi Miyagawa
- Parents: Konoe Atsumaro (father); Maeda Sadako (mother)
- Relatives: Tadamaro Miyagawa (brother); Naomaro Konoye (brother); Fumimaro Konoe (brother)

Viscount Hidemaro Konoye (近衛 秀麿, Konoe Hidemaro; 18 November 1898 – 2 June 1973) was a Japanese conductor and composer of classical music. He was the younger brother of wartime Japanese Prime Minister Fumimaro Konoe.

== Biography ==
Konoye was born in Kōjimachi, Tokyo. He was the younger son of Duke Konoe Atsumaro, scion of one of the Five Regent Houses of the Fujiwara clan. The Konoe clan traditionally provided gagaku musicians to the Imperial Household. Despite this, Konoye pursued music over the objections of his family, who wished for him a career in politics. His decision was supported by his older brother, Fumimaro.

Konoye attended the Gakushuin Peers School, where he became close friends with Takashi Inukai. Around this time, Konoye frequently visited the Tokyo Music School and was privately educated by Kosaku Yamada. After graduating from Gakushuin, he matriculated at Tokyo Imperial University to study literature, but lost interest and eventually withdrew. At the age of 25, he decided to go to Europe to study music. He studied in Paris under Vincent d'Indy and Berlin under Franz Schreker.

He also studied conducting under Erich Kleiber, and Karl Muck. In 1924, he conducted at the Berlin Philharmonic. After spending a year a half, he returned to Japan in September 1924, bringing orchestra scores and other music materials he bought in Europe carried by three ships.

Konoye co-founded the Japan Symphonic Association in 1925, and the following year became conductor of the orchestra. Konoe later founded the New Symphony Orchestra of Tokyo (the present day NHK Symphony Orchestra), and helped mold the orchestra over a 10-year period into an ensemble that was praised as competitive with many of the better orchestras in Europe.

Today he is remembered for making the première recording of Mahler's Fourth Symphony, done in May 1930. It was also, aside from a cut in the third movement, the first electrical recording of any complete Mahler symphony.

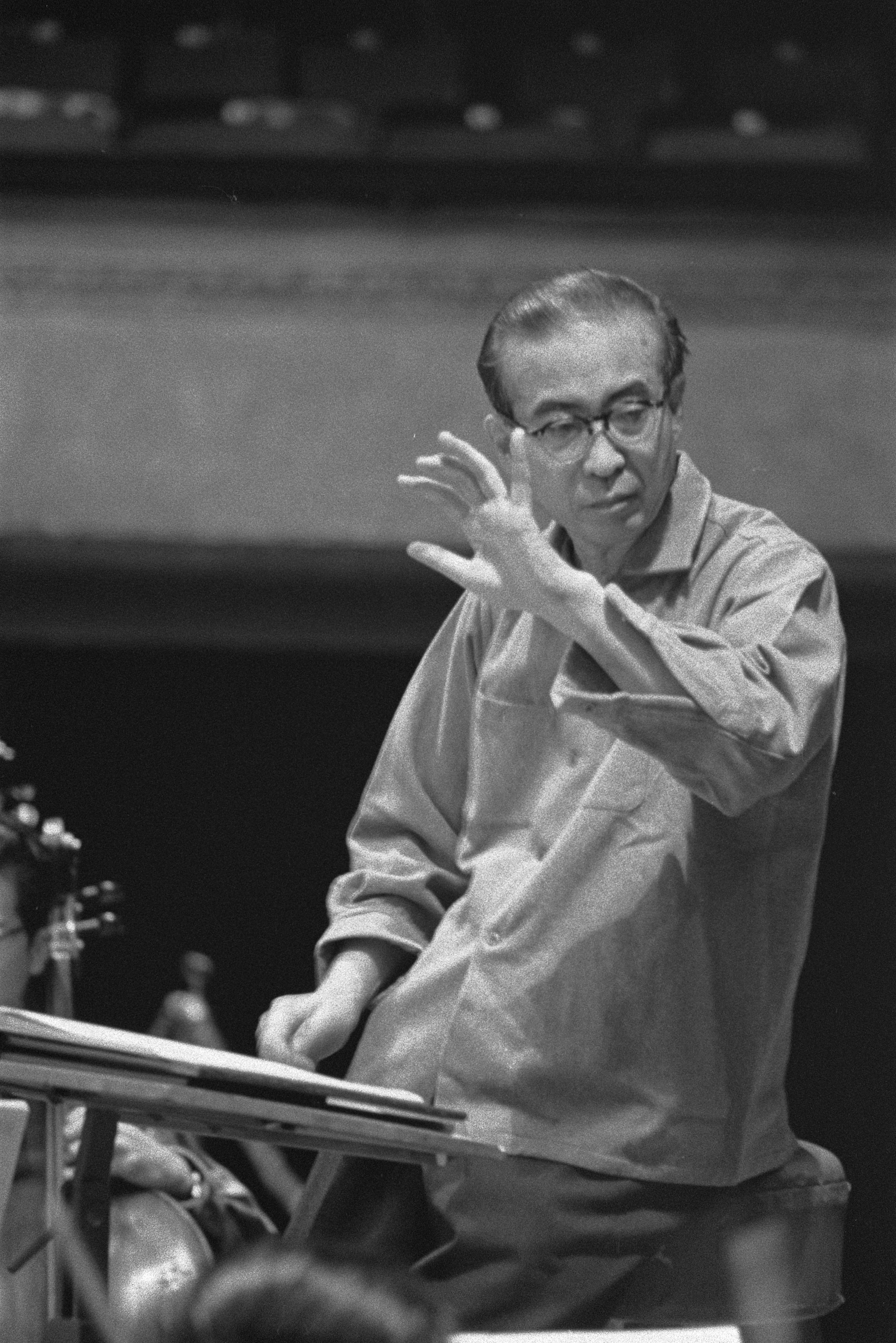
Hidemaro Konoye (1960)

Additionally, Konoye made numerous guest appearances in Europe and America, conducting some 90 different orchestras in the course of his career including the orchestra of La Scala, Milan and the NBC Symphony Orchestra. He created friendships with Erich Kleiber, Leopold Stokowski, Wilhelm Furtwängler and Richard Strauss. He went to Germany and conducted Berlin Philharmonic Orchestra in the second half of the 1930s. In the early days of the NBC Symphony, he planned an American tour under the supervision of Stokowski, but the project was cancelled due to World War II.

In 1964, he performed Mozart's Clarinet Concerto with Benny Goodman.

== Japanese premieres ==
Konoye conducted many notable Japanese premieres including:

- Richard Strauss: Serenade for Winds (1926)
- Paul Hindemith: Overture to Neues vom Tage (1927)
- Wolfgang Amadeus Mozart: Sinfonia Concertante for Four Winds (1927)
- Kurt Weill: Kleine Dreigroschenmusik (1929)
- Maurice Ravel: Ma mère l'Oye (1929)
- Richard Strauss: Oboe Concerto (with Otto Winter; 1962)
- Darius Milhaud: Oboe Concerto (with Heinz Holliger; 1970)

== Composer and arranger ==
Konoye wrote original compositions, but was more deeply interested in arranging existing music, including, for example, Modest Mussorgsky's Pictures at an Exhibition and Schubert's String Quintet, which he orchestrated.

== Major works ==
- Kronungs-Kantate for soprano, mezzo-soprano, baritone, chorus and orchestra (1928)
- Etenraku for orchestra (1931; arrangement of the gagaku piece of the same title)
- Kimigayo (national anthem of Japan) for orchestra
- Chin Chin Chidori for voice and piano

== Notable recordings ==
- Mahler: Symphony No. 4 (Sakaye Kitasaya (soprano), New Symphony Orchestra of Tokyo; recorded by Japanese Parlophone in May 1930)

== Ancestry ==
Ancestors of Hidemaro Konoye

16. Konoe Tsunehiro
8. Konoe Motosaki
17. Princess Arisugawa Tadako
4. Konoe Tadahiro
18. Matsudaira Yoshimasa
9. Kotohime
2. Konoe Atsumaro
1. Hidemaro Konoye
24. Maeda Narinaga
12. Maeda Nariyasu
6. Maeda Yoshiyasu
26. Tokugawa Ienari
13. Tokugawa Tomoko
27. Senkōin
3. Maeda Sadako

Preceded by none	Permanent Conductors, NHK Symphony Orchestra; 1926–1936	Succeeded by Joseph Rosenstock
