= Heinrich Thoma =

German general (1891–1948)

- Born: 26 April 1891; Nuremberg
- Died: 30 October 1948 (aged 57); Shuya, Soviet Union
- Military career
- Allegiance: German Empire; Weimar Republic; Nazi Germany
- Branch: Army
- Service years: 1910–1945
- Rank: Generalleutnant
- Unit: 296th Infantry Division
- Commands: 519th Infantry Regiment
- Conflicts: World War I World War II
- Awards: Knight's Cross of the Iron Cross

Heinrich Thoma (26 April 1891 – 30 October 1948) was a German general during World War II. In October 1941 while a regimental commander in the 296th Infantry Division during Operation Barbarossa, the Axis invasion of the Soviet Union, he was a recipient of the Knight's Cross of the Iron Cross, the highest award in the military and paramilitary forces of Nazi Germany during World War II. From June 1942 until the end of the war he commanded rear area and replacement divisions, and was deputy commander of a military district. As a prisoner of war he died in the Soviet Union in 1948.

== Biography ==
Heinrich Thoma was born on 26 April 1891 in Nuremberg in the Kingdom of Bavaria within the German Empire. In 1910, he joined the military service of the German Army as a Fahnenjunker (cadet). On 28 October 1912, he was commissioned as a Leutnant (second lieutenant) with the Königlich Bayerisches 16. Reserve-Infanterie-Regiment, a regiment of the 6th Bavarian Reserve Division. Later during World War I, Adolf Hitler served as a dispatch runner in this regiment. Following World War I, Thoma served in the Reichswehr of the Weimar Republic. He was promoted to Oberstleutnant (lieutenant colonel) on 1 January 1935 and to Oberst (colonel) on 1 August 1937. On 24 November 1938, Thoma took command of the 85th Infantry Regiment, a regiment of the 10th Infantry Division.

=== World War II ===
World War II in Europe began on Friday 1 September 1939 when German forces invaded Poland. During this invasion, Thoma commanded the 85th Infantry Regiment in its advance towards the Vistula, reported that thousands of Polish soldiers were captured.

During Operation Barbarossa, the German invasion of the Soviet Union, Thoma served as officer in the 296th Infantry Division and commanded the 519th Infantry Regiment. On 1 September 1941, he was promoted to Generalmajor, a rank equivalent to brigadier general. Although he regarded the population of the areas occupied by the advancing Wehrmacht as relatively primitive, Thoma expressed sympathy for Ukrainians and Volga Germans that his unit encountered, noting their poverty. As an ardent antisemite, he blamed Jews for the local conditions, and argued in his journal that the all Jews should be exterminated. He also considered the execution of Soviet partisans as just.

Thoma briefly commanded the 413th Landesschützen Division from 1 June 1942 until it was disbanded on 10 June, before taking command of the 432nd Replacement Division on 3 August 1942. Thoma's command was responsible for raising replacement units in Silesia. Thoma was promoted to Generalleutnant on 1 September 1943 and except for a short period in September and October 1943, he commanded the division until the end of the war. In 1944, Thoma's division was given responsibility for both replacement and training units, and this continued until early 1945. In the spring of that year the division was incorporated into the field army. At the end of the war, he was also the deputy commander of Wehrkreis VIII, the military district of Breslau (Silesia, the Sudetenland districts of Bohemia and Moravia, and southwest Poland). He was held as prisoner of war in NKVD special camp No. 48 in the Soviet Union, died on 30 October 1948 in a hospital at Shuya near Ivanovo, and buried in the camp cemetery.

== Awards and decorations ==
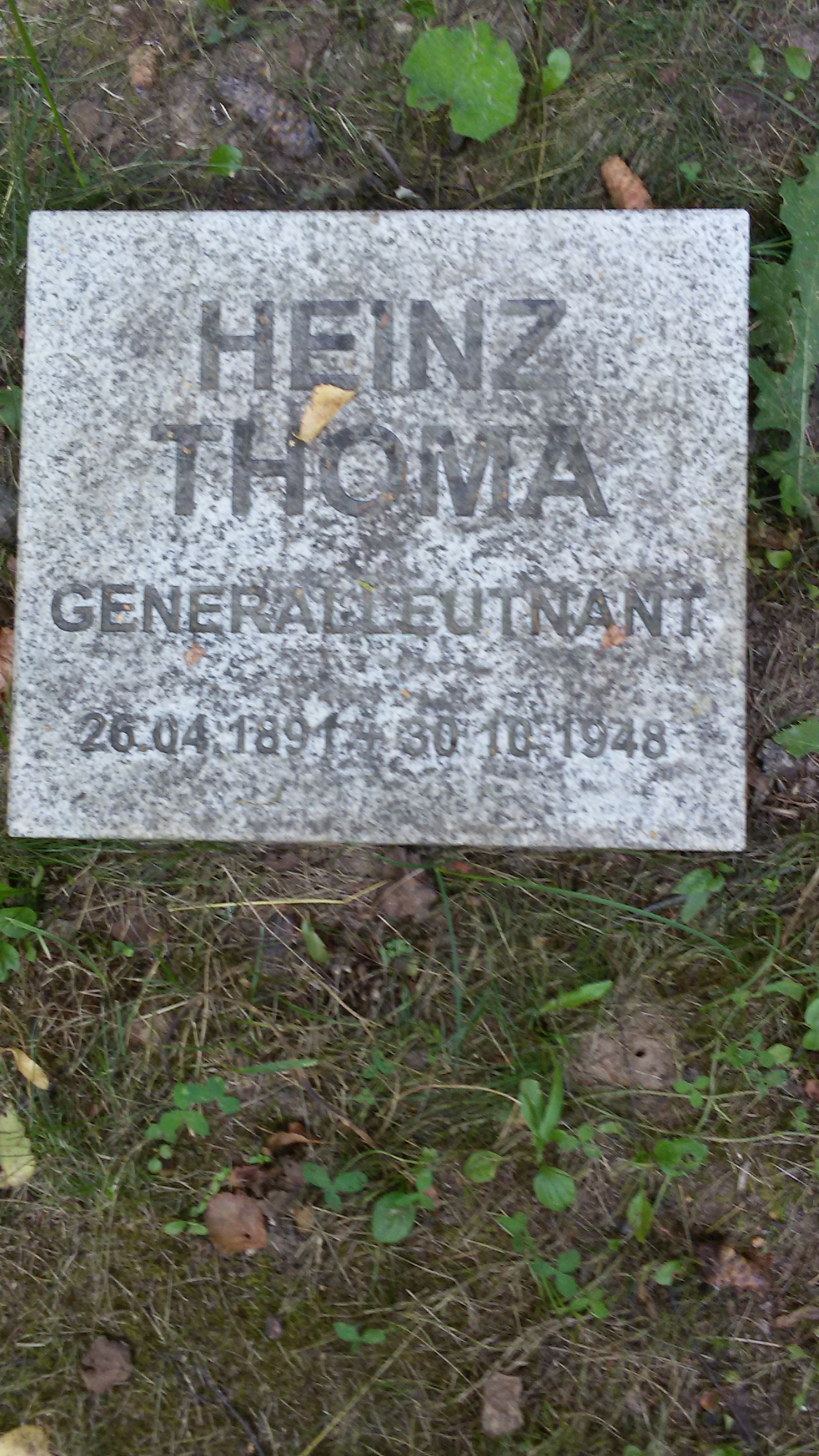
Grave in Cherntsy

- Knight's Cross of the Iron Cross on 27 October 1941 as Generalmajor and commander of the 519th Infantry Regiment.
- Honour Roll Clasp of the Army (15 March 1945)
