= List of kuge families =

The kuge families included the high level bureaucrats and nobles in the Imperial Court of Japan. This list is based on the lineage of the family (the clan from which the family derives, such as the Minamoto, Fujiwara, or Taira) and the kakaku (家格, rank). The kuge along with the daimyō were included to the kazoku peerage of post-Meiji Restoration Japan. The kazoku was abolished shortly after World War II.

The kakaku consists of six ranks, from highest to lowest, they are Sekke (摂家), Seigake (清華家), Daijinke (大臣家), Urinke (羽林家), Meike (名家), and Hanke (半家).

== Minamoto clan (Genji) ==
=== Seigake ===
- Hirohata 廣幡家
- Koga 久我家

=== Daijinke ===
- Nakanoin 中院家

=== Urinke ===
- Ayanokōji 綾小路家
- Chigusa 千種家
- Higashikuze 東久世家
- Iwakura 岩倉家
- Kuze 久世家
- Niwata 庭田家
- Ōhara 大原家
- Otagi 愛宕家
- Rokujō 六條家
- Uematsu 植松家
- Umedani 梅溪家

=== Hanke ===
- Itsutsuji 五辻家
- Jikōji 慈光寺家
- Takenouchi 竹内家

== Fujiwara clan ==
Originally, the Fujiwara four families (藤原四家) were branches established by the four sons of Fujiwara no Fuhito: Nanke, Hokke, Shikike, and Kyōke. Hokke later became the most successful out of the four families, and there are five main branches from Hokke, known as the Sekke, otherwise known as Five regent houses:

- Ichijō
- Konoe
- Kujō
- Nijō
- Takatsukasa

And other cadet branches of Fujiwara, becoming one of Kuge, include:

=== Seigake ===
- Daigo 醍醐家
- Imadegawa (renamed Kikutei) 今出川（菊亭）家
- Kasannoin 花山院家
- Ōinomikado 大炊御門家
- Saionji 西園寺家
- Sanjō 三條家
- Tokudaiji 德大寺家

=== Daijinke ===
- Sanjōnishi 三條西家
- Ōgimachinosanjō (renamed Saga) 正親町三條（嵯峨）家
- Nakanoin 中院家

=== Urinke ===
- Aburanokōji 油小路家
- Anegakōji 姉小路家
- Ano 阿野家
- Asukai 飛鳥井家
- Fujitani 藤谷家
- Hachijō 八條家
- Hanazono 花園家
- Hashimoto 橋本家
- Higashizono 東園家
- Higuchi 樋口家
- Hinonishi 日野西家
- Horikawa 堀河家
- Imaki 今城家
- Irie 入江家
- Ishiyama 石山家
- Iwano 石野家
- Jimyōin 持明院家
- Kawabata 河鰭家
- Kazahaya 風早家
- Kushige 櫛笥家
- Machijiri 町尻家
- Matsunaga 松永家
- Matsunoki 松木家
- Mibu 壬生家
- Minase 水無瀬家
- Mushanokōji 武者小路家
- Nakayama 中山家
- Nakazono 中園家
- Nanba 難波家
- Nishiōji 西大路家
- Nishiyotsutsuji 西四辻家
- Nonomiya 野宮家
- Ōgimachi 正親町家
- Ogura 小倉家
- Omiya 大宮家
- Oshikōji 押小路家
- Reizei (Reizen, Kaminoreizei) 冷泉家
- Rokkaku 六角家
- Sakurai 櫻井家
- Shichijō family 七條家
- Shigenoi 滋野井家
- Shijō 四條家
- Shimizudani 清水谷家
- Shimonoreizei 下冷泉家
- Sono 園家
- Sonoike 園池家
- Takamatsu 高松家
- Takano 高野家
- Takaoka 高丘家
- Umezono 梅園家
- Uratsuji 裏辻家
- Washio 鷲尾家
- Yabu 藪家
- Yamamoto 山本家
- Yamanoi 山井家
- Yamashina 山科家
- Yotsutsuji 四辻家

=== Meika ===
- Bōjō family 坊城家
- Hamuro 葉室家
- Hino 日野家
- Hinonishi 日野西家
- Hirohashi 廣橋家
- Honami 穂波家
- Ikegami 池尻家
- Kadenokōji 勘解由小路家
- Kajūji 勧修寺家
- Kanroji 甘露寺家
- Karasumaru 烏丸家
- Kitanokōji 北小路家
- Madenokōji 万里小路家
- Mimurodo 三室戸家
- Nakamikado 中御門家
- Okazaki 岡崎家
- Seikanji 清閑寺家
- Shibayama 芝山家
- Takeya 竹屋家
- Toyama 外山家
- Toyooka 豊岡家
- Tsutsumi 堤家
- Umenokōji 梅小路家
- Uramatsu 裏松家
- Yanagiwara 柳原家

=== Hanke ===
- Karahashi 唐橋家
- Shirakawa 白川家
- Takakura 高倉家
- Tominokōji 富小路家
- Nishikikōji 錦小路家

== Taira clan (Heishi) ==
=== Meika ===
- Hiramatsu 平松家
- Katano 交野家
- Nagatani 長谷家

=== Hanke ===
- Iwai 石井家
- Nishinotōin 西洞院家

== Others ==
=== Hanke ===
- Fujii 藤井家 (from Urabe clan)
- Fujinami 藤波家 (from Ōnakatomi clan)
- Fushihara 伏原家 (from Kiyohara clan)
- Funahashi 船橋家 (from Kiyohara clan)
- Gojō 五條家 (from Sugawara clan)
- Hagiwara 萩原家 (from Urabe clan)
- Higashibōjō 東坊城家 (from Sugawara clan)
- Karahashi 唐橋家 (from Sugawara clan)
- Kitanokoji 北小路家 (from Oe clan)
- Kiyooka 清岡家 (from Sugawara clan)
- Kurahashi 倉橋家 (from Abe clan)
- Kuwabara 桑原家 (from Sugawara clan)
- Nishigori 錦織家 (from Urabe clan)
- Sawa 澤家 (from Kiyohara clan)
- Takatsuji 高辻家 (from Sugawara clan)
- Tsuchimikado 土御門家 (from Abe clan)
- Yoshida 吉田家 (from Urabe clan)
