= NKVD special camp No. 48 =

POW camp in the Soviet Union

The NKVD special camp No. 48 (also UMVD POW camp no. 48) was located in Cherntsy, Ivanovo Oblast. Russia. Initially it was established during World War II as a POW camp for most senior military commanders of the Axis powers. In German sources it is known as Kriegsgefangenenlager Woikowo, the latter location translated in English as Voikovo. Later it housed a secret Soviet biological weapons facility.

The location of the camp was a former Dedlov family manor, where the Soviets established a sanatorium for railroad workers named after Pyotr Voykov, known simply as Voykov sanatorium, hence the (corrupted) German name of the camp.

== Axis POWs ==
The first party of Axis POWs was delivered to the camp in June 1943, captured during the Battle of Stalingrad: 22 Germans, 6 Romanians, and 3 Italians, including Friedrich Paulus with his aide-de-camp Willi Adam. Initially Paulus and his generals were delivered to NKVD POW camp no. 27 (Красногорский особый оперативно-пересыльный лагерь No. 27 НКВД) in Krasnogorsk, Moscow Oblast and held there during February–April 1943, then transferred to Monastery of Saint Euthymius in Suzdal, where a POW camp was established. However allegedly NKVD was afraid that the Nazis will send paratroopers to release Paulus, hence a more secluded location was eventually selected.

On 15 February 1954, thirty German Generals gathered from various other prison camps in the area were taken to NKVD special camp No. 48 raising the number of German Generals in the camp to 186. By the end of 1955 Germany had negotiated the release of 15,000 German prisoners of war in the Soviet Union including those at Camp No. 48.

Many German generals who died in captivity were buried at the Cherntsy cemetery, see Media related to World War II memorial in Cherntsy at Wikimedia Commons.

== Biological weapons facility ==
After the war, since 1949 it housed a secret Soviet biological weapons facility staffed with Japanese POWs which were members of Japanese Unit 731 and Unit 100 which developed biological weapons.

== Notable inmates ==
- Friedrich Paulus
- Friedrich Altrichter
- Wilhelm Mohnke
- Hans Baur
- Hans Boeckh-Behrens
- Otozō Yamada
- Fumitaka Konoe, the eldest son and heir of Prime Minister Fumimaro Konoe and the 13th-generation descendant of Emperor Go-Yōzei
- Lieutenant General Takahashi Takaatsu, former Chief of Veterinary Service, accused during the Khabarovsk war crimes trials died in prison in 1951, buried at the Cherntsy cemetery
- Heinrich Thoma
- Otto Günsche, Hitler's aide-de-camp (before sentencing)
