= Yorishige =

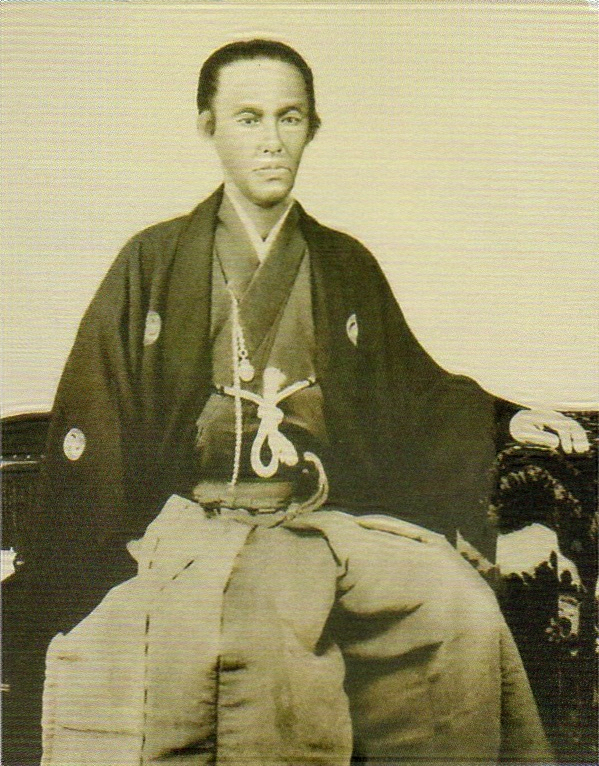
- Yorishige Arima (1828–1881), Japanese samurai of late Edo period
- Pronunciation: joɾiɕige (IPA)
- Gender: Male

Origin
- Origin: Japanese
- Meaning: Different meanings depending on the kanji used

Other names
- Alternative spelling: Yorisige (Kunrei-shiki) Yorisige (Nihon-shiki) Yorishige (Hepburn)

Yorishige is a masculine Japanese given name.

== Written forms ==
Yorishige can be written using different combinations of kanji characters. Here are some examples:

- 頼重, "rely, heavy"
- 頼茂, "rely, luxuriant"
- 頼繁, "rely, prosperous/complexity"
- 依重, "to depend on, heavy"
- 依茂, "to depend on, luxuriant"
- 依繁, "to depend on, prosperous/complexity"

The name can also be written in hiragana よりしげ or katakana ヨリシゲ.

== Notable people with the name ==
- Yorishige Arima (有馬 頼咸, 1828–1881), Japanese samurai of late Edo period
- Yorishige Matsudaira (松平 頼重) (1622–1695), Japanese daimyō
- Yorishige Suwa (諏訪 頼重) (1516–1542), Japanese samurai
