= Fumitaka =

Fumitaka is a Japanese masculine given name. Notable people with the name include:

- Fumitaka Konoe (近衛 文隆, 1915–1956), eldest son of Prime Minister Fumimaro Konoe
- Fumitaka Nitami (仁多見 史隆, born 1974), Japanese boxer
- Fumitaka Kitatani (北谷 史孝, born 1995), Japanese baseball player
