= Mototsugu =

- Gender: Male

Origin
- Origin: Japanese
- Meaning: Different meanings depending on the kanji used

Mototsugu (written: 基嗣 or 基次) is a masculine Japanese given name. Notable people with the name include:

- Gotō Mototsugu (後藤 基次; 1565–1615), Japanese samurai
- Konoe Mototsugu (近衛 基嗣; 1305–1354), Japanese kugyō
- Mototsugu Shimizu (清水 基嗣; born 1977), Japanese professional wrestler
