= Renji =

- Pronunciation: Re-n-ji
- Gender: Male
- Language: Japanese

Origin
- Origin: Japanese
- Meaning: a pure heart
- Region of origin: Japan

Other names
- Related names: Reiji

Renji (廉侍) is a masculine Japanese given name.

== Written forms ==
Renji can be written in Katakana as レンジ. In Kanji, it can be alternatively rendered as;

- 廉侍 "a pure heart, samurai."
- 蓮司 "lotus, preside over."
- 蓮治 "lotus, govern."
- 蓮慈 "lotus, be affectionate."
- 廉二 "a pure heart, two."
- 廉司 "a pure heart, preside over."
- 恋司 "love, preside over."
- 廉士 "a pure heart, samurai."
- 廉慈 "a pure heart, be affectionate."
- 廉次 "a pure heart, next."
- 廉治 "a pure heart, govern."
- 廉示 "a pure heart, shows."
- 怜仁 "clever, benevolence."
- 恋士 "love, samurai."
- 恋次 "love, next."
- 恋治 "love, govern."
- 漣二 "ripple, two."
- 漣司 "ripple, preside over."
- 漣璽 "ripple, emperor's seal."
- 練時 "practice, time."
- 蓮二 "lotus, two."
- 蓮侍 "lotus, samurai."
- 蓮史 "lotus, history."
- 蓮地 "lotus, ground."
- 蓮士 "lotus, samurai."
- 蓮弐 "lotus, two."
- 蓮志 "lotus, aspire."
- 蓮次 "lotus, next."
- 連路 "communicating, a road."

== People with the name ==
- Renji Ishibashi (石橋 蓮司, born Renji Ishida (石田 蓮司, Ishida Renji, born August 9, 1941) is a Japanese actor.
- Renji Matsui (松井 蓮之, born 27 February 2000), a Japanese soccer player.
- Renji Panicker (born 23 September 1960) is an Indian actor.

== Fictional characters ==
- Renji Abarai, a major character in the anime and manga series Bleach
- Renji Kamiyama, a supporting character in the Yakuza video game series
- Renji Yanagi, a supporting character in the anime and manga series The Prince of Tennis
- Renji Yomo, a supporting character in the anime and manga series Tokyo Ghoul

== Places ==
Renji may refer to:

- Renji Hospital of the Shanghai Jiao Tong University School of Medicine, Shanghai, China
- Yan Chai Hospital, Renji in pinyin, Hong Kong
- Gibb, Livingston & Co., known as Renji in Chinese
