= Hiramatsu =

Hiramatsu (written: 平松) is a Japanese surname. Notable people with the surname include:

- Akiko Hiramatsu (平松 晶子; born 1967), Japanese voice actress
- Daishi Hiramatsu (平松 大志; born 1983), Japanese footballer
- Junko Hiramatsu (平松 純子; born 1942), Japanese figure skater
- Kazuo Hiramatsu (平松 一夫; 1947–2020), Japanese academic administrator
- Kohei Hiramatsu (平松 康平; born 1985), Japanese footballer
- Kunio Hiramatsu (平松 邦夫; born 1948), Japanese politician
- Masaji Hiramatsu (平松 政次; born 1947), Japanese former professional baseball pitcher
- Morihiko Hiramatsu (平松 守彦; born 1924), Japanese politician
- Reiji Hiramatsu (平松 礼二; born 1941), Japanese Nihonga painter
- Sho Hiramatsu (平松 昇; born 1998), Japanese footballer
- Shinji Hiramatsu (平松 伸二; born 1955), Japanese manga artist
- Shu Hiramatsu (平松 宗; born 1992), Japanese footballer
- Yasuki Hiramatsu (平松 保城; 1926–2012), Japanese artist
- Yuji Hiramatsu (平松 祐司; born 1997), Japanese high jumper

== See also ==
- Hiramatsu Station, a railway station in Himeji, Hyōgo Prefecture, Japan
