= Tadataka =

- Gender: Male

Origin
- Origin: Japanese
- Meaning: Different meanings depending on the kanji used

Tadataka (written: 隆忠, 忠敬, 忠教 or 忠崇) is a masculine Japanese given name. Notable people with the name include:

- Fujiwara no Tadataka (藤原 隆忠; 1163–1245), Japanese kugyō
- Hayashi Tadataka (林 忠崇; 1848–1941), Japanese daimyō
- Inō Tadataka (伊能 忠敬; 1745–1818), Japanese cartographer
- Ōkubo Tadataka (大久保 忠教; 1560–1639), Japanese samurai
