= Reiji =

- Pronunciation: Rējí
- Gender: Male

Origin
- Origin: Japanese
- Meaning: It can have many different meanings depending on the kanji used.
- Region of origin: Japanese

Other names
- Related names: Rei; Reiichi

Reiji (れいじ, レイジ) is a common masculine Japanese given name.

== Written forms ==
Reiji can be written using different kanji characters and can mean:

- 礼二, "salute, two"
- 礼司, "salute, rule"
- 礼治, "salute, govern"
- 玲次, "sound of jewels, next"
- 怜児, "wise, child"
- 麗司, "lovely, rule"
- 零児, "zero, child"
- 零司, "zero, rule"
- 零時, "zero, time" (midnight)
- 伶史, "actor, history"
- 令治, "orders, govern"
- 澪士, "waterway, scholar"

The name can also be written in hiragana or katakana.

== People with the name ==
- Reiji Esaki (江崎 礼二; 1845–1910), Japanese photographer
- Reiji Hiraki (平木 玲次; born 1998), Japanese racing driver
- Reiji Hiramatsu (平松 礼二; born 1941), Japanese Nihonga painter
- Reiji Hirata (平田 礼次; born 1975), Japanese football manager
- Reiji Kawashima (川島 零士; born 1995), Japanese voice actor
- Reiji Kozawa (小澤 怜史; born 1998), Japanese professional baseball pitcher
- Leiji Matsumoto (松本 零士; 1938–2023), Japanese manga artist
- Reiji Miyajima (宮島 礼吏; born 1985), Japanese manga artist
- Reiji Nagakawa (永川 玲二; 1928–2000), Japanese translator
- Reiji Okazaki (岡崎 令治; 1930–1975), Japanese molecular biologist
- Reiji Oyama (pastor) (尾山 令仁; 1927–2023), Japanese pastor, founder and chancellor
- Reiji Sato (佐藤 令治; born 1993), Japanese footballer
- Reiji Suzuki (鈴木 礼治; 1928–2022), Japanese politician
- Reiji Yamada (山田 玲司; born 1966), Japanese manga artist

== Fictional characters ==
- Azuma Reiji, a character from Phantom ~Requiem for the Phantom~
- Takigawa Reiji (レイジ), a character from the fighting game series Bloody Roar
- Reiji (also known as "Rage"), a character in the manga Gravitation
- Reiji Arisu (零児), the original character in the action RPG/tactical RPG hybrid Namco × Capcom
- Reiji Akaba, called Declan Akaba in the English dub, the rival character in the anime and manga series Yu-Gi-Oh! Arc-V
- Reiji Fujita (玲司), the main character in the manga and anime series Gallery Fake
- Reiji Kageyama, antagonist of sci-fi/action manga and anime series Gate Keepers
- Reiji Kokonoe of Kodomo no Jikan
- Reiji Mitsurugi (怜侍), a character from the Japanese version of the Ace Attorney video game
- Reiji Mizuchi is from an anime called Beyblade: Metal Fusion series
- Reiji Namikawa (零司), a minor character in the manga and anime series Death Note
- Reiji Nogi (怜治), a villain in the Japanese tokusatsu series Kamen Rider Kabuto
- Reiji Oozora (レイジ), a character in the manga and anime series Dragon Drive character
- Reiji Oyama (礼児), a character in the fighting game series Power Instinct
- Reiji Takayama (澪士), a character in the anime series based on the American comic book Witchblade
- Reiji Sakamaki (レイジ), a character in the visual novel and anime series Diabolik Lovers
- Reiji (レイジ), known as Reggie in the English dub, is a minor recurring character in the Diamond & Pearl Pokémon anime series and the older brother of Shinji (Paul).
- Reiji Suwa (怜治 ), a character from Prince of Stride.
- Reiji Kotobuki, a character from Uta no Prince-sama.
- Reiji Kido (城戸玲司 ), the Death arcana user from Megami Ibunroku Persona. he is renamed to Chris in the US English localization of Persona 1; Revelations: Persona.

== See also ==
- 6565 Reiji, a Main-belt Asteroid
