= Kanehiro =

- Gender: Male

Origin
- Origin: Japanese
- Meaning: Different meanings depending on the kanji used

Kanehiro (written: 兼熙 or 兼寛) is a masculine Japanese given name. Notable people with the name include:

- Takaki Kanehiro (高木 兼寛; 1849–1920), Japanese physician
- Takatsukasa Kanehiro (鷹司 兼熙; 1659–1725), Japanese kugyō
