= Matsudono Moroie =

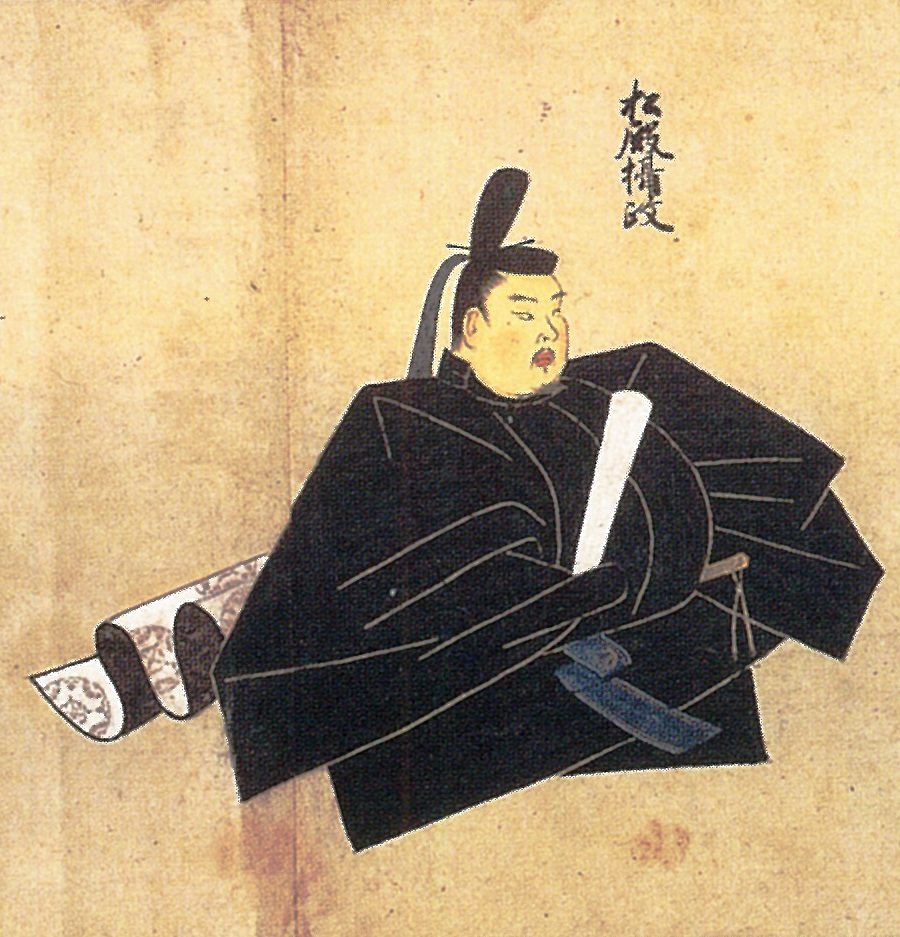
Portrait in the Tennō Sekkan Daijin Eizukan

Matsudono Moroie (松殿 師家; July 12, 1172 – November 11, 1238), third son of Matsudono Motofusa, was a kugyō (high-ranking Japanese official) from the late Heian period to the early Kamakura period. Regent Fujiwara no Tadataka and Buddhist monks Gyōi and Jitsuson are his stepbrothers. His mother was Tadako (忠子), a daughter of Kasan Tadamasa and one of his sisters was Ishi, mother of Dōgen; shortly after Minamoto no Michitomo, Dōgen's father, died, Moroie adopted his three year old nephew until Dōgen ran away to his uncle Ryōkan, a monk living at the foot of Mount Hiei.

Though he was not first-born, in 1179, the year his father became a monk, at age eight he was promoted to chūnagon, one of Daijō-kan due to the political tension between Emperor Go-Shirakawa and Taira no Kiyomori. However, this caused backlash from Kiyomori, leading to the Jisho coup in the same year.

When he was thirteen, Moroie was made naidaijin by Kiso Yoshinaka.

In 1232, he ordained as a Buddhist monk and took the Dharma name Daishin (大心).
