= Takatsukasa Kanehiro =

Takatsukasa Kanehiro (鷹司 兼熙; January 17, 1659 – December 24, 1725), son of Fusasuke, was a kugyō or Japanese court noble of the Edo period (1603–1868). He held a regent position kampaku from 1703 to 1707.

Fusahiro was his adopted son who he had with a daughter of the first head of the Takamatsu Domain Matsudaira Yorishige.

== Family ==
Parents

- Father: Takatsukasa Fusasuke (鷹司 房輔, June 22, 1637 – March 1, 1700)
- Mother: Lady Takeko no Oe (大江竹子, d. 1679), Hidenari Mori's daughter (毛利秀就)

Consorts and issues:

- Wife: Osahime (長姫), third daughter of Matsudaira Yorishige (松平頼重)
- Concubine: Unknown
  - Takatsukasa Mokoto (鷹司基子, 1710-1730), consort of Kyōgoku-no-miya Yakahito shinnō (京極宮 家仁親王), first daughter
- Adopted children
  - Takatsukasa Fusahiro (鷹司 房熙, 6 September 1710 – 9 June 1730) – biological son of Konoe Iehiro (近衛 家熈)
  - Saionji Kin'aki (西園寺 公晃, 4 August 1702 – 9 October 1770)- biological son of Saionji Munesue (西園寺致季)
