= Takatsukasa Norihira =

Takatsukasa Norihira (鷹司 教平; 14 February 1609 – 7 November 1668), son of Nobuhisa, was a kugyo or Japanese court noble of the early Edo period (1603–1868). He did not hold regent positions kampaku and sessho. The regent Takatsukasa Fusasuke was his son. His other son Kujō Kaneharu was adopted by the Kujō family. His daughter Takatsukasa Nobuko married the fifth shōgun Tokugawa Tsunayoshi.

== Family ==
Parents

- Father: Takatsukasa Nobuhisa (鷹司 信尚, 17 May 1590 – 31 December 1621)
- Mother: Imperial Princess Seishi (清子内親王; 1593–1674), daughter of Emperor Go-Yozei

Consorts and issues:

- Wife: Princess Bunchi (文智女王) (1619-1697), daughter of Emperor Go-Mizunoo
- Concubine: Tamemitsu Reizei's daughter (冷泉為満)
  - Takatsukasa Fusasuke (鷹司 房輔, June 22, 1637 – March 1, 1700), 1st son
  - Kujō Kaneharu (九条 兼晴, 1641 – 1677), 3rd son
  - Takatsukasa Nobuko (鷹司信子, 1651–1709), 1st daughter
    - Married Tokugawa Tsunayoshi
  - Takatsukasa Fusako (鷹司房子, 12 October 1653 – 19 May 1712), 2nd daughter
    - Married Emperor Reigen and had issue (a daughter)
- Concubine: Unknown name
  - Toshimi (俊海), 2nd son
