= Konoe Motomichi =

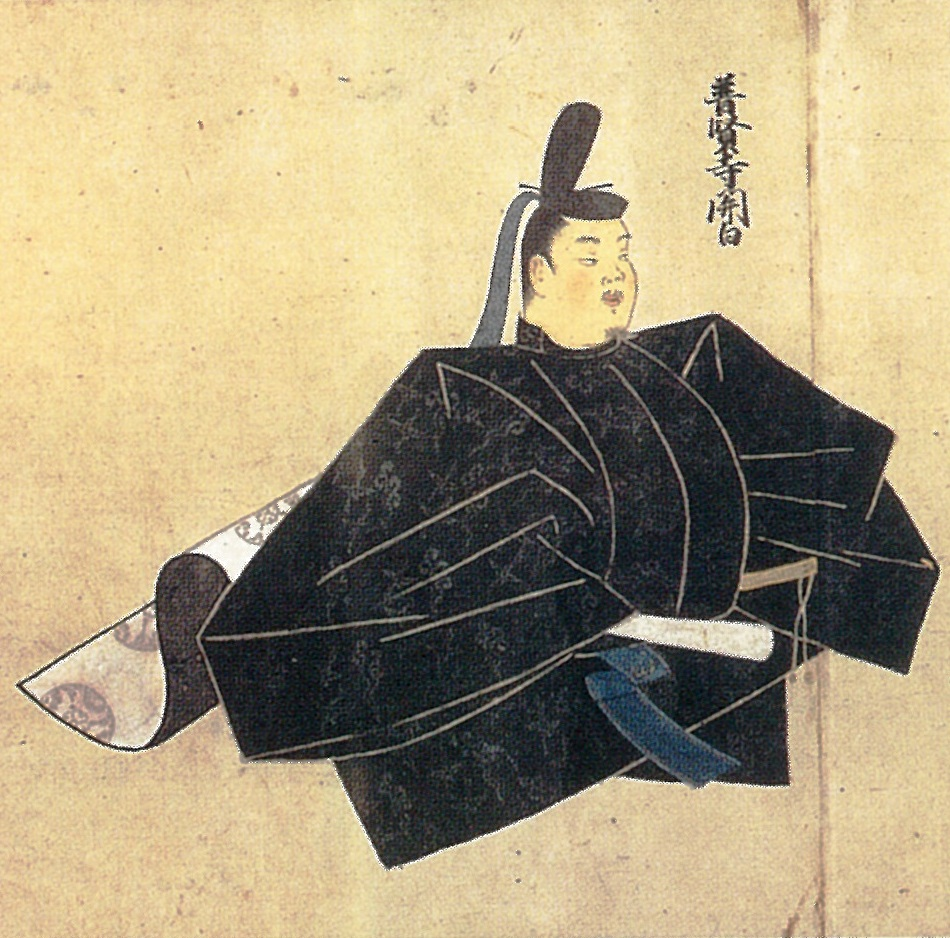
Konoe Motomichi

Konoe Motomichi (近衛 基通; 1160 – July 8, 1233) was a Kugyō (high-ranking Japanese official) from the late Heian period to the early Kamakura period. His father was Motozane, the founder of Konoe family, and his mother was a daughter of Tadataka. Among his sons is Iezane. His wife was Taira no Sadako, the sixth daughter of Kiyomori.

In 1179, Motomichi was promoted to kampaku, regent, as a result of the coup led by Kiyomori, the father of his stepmother who also his father-in-law. In February of the following year he took the position of sesshō, regent-ship for Emperor Antoku.

In 1208, he ordained as a Buddhist monk and took the Dharma name Gyōri (行理).

Parents

- Father: Konoe Motozane
- Mother: Fujiwara no Tadataka
- Wife: Taira no Sadako, daughter of Taira no Kiyomori (平完子)
- Concubine: Daughter of Minamoto no Akinobu
  - Konoe Iezane (近衞家実; 1179-1242), first son
- Concubine: Taira no Nobuko (平信子 )
  - Konoe Michitsune (近衞道經; 1184-1238), second son
- Concubine: Daughter of a monk
  - Takatsukasa Kanemoto (鷹司兼基), third son
  - Motonori Fujiwara (藤原基教; 1196-1213), fourth son
- Unknown Concubine
  - Enchu (円忠; 1180-1234)
  - Enjō (円浄; 1189-1256)
  - Enki (円基)
  - Shizuchu (静忠; 1190-1263)
  - Nisumi (仁澄)
  - Minobu (実信)
  - Mitoko (尊任)
