= Takatsukasa Fusahiro =

Japanese court noble

Takatsukasa Fusahiro (鷹司 房熙; September 6, 1710 – June 9, 1730), son of Konoe Iehiro and adopted son of Takatsukasa Kanehiro, was a kugyō or Japanese court noble of the Edo period (1603–1868). He did not hold regent positions sesshō and kampaku. He and his wife did not have a son, but they adopted one Hisasuke.

== Family ==
Parents

- Adopted Father: Takatsukasa Kanehiro (鷹司 兼熙, January 17, 1659 – December 24, 1725)
- Father: Konoe Iehiro (近衛 家熈, July 24, 1667 – November 5, 1736)
- Mother: Machiriji Ryōshi (町尻量子), daughter of Machiriji Kenryō (町尻兼量)

Consorts and issues:

- Wife: Unknown
- Adopted children
  - Takatsukasa Hisasuke (鷹司 尚輔, 1726 – April 19, 1733), son of Konoe Iehiro
  - Takatsukasa Mototeru (鷹司 基輝, April 19, 1727 – July 6, 1743), son of Ichijō Kaneka
