= Tokugawa Munetaka =

Japanese daimyō (1705–1730)

Lord of Mito
- In office 1718–1730
- Preceded by: Tokugawa Tsunaeda
- Succeeded by: Tokugawa Munemoto

Personal details
- Born: 29 August 1705
- Died: 23 May 1730 (aged 24)

Tokugawa Munetaka (徳川 宗堯; 29 August 1705 – 23 May 1730) was a Japanese daimyō of the mid-Edo period, who ruled the Mito Domain. He was the son of Matsudaira Yoritoyo, the lord of the Takamatsu Domain. His childhood name was Matsudaira Kemaro (松平軽麻呂) later changed to Tokugawa Tsuruchiyo (徳川鶴千代).

== Family ==
- Father: Matsudaira Yoritoyo (1680-1735)
- Mother: Yuasa-dono
- Wife: Miyohime (1708-1746) daughter of Tokugawa Yoshizane
- Concubine: Okajima-dono
- Children:
  - Matsudaira Yoriyuki (1727-1774) by Okajima
  - Tokugawa Munemoto by Miyohime

== Ancestry ==
Ancestors of Tokugawa Munetaka

16. Tokugawa Yorifusa, 1st Lord of Mito (1603-1661)
8. Matsudaira Yorishige, 1st Lord of Takamatsu (1622-1695)
17. Kyūshōin (1604-1662)
4. Matsudaira Yoritoshi (1661-1687)
9. Kabashima Matsuno
2. Matsudaira Yoritoyo, 3rd Lord of Takamatsu (1680-1735)
20. Higuchi Nobutaka (1600-1658)
10. Higuchi Nobuyasu (1623-1691)
21. Hirohashi
5. Higuchi Nanahime
1. Tokugawa Munetaka, 4th Lord of Mito
3. Yuasa Satoryō-in

Preceded by Tokugawa Tsunaeda	4th (Tokugawa) lord of Mito; 1718–1730	Succeeded by Tokugawa Munemoto
