= Takatsukasa Mototeru =

Japanese court noble

Takatsukasa Mototeru (鷹司 基輝; April 19, 1727 – July 6, 1743), son of Ichijō Kaneka and adopted son of Takatsukasa Fusahiro , was a Kugyō or Japanese court noble of the Edo period (1603–1868). Sukehira was his adopted son.

== Family ==
Parents

- Biological Father: Takatsukasa Fusahiro (鷹司 房熙, September 6, 1710 – June 9, 1730),
- Father: Ichijō Kaneka (一条 兼香, January 12, 1692 – September 21, 1751)
- Mother: Court lady
- Adopted son
  - Takatsukasa Sukehira (鷹司 輔平, March 17, 1738 – February 8, 1813
