= Konoe Motozane =

Konoe Motozane 近衛 基実
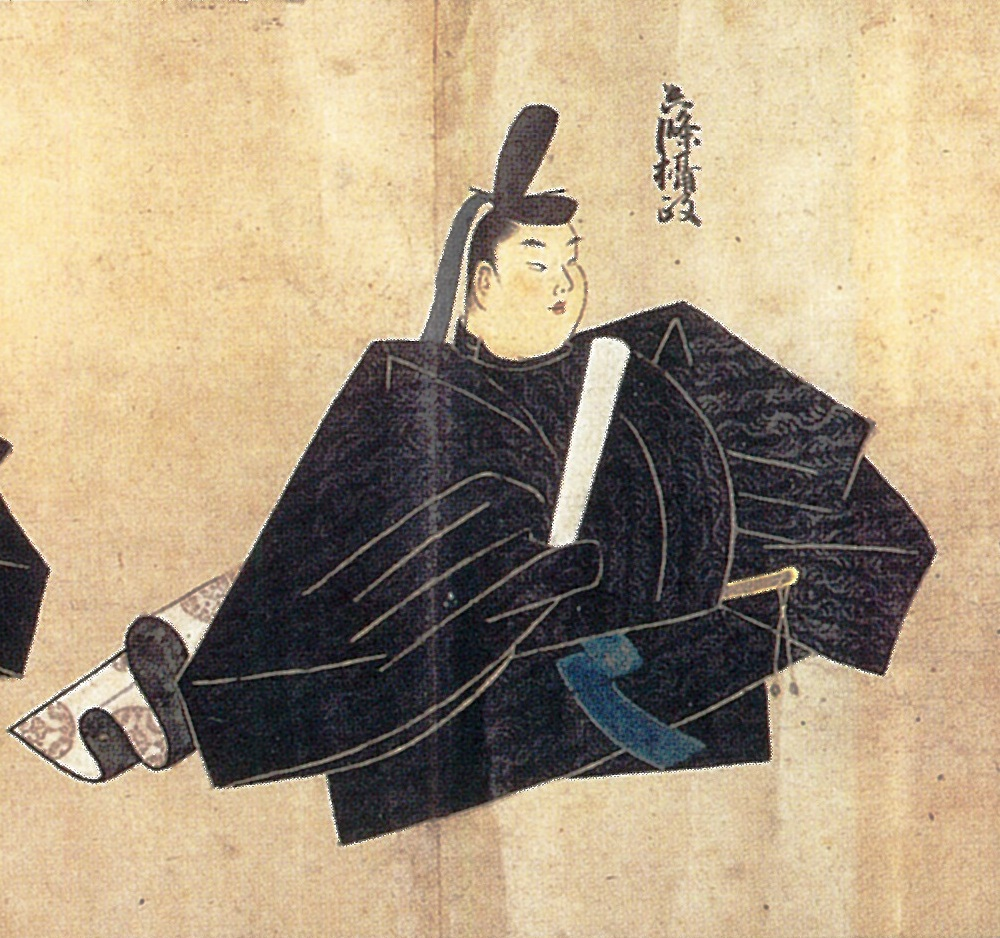
- Born: 1143
- Died: August 23, 1166 (aged 22–23)
- Occupation: Kugyō

Konoe Motozane (近衛 基実; 1143 – August 23, 1166) was a Japanese statesman, regent and kugyō during the late Heian period. He is the founder of the Konoe family and the father of Konoe Motomichi.

== Life and career ==
Motozane was born in 1143, to his father Fujiwara no Tadamichi.

Motozane married the daughter of Fujiwara no Tadataka, whom he later divorced, and remarried to Taira no Moriko, the fourth daughter of Taira no Kiyomori. At the age of 16 he assumed the position of kampaku, regent, to Emperor Nijō, becoming the head of the Fujiwara clan. He died at the age of 24, a year after he became sesshō, or regent, to Emperor Rokujō, leaving his wife Taira no Moriko windowed at the age of 12.

His descendants later came to be known as the Konoe family, one of the Five sessho families, taking its name from Motozane's Kyoto residence on Konoe-Ōji (近衛大道) road.

== Family ==
- Father: Fujiwara no Tadamichi
- Mother: Minamoto no Kunizane's daughter
- Legal wife (正室): Taira no Moriko, Taira no Kiyomori's daughter
- Wife: Fujiwara no Tadataka's daughter
  - Eldest son: Konoe Motomichi (1160-1233)
- Wife: Fujiwara no Akisuke's daughter
  - Second son: Awataguchi Tadayoshi (1164-1225)
  - Daughter: Konoe Michiko (b.1163) married Emperor Takakura
- Wife: Minamoto no Moritsune's daughter
  - ??? (覚尊)
- unknown
  - ??? (祐覚)
  - ??? (道鑑)
