= Takatsukasa Sukehira =

Japanese court noble

Takatsukasa Sukehira (鷹司 輔平; March 17, 1739 – February 8, 1813) was a Japanese court noble of the Edo period (1603–1868). He held the regent position of kampaku from 1787-1791.

== Biography ==
Sukehira was the adopted son of Takatsukasa Mototeru. He was a grandson of Emperor Higashiyama and son of Naohito, Prince Kan'in, thus a paternal uncle of Emperor Kōkaku. Due to the frequent adoption between families of Fujiwara clan, Sukehira had modern agnatic descendants under the family names Tokudaiji, Kikutei (菊亭), Hanazono (華園), Kajino (梶野), Takachiho (高千穗), Nakanoin (中院), Sumitomo (住友), Muromachi (室町), Yamamoto (山本), Kitakawara (北河原), Senshū (千秋).

He served as kampaku from 1787-1791.

He had a son, Masahiro, with the daughter of the eighth head of Chōshū Domain Mori Shigetaka.

He died in 1813, aged 73.
