= Princess Onna-ni =

Japanese princess

Princess Onna-ni 女二宮
- Born: 14 October 1625
- Died: 2 July 1651 (aged 25)
- Spouse: Konoe Hisatsugu
- Issue: Yoshi-miko
- House: Imperial House of Japan
- Father: Emperor Go-Mizunoo
- Mother: Tokugawa Masako

Princess Onna-ni (Note: 女二宮; also rendered as Second Princess, Onna ninomiya, or Princess Ninomiya.) (女二宮; personal name unknown) was a Japanese princess and daughter of Emperor Go-Mizunoo and his wife Tokugawa Masako.

== Life ==
Ninomiya was born on 14 October 1625 to Emperor Go-Mizunoo and Tokugawa Masako and was their second daughter.

According to the terms set out by the shōgunate upon the abdication of Ninomiya's half-sister, Empress Meishō, the princess, along with her half-brother (the soon-to-be Emperor Go-Kōmyō) were upon the few people that the Empress would actually be allowed to visit upon her abdication.

The princess wed Konoe Hisatsugu and together they had a daughter, Yoshi-miko. Their daughter wed the head of the Fushimi-no-miya, Prince Fushimi-no-miya Sadayuki.

Furthermore, whilst not biologically related, Princess Ninomiya was considered the mother of Hisatsugu's son with a concubine, Konoe Motohiro.

She died in 1651 aged 25.

== Regarding her name ==
The princess's real name is unknown, with Onna Ninomiya being a title. Her name is sometimes written as Princess Akiko, however this is likely not her name, instead coming from her being mistakenly conflated for another daughter of Emperor Go-Mizunoo, Princess Akiko.
