= Fumitaka Konoe =

Japanese military officer

- 近衛 文隆
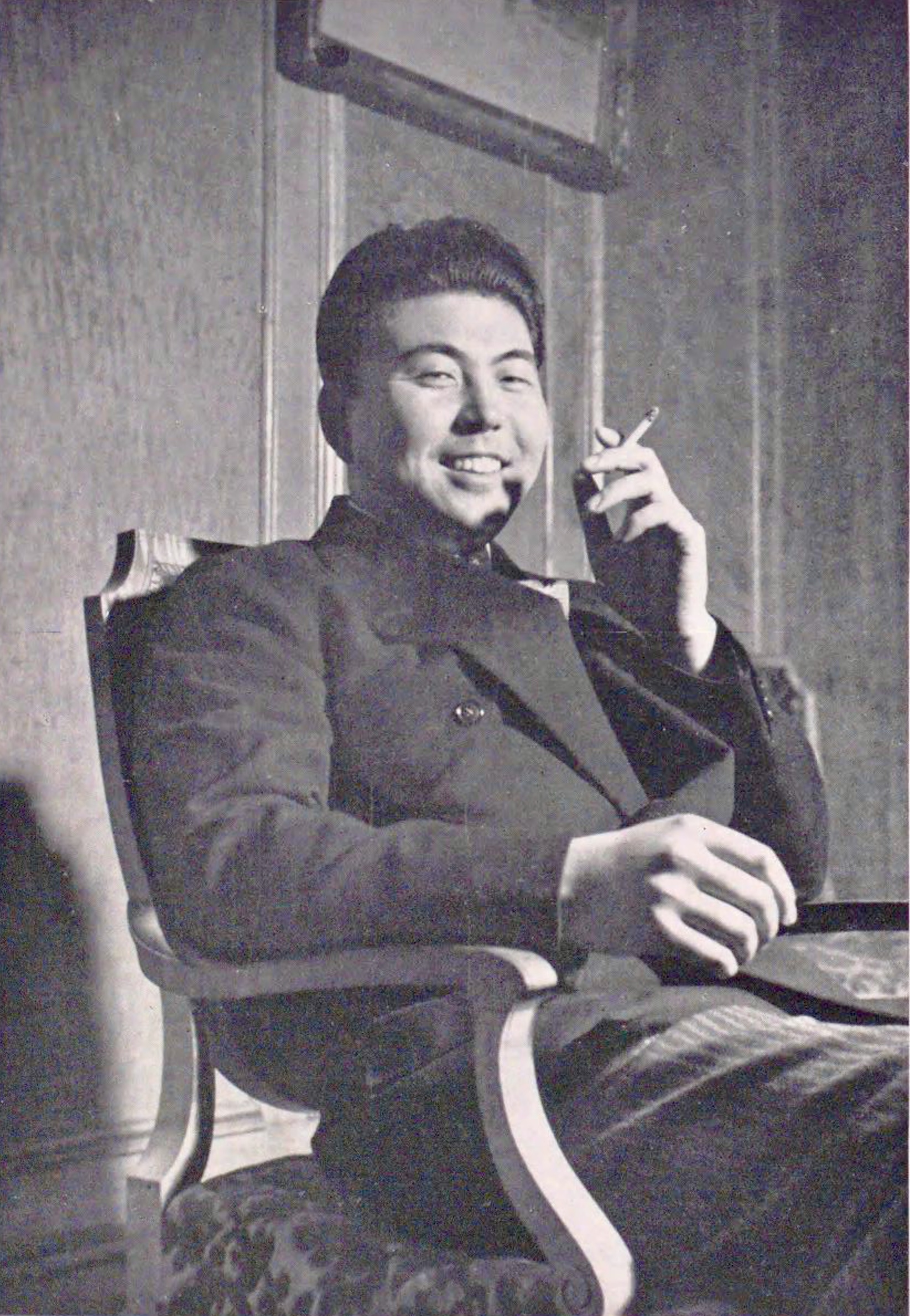
- Konoe in 1938
- Born: April 3, 1915; Kyoto, Japan
- Died: October 29, 1956 (aged 41); Ivanovo Oblast, Soviet Union
- Education: Gakushūin Junior High School; Lawrenceville School; Princeton University
- Military career
- Allegiance: Empire of Japan
- Branch: Imperial Japanese Army
- Service years: 1940–1945
- Rank: Lieutenant
- Unit: Manchukuo Artillery Regiment
- Conflicts: World War II
- Other work: Secretary to Prime Minister Fumimaro Konoe

Fumitaka Konoe (近衛 文隆, Konoe Fumitaka; April 3, 1915 – October 29, 1956) was the eldest son and heir of Prime Minister Fumimaro Konoe and the 13th-generation descendant of Emperor Go-Yōzei. He served as a lieutenant in the Imperial Japanese Army in World War II. At the end of the war, he was taken as a prisoner of war by the Soviet Union. He died in a Soviet prison camp in 1956.

== Biography ==
Fumitaka Konoe was born in Kyoto as the eldest son of Fumimaro Konoe and his wife Chiyoko, (from a branch of the Mōri clan). The Konoe family were members of the kazoku nobility and the line was part of the Fujiwara northern house, the leading go-sekke (five houses) lineage.

After graduating from Gakushūin Junior High School, Konoe was sent to the United States to study as a diplomat. He graduated from Lawrenceville School and studied at Princeton University. He actively participated as an amateur golfer during his stay in America and worked as the manager of a golf club. He returned to Japan in 1938 to become his father's secretary.

The following year, in 1939, he became a lecturer at Toa Dobunshoin University (Tung Wen College) in Shanghai concurrently becoming became a student director. With the diplomatic situation in China between the Kuomintang government and the Imperial Japanese Army becoming increasing strained, Konoe felt the need for direct negotiations with Chiang Kai-shek to avoid open warfare. He cultivated an association with the daughter of an important government official who guided him to Chongqing; this private diplomacy was discovered by the Kempeitai, and he was then recalled to Japan because this was seen by the cabinet as a problem. The woman he had made an acquaintance with was a Chinese spy - there is also a theory that he was ordered to return home for fear that he would leak confidential information to Zheng Pingru.

After his return to Japan, Konoe created a youth political organization called the Shonen Doshi-kai (青年同志会) to continue to insist on direct negotiations to prevent war in China. His actions were regarded as a problem by military authorities, in February 1940 he was drafted into the Imperial Japanese Army. Due to his education and background, he was selected as an officer candidate and was promoted to lieutenant. He was assigned to an artillery regiment in Manchukuo.

In the midst of the Pacific War, he was married in Harbin in 1944 to Empress Teimei's niece, Masako Otani. On August 19, 1945, four days after the official end of the war, he was arrested by a Soviet GRU SMERSH unit and taken as a prisoner to the Soviet Union. He was moved through 15 different detention camps in Siberia over the next ten years. During his detention, he refused to use his rank as an officer as a shield against labor, and abuse. In 1955, during Japanese-Soviet diplomatic normalization negotiations, Prime Minister Ichirō Hatoyama made a formal request for his release, and presented a petition signed by hundreds of thousands of people from Japan; however, the Soviet Union refused. In 1956 it was reported that he had died in NKVD special camp No. 48 Ivanovo Oblast, Lezhnevsky district, Cherntsy village. The cause of death is thought to be cerebral hemorrhage due to arteriosclerosis and acute nephritis, but there is also a theory he was poisoned by the Soviet secret services. His remains were returned to Japan in 1958 due to the efforts of his wife Masako.

On October 18, 1991, in accordance with Articles 2 and 3 of the Soviet Law on Restoring the Honor of Victims of Political Repression he was formally acquitted of wrongdoing, and on February 27, 1992, this ruling was reconfirmed by the Russian Federation's Military Police High Public Prosecutor, with a certificate to this effect issued on October 16, 1997, by the Russian Federation's Military Police High Public Prosecutor.

At the time of his death, he had no legitimate child. to continue the family line, his widow Masako adopted Fumitaka's nephew Moriteru Hosokawa, who took the name Tadateru Konoe and became head of the Konoe family.

== Model work (artistic portrayal) ==
- Theatrical company Shiki (four seasons) musical "The hill of a foreign country"
- Musical drama "Mato (Capital of Devils) Nocturne"
