= Rokudai Shōjiki =

Japanese history book of the early Kamakura period

Rokudai Shōjiki (六代勝事記) was a Japanese history book written in the early Kamakura period, narrating events in chronological order. The Rokudai, meaning six generations, refers to the six reigns of Emperors Takakura, Antoku, Go-Toba, Tsuchimikado, Juntoku, and Go-Horikawa. The Rokudai was written between the fifth month of 1223 and the end of 1224, beginning with the 1156 Hōgen rebellion and ends with a description of the punishments meted out to those involved in the Jōkyū War. Minamoto no Mitsuyuki was long considered to be the author; recently, historians have argued that Fujiwara no Tadataka, who was retired at the time the book was written, is a more likely candidate.

The book contends that Emperor Go-Toba lost the Jōkyū War because of his immorality, casting him as a villain, and that the event therefore does not necessarily challenge the authority of the emperor and his court. This viewpoint, which was convenient for both the imperial court and the newly formed Kamakura shogunate, had profound influence in later relations between the kuge aristocratic class and that of samurai.

== See also ==
- Masukagami, which also narrates events in Kamakura period.
