= Takatsukasa Nobuhisa =

Takatsukasa Nobuhisa (鷹司 信尚; 17 May 1590 – 31 December 1621), son of Nobufusa and Sassa Teruko, the daughter of Sassa Narimasa, was a kugyo or Japanese court noble of the early Edo period (1603–1868). He held a regent position kampaku from 1612 to 1615. Norihira was his son.

== Family ==
Parents

- Father: Takatsukasa Nobufusa (鷹司 信房, 17 November 1565 – 18 January 1658)
- Mother: Sassa Teruko (佐々輝子, d. 1630), daughter of Sassa Narimasa

Consorts and issue:

- Wife: Imperial Princess Seishi (清子内親王; 1593–1674), daughter of Emperor Go-Yōzei
  - Takatsukasa Norihira (鷹司 教平, 14 February 1609 – 7 November 1668), 1st son
  - Lady Taikō-in (大光院), 1st daughter
  - Lady Shunkō-in (春光院), 2nd daughter
