= 296th Infantry Division =

German WWII infantry division

- 296. Infanterie-Division
- Active: February 1940 - August 1944
- Country: Nazi Germany
- Branch: Army
- Type: Infantry
- Role: Division
- Engagements: World War II: Battle of Kiev; Operation Bagration

The 296th Infantry Division (German: 296. Infanterie-Division) was an infantry division of the German Heer during World War II.

== History ==
The 296th Infantry Division was formed on 5 February 1940 as a division of the eighth Aufstellungswelle in the Passau-Deggendorf area in Wehrkreis XIII. Its initial regiments were the Infantry Regiment 519, 520, 521, as well as Artillery Regiment 296 "Reichsgründung". The initial commander of the 296th Infantry Division was Wilhelm Stemmermann, appointed on 1 January 1941.

Between the summer of 1940 and the spring of 1941, the 296th Infantry Division was stationed in the Lille area.

Between June 1941 and July 1944, the 296th Infantry Division fought on the Eastern Front. Between June and September 1941, the division served under Army Group South, and was then transferred to Army Group Center, where it remained until its destruction in 1944. The division fought at the Battle of Kiev between August and September 1941 and then advanced via Tula towards Oryol, where it remained through the year 1942 and into August 1943. Until June 1944, it was driven back to Babruysk via Gomel.

The division was destroyed at Babruysk during Operation Bagration. The division was formally dissolved on 3 August 1944.

== Superior formations ==
Organizational chart of the 296th Infantry Division
Year	Month	Army Corps	Army	Army Group	Area
1940	June	OKH reserves.			
1940	July	XIII	9th Army	Army Group A	Belgium
1940	August	V	16th Army	Army Group A	Lille
1940	September – December	XXIII	16th Army	Army Group A	Lille
1941	January	XXIII	16th Army	Army Group A	Lille
1941	February	Army reserves.	16th Army	Army Group A	Lille
1941	March	Army reserves.	17th Army	Army Group B	Poland
1941	April	IX	17th Army	Army Group B	Poland
1941	May	IV	17th Army	Army Group A	Poland
1941	June	IV	17th Army	Army Group South	Rava-Ruska
1941	July	Army Group reserves.		Army Group South	Zhytomyr
1941	August	XXXIV	6th Army	Army Group South	Kiev
1941	September	XVII	6th Army	Army Group South	Kiev
1941	October	XXXV	2nd Panzer Group	Army Group Center	Oryol
1941	November	XXXV	2nd Army	Army Group Center	Tula
1941	December	Army Group reserves.		Army Group Center	Belyov
1942	January – December	LIII	2nd Panzer Army	Army Group Center	Oryol
1943	January – April	LIII	2nd Panzer Army	Army Group Center	Oryol
1943	May – August	LV	2nd Panzer Army	Army Group Center	Oryol
1943	September – December	XXIII	9th Army	Army Group Center	Gomel, Babruysk
1944	January – June	XXXV	9th Army	Army Group Center	Babruysk
1944	July	"Status unknown", division dissolved 3 August 1944.			

== Noteworthy individuals ==
- Wilhelm Stemmermann, divisional commander between 1 January 1941 and 8 January 1942.
- Friedrich Krischer, divisional commander between 8 January 1942 and 3 April 1943.
- Karl Faulenbach, divisional commander between 3 April 1943 and 1 January 1944.
- Arthur Kullmer, divisional commander between 16 January 1943 and 19 June 1944.
