= Takatsukasa Fusasuke =

Takatsukasa Fusasuke (鷹司 房輔; June 22, 1637 – March 1, 1700), son of Norihira, was a Kugyō or Japanese court noble of the early Edo period (1603–1868).

Fusasuke held regent positions as sesshō (from 1664 to 1668) and as kampaku (from 1668 to 1682).

Kanehiro and Sanesuke were his sons who he had with a daughter of the second head of the Chōshū Domain Mōri Hidenari.

== Family ==
Parents

- Father: Takatsukasa Norihira (鷹司 教平, 14 February 1609 – 7 November 1668)
- Mother: Tamemitsu Reizei's daughter (冷泉為満)

Consorts and issues:

- Wife: Lady Takeko no Oe (大江竹子, d. 1679), Hedenari Mori's daughter (毛利秀就)
  - Takatsukasa Kanehiro (鷹司 兼熙, 17 January 1659 – 24 December 1725), 1st son
  - Saionji Sanesuke (西園寺実輔, 14 June 1661 – 4 February 1685), 2nd son
- Concubine: Court lady (家女房)
  - Takatsukasa Sukenobu (鷹司 輔信, 1668 - 1741), 3rd son
  - Fusa (房演, 1670-1737), 4th son
  - Shigaki (信覚, 1674 – 1701), 5th son
  - Tazuru (田鶴君, d.1683), 6th son
  - Nikken (日顕, d.1690), 7th son
  - Eight son
  - Kowaka (小若君, d.1688), 9th son
  - Ryuuson (隆尊, 1691-1764), 10th son – a priest at Daijō-in
  - Ichijo Kaneka (一条 兼香, 12 January 1693 – 21 September 1751), 11th son – adopted by Ichijo Kanetaru
