= Reiichi =

- Gender: Male

Origin
- Origin: Japanese
- Meaning: Different meanings depending on the kanji used

Reiichi (written: 礼一) is a masculine Japanese given name. Notable people with the name include:

- Reiichi Ikegami (池上 礼一; born 1983), Japanese footballer
- Reiichi Mikata (三ヶ田 礼一; born 1967), Japanese Nordic combined skier
