= Matsudono Motofusa =

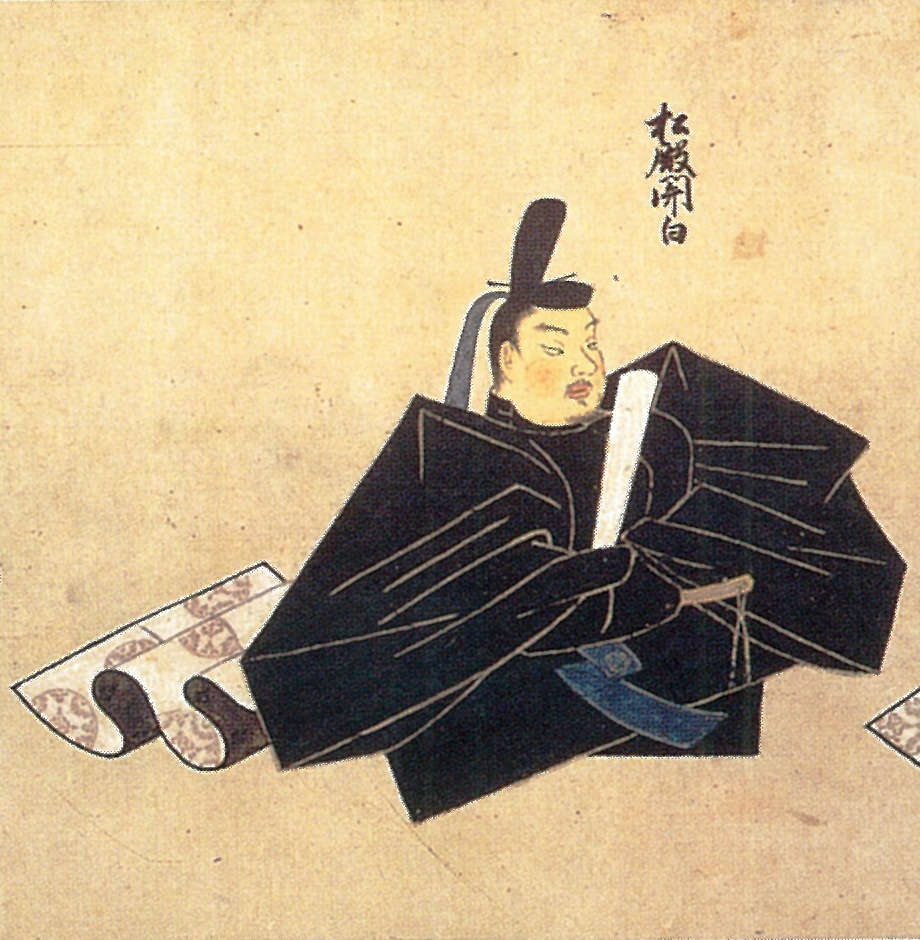
Fujiwara no Motofusa

Fujiwara no Motofusa (藤原 基房; 1144 – February 1, 1230) was an imperial regent in the late 12th century, serving both Emperor Rokujō and Emperor Takakura. He was also called Matsudono Motofusa (松殿 基房), as he came from the village of Matsudono, near Kyoto. Fujiwara no Tadataka and Matsudono Moroie were his first and third sons, respectively.

Though wielding great power as sesshō and kampaku, Motofusa was prevented from becoming the head of the Fujiwara family by the political maneuvers of Taira no Kiyomori. An incident in 1170, while Motofusa was on his way to the Hōjuji Palace, further cemented his rivalry with the Taira clan. The Regent, along with a large retinue, was making his way to the palace for a ceremony which the cloistered Emperor Go-Shirakawa was supposed to attend, when a young boy, Taira no Sukemori, refused to make way for him and his retinue. As a result, the Regent's men smashed Sukemori's carriage and humiliated him. Sukemori was a grandson of Kiyomori and so, after a few failed attempts at reprisal, followers of Taira no Shigemori (Sukemori's father) attacked the Regent's men on their way to a solemn ceremony, dragging them from their horses and humiliating them. These events, while seemingly minor on the surface, led to a rift between Emperor Go-Shirakawa and the Taira, and therefore to closer relations between Go-Shirakawa and the Minamoto, enemies of the Taira.

He is the maternal grandfather of the founder of Sōtō Zen Buddhism in Japan, Eihei Dōgen, son of his daughter Ishi.

In 1179, he was ordained as a Buddhist monk and took the Dharma name Zenkan (善観). When he died in 1230, he was given the posthumous Buddhist names Nakayamain (中山院) and Bodaiin (菩提院).

== Service as regent ==
- 1166–1168: Sessho under Emperor Rokujō.
- 1168–1172: Sessho under Emperor Takakura.
- 1172–1179: Kampaku under Emperor Takakura.
