= Kazuo Hiramatsu =

Japanese academic (1947–2020)

Kazuo Hiramatsu (平松 一夫, Hiramatsu Kazuo; 10 August 1947 – 2 December 2020) was a Japanese scholar of international accounting, who served as the 17th President of Kwansei Gakuin University in Japan from 2002 to 2008. He graduated from Kwansei Gakuin University and received his Ph.D. in International Accounting. He was a visiting scholar at the University of Washington in 1977-1979, and a visiting professor at the University of Glasgow in 1991. His research interests are in financial accounting and international accounting.

Hiramatsu served as a Professor of Accounting at the School of Business Administration and Graduate School of Business Administration. The scholar also served as the head of Admission Department since 1997-1999.

Within his country, he served as a director of the Financial Accounting Standards Foundation; a member of the CPA-Auditing Oversight Board and the Business Accounting Deliberation Council of the Japanese Ministry of Finance.

Hiramatsu was the Vice President-at-Large of the International Association for Accounting Education & Research, the President of the JAIAS and the 2005-2006 International Member-at-Large of AAA Council of American Accounting Association. He also served for International Accounting Standards Committee as a member of the Strategy Working Party during 1997-1999.
