= Konoe Iehisa =

Japanese court noble

Konoe Iehisa (近衛 家久; June 17, 1687 – September 11, 1737), son of regent Iehiro, was a kugyō or Japanese court noble of the Edo period (1603–1868). He held a regent position kampaku from 1726 to 1736. He had two consorts: daughters of Shimazu Tsunataka and Shimazu Yoshitaka, third and fourth heads of the Satsuma Domain, respectively. With the latter, he had a son, Konoe Uchisaki, and two daughters who were consort of Tokugawa Munechika, ninth head of Owari Domain, and Morihime who was consort of Tokugawa Munetake, founder of Tayasu-Tokugawa.

== Ancestry ==
Ancestors of Konoe Iehisa

16. Konoe Nobuhiro (1599–1649)
8. Konoe Hisatsugu (1622 – 1653)
4. Konoe Motohiro (1648–1722)
2. Konoe Iehiro (1667–1736)
20. Emperor Go-Yozei (1571–1617) (=24)
10. Emperor Go-Mizunoo (1596–1680) (=10)
21. Konoe Sakiko (1575–1630) (=25)
5. Princess Tsuneko (1642–1702)
22. Sono Motonari (1604-1655) (=26)
11. Sono Kuniko (1602–1656) (=13)
23. daughter of Tani Moritomo (=27)
1. Konoe Iehisa (1687–1737)
24. Emperor Go-Yozei (1571–1617) (=20)
12. Emperor Go-Mizunoo (1596–1680) (=12)
25. Konoe Sakiko (1575–1630) (=21)
6. Emperor Reigen (1654–1732)
26. Sono Motonari (1604-1655) (=22)
13. Sono Kuniko (1602–1656) (=11)
27. daughter of Tani Moritomo (=23)
3. Princess Ken'shi (1669–1688)
14. Bōjō Toshihiro
7. Bōjō Fusako (1652–1676)
