= Ichijō Kaneka =

Ichijō Kaneka (一条 兼香; January 12, 1692 – September 21, 1751), son of regent Takatsukasa Fusasuke and adopted son of regent Kaneteru, was a kugyō (court noble) of the Edo period (1603–1868) of Japan. He held a regents position kampaku from 1737 to 1746. He married a daughter of Asano Tsunanaga, fourth head of Hiroshima Domain, and an adopted daughter of Ikeda Tsunamasa, second head of Okayama Domain.

== Family ==
- Father: Takatsukasa Fusasuke
- Mother: daughter of Yamashina Tokiyuki
- Foster father: Ichijo Kaneteru
- Wives:
  - daughter of Asano Tsunanaga
  - Tomoko, an adopted daughter of Ikeda Tsunamasa
- Concubine: Commoner
- Children:
  - Ichijō Michika by Commoner
  - Takatsukasa Mototeru
  - Ikuko, consort of Tokugawa Munemasa
  - Akiko, consort of Tokugawa Munetada
  - Shigeko, consort of Tokugawa Munemoto
  - Daigo Kanezumi (1747-1758)
  - Ichijo Tomiko, consort of Emperor Momozono and mother of Emperor Go-Momozono by Commoner
