= Takatsukasa Hisasuke =

Kuge or Japanese court noble of the Edo period

Takatsukasa Hisasuke (鷹司 尚輔; 1726 – April 19, 1733), son of Konoe Iehiro and adopted son of Fusahiro, was a kuge or Japanese court noble of the Edo period (1603–1868). He died at age 8 of illness after inheriting the Takatsukasa family at age 5. His wife and he did not have a son.

== Family ==
Parents

- Biological Father: Takatsukasa Fusahiro (鷹司 房熙, September 6, 1710 – June 9, 1730),
- Father: Konoe Iehiro (近衛 家熈[1], July 24, 1667 – November 5, 1736)
- Mother: Unknown concubine

Consorts and issues:

- Wife: Unknown
