= Kazahaya family =

Japanese aristocratic family

Kazahaya family 風早家
- Mon: Katabami-ni-karahana
- Home province: Yamashiro Province
- Parent house: Fujiwara clan
- Titles: Viscount
- Founder: Kazahaya Sanetane
- Founding year: 17th century
- Dissolution: 1959
- Ruled until: 1947

The Kazahaya family (風早家, Kazahaya-ke) was a Japanese aristocratic family descending from the Fujiwara clan. Its kuge family rank was urinke, the third highest.

In the Edo period, the family held high offices in the Great Council of State and served at the Imperial Court. After the Meiji Restoration, the family was appointed Viscount. The family had a long tradition of practicing Japanese tea ceremony.

== Origins ==
The Kazahaya family was founded in the early Edo period by Middle Counselor Kazahaya Sanetane. Sanetane was the second son of Major Counselor Anekōji Kinkage, who was a descendant of Fujiwara no Kinsue, the founder of the Kanin lineage. Through Fujiwara no Kinsue, the family descends from the Hokke house of the Fujiwara clan, a powerful family of Japanese imperial regents and court nobility, founded by Fujiwara no Kamatari in the 7th century.

== History ==
=== Edo period ===
In the Edo period, the family held land worth 30 koku.

Kazahaya Sanetane, the founder of the Kazehaya family, learned Japanese tea ceremony from Sen no Sōtan. Ever since, the heads of the Kazehaya family served in the Imperial Court practicing Japanese tea ceremony.

Apart from Japanese tea ceremony, the heads of the Kazahaya family also practiced kōdō, and are known for founding the Kazahaya style kōdō.

=== After Meiji period ===
After the Meiji Restoration, Kazahaya Kinkoto was made Viscount in 1884 and served as the high priest of Kashihara Shrine.

== Family heads ==
- Kazahaya Sanetane (1632 - 1711)
- Kazahaya Kinnaga (1665 - 1723)
- Kazahaya Sanetsumi (1691 - 1753)
- Kazahaya Kimio (1721 - 1787)
- Kazahaya Saneaki (1760 - 1816)
- Kazahaya Kimimoto (1791 - 1853)
- Kazahaya Sanetoyo (1815 - 1847)
- Kazahaya Kinkoto (1841 - 1905)
- Kazahaya Saneyasu (1873 - 1919)
- Kazahaya Kimitake (1906 - 1959)
