= Takatsukasa Sukenobu =

Takatsukasa Sukenobu (鷹司 輔信; 1668 - 1741), son of regent Fusasuke, was a kugyo or Japanese court noble of the Edo period (1603–1868). While he did not hold any court positions, he had at least two daughters; Yaehime (1689–1746), adopted by shōgun Tokugawa Tsunayoshi, married a head of Mito-Tokugawa Tokugawa Yoshizane, and the other (?-1739) married the fifth head of the Chōshū Domain Mori Yoshihiro. He was brother-in-law of Shōgun Tokugawa Tsunayoshi.
