= Konoe Uchisaki =

Japanese court noble

Konoe Uchisaki (近衛 内前; July 28, 1728 – April 28, 1785), son of regent Iehisa, was a kugyō or Japanese court noble of the Edo period (1603–1868). He held regent positions kampaku from 1757 to 1762 and from 1772 to 1778 and sesshō from 1762 to 1772. He married a daughter of Tokugawa Muneharu, seventh head of Owari Domain, and an adopted daughter of Tokugawa Munetaka, fifth head of Mito Domain. With the former, he had a son Konoe Tsunehiro. With the latter, he adopted a daughter, who was later a consort of Date Shigemura, seventh head of Sendai Domain. He was also the father of Konoe Koreko, a court lady of Emperor Go-Momozono and adopting mother of Emperor Kōkaku.
