= Konoe Michitsugu =

Konoe Michitsugu (近衛 道嗣; 1333 – 1387), son of Mototsugu, was a kugyō or Japanese court noble of the Muromachi period (1336–1573). He held a regent position kampaku from 1361 to 1363. Kanetsugu was his son.
