= Reiji Hiramatsu =

Japanese Nihonga painter

Reiji Hiramatsu (平松 礼二 Hiramatsu Reiji, b. 1941 in Tokyo) is a Japanese Nihonga painter.

== Biography ==
His father was a civil servant who moved the family to Nagoya in 1946, where Reiji Hiramatsu would grow up. Early on he developed interest in the traditional painting techniques of Nihonga, however on behest of his parents he first studied law and economics at the Aichi University. He began his artistic career after graduating and developed into one of the foremost representatives of Nihonga. In 1967 he married his wife Hiroko, who would encourage him in his pursuit of painting.

In 1994 he visited the Musée de l'Orangerie and Giverny in France. He was inspired by Claude Monet and produced a number of paintings and byōbu screens that re-interpret Monet's Water Lilies, which in turn originally were inspired by Japonisme. Reiji's Water Lilies were exhibited in 2013 at the Museum of Impressionism in Giverny, as well as the Museum of Asian Art in Berlin.

In 2013 he also donated 34 pieces, including “Japanese Apricot Banquet” and “Mt. Daikan in Golden Yellow in Autumn”, to the Yugawara Art Museum.
