= Konoe Tadatsugu =

Konoe Tadatsugu (近衛 忠嗣; 1383 – 1454), son of Kanetsugu, was a kugyō or Japanese court noble of the Muromachi period (1336–1573). He held a regent position kampaku from 1408 to 1409. With a commoner he had a son Fusatsugu.
