= Konoe Kanetsugu =

Konoe Kanetsugu (近衛 兼嗣; 1360–1388), son of Michitsugu, was a kugyō or Japanese court noble of the Muromachi period (1336–1573). He held the regent position sessho in 1388. With a commoner, he had a son named Tadatsugu.

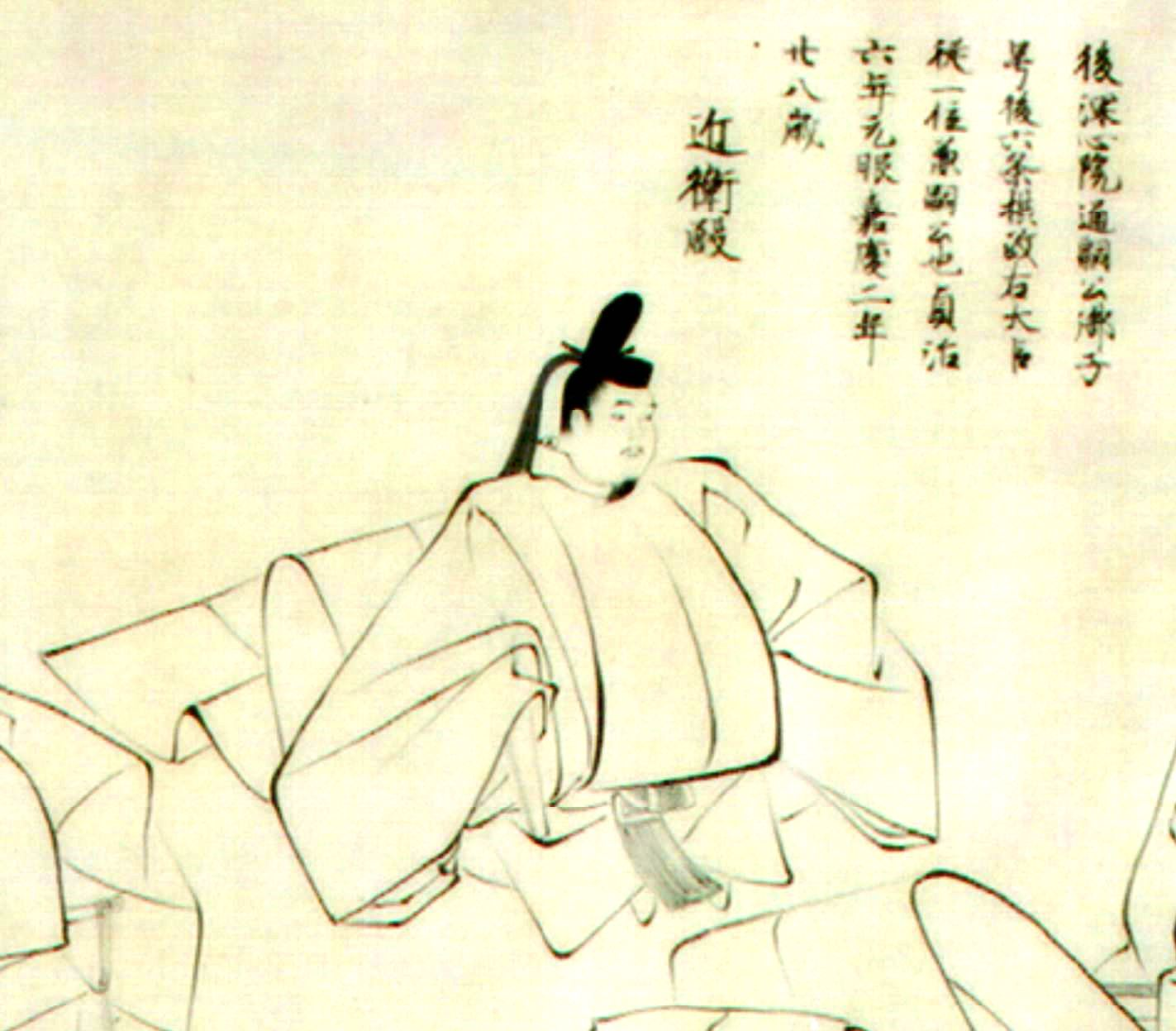
