= Matsudaira Yorishige =

Japanese daimyō

Matsudaira Yorishige (松平 頼重; August 7, 1622 – May 24, 1695) was a Japanese daimyō of the early Edo period, who ruled the Takamatsu Domain. Yorishige was the first son of Tokugawa Yorifusa, and Tokugawa Mitsukuni was the third son of Tokugawa Yorifusa, the first Tokugawa daimyō of Mito Domain; this made him the grandson of Tokugawa Ieyasu.

One of his daughters married Takatsukasa Kanehiro.

== Ancestry ==
Ancestors of Matsudaira Yorishige

16. Matsudaira Kiyoyasu (1511–1535)
8. Matsudaira Hirotada (1526–1549)
17. Aoki
4. Tokugawa Ieyasu, 1st Tokugawa shōgun (1543–1616)
18. Mizuno Tadamasa (1493–1543)
9. O-dainokata (1528–1602)
19. Keyōin (1492–1560)
2. Tokugawa Yorifusa, 1st daimyō of Mito (1603–1661)
20. Masaki Tokitada (1521–1576)
10. Masaki Yoritada (1551–1622)
21. Kasutani
5. Yōjuin (1580–1653)
11. Hōjō
1. Matsudaira Yorishige, 1st Lord of Takamatsu
6. Tani Shigenori
3. Kyūshōin (1604–1662)

Preceded by Mizunoya Katsutaka	1st Daimyō of Shimodate (Mito-Matsudaira); 1639–1642	Succeeded by Masuyama Masamitsu
Preceded by Ikoma Takatoshi	1st Daimyō of Takamatsu (Mito-Matsudaira); 1642–1673	Succeeded by Matsudaira Yoritsune
