= Konoe Mototsugu =

Konoe Mototsugu (近衛 基嗣; 1305 – 1354), son of Tsunehira, was a kugyō or Japanese court noble of the Kamakura period (1185–1333). He held a regent position kampaku from 1337 to 1338. With a daughter of sangi Fujii Tsuguzane he had a son, Michitsugu.

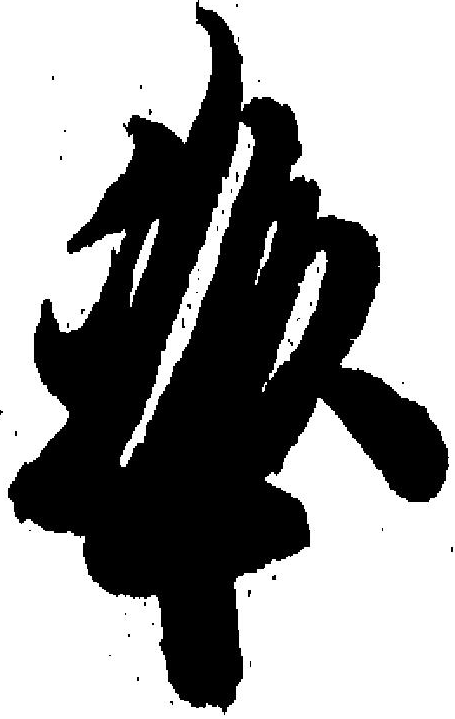
Signature of Konoe Mototsugu
