= Fujiwara no Takatada =

Fujiwara no Takatada (藤原 隆忠; 1163 - 1245), first son of regent Matsudono Motofusa, was a Kugyō (high-ranking Japanese official) of the late Heian and Kamakura periods.

Despite being first-born, he was treated as if he were not, while his stepbrother Moroie inherited the male-line. Hence, he called himself Daikakuji Sadaijin (大覚寺左大臣), avoiding the use of the name Matsudono. In 1220, just before the Jōkyū War, he retired from politics, becoming a Buddhist monk.

In recent years scholars have suspected that he is actually the author of Rokudai Shōjiki (六代勝事記).
