= Konoe Tadahiro =

Japanese court noble (1808–1898)

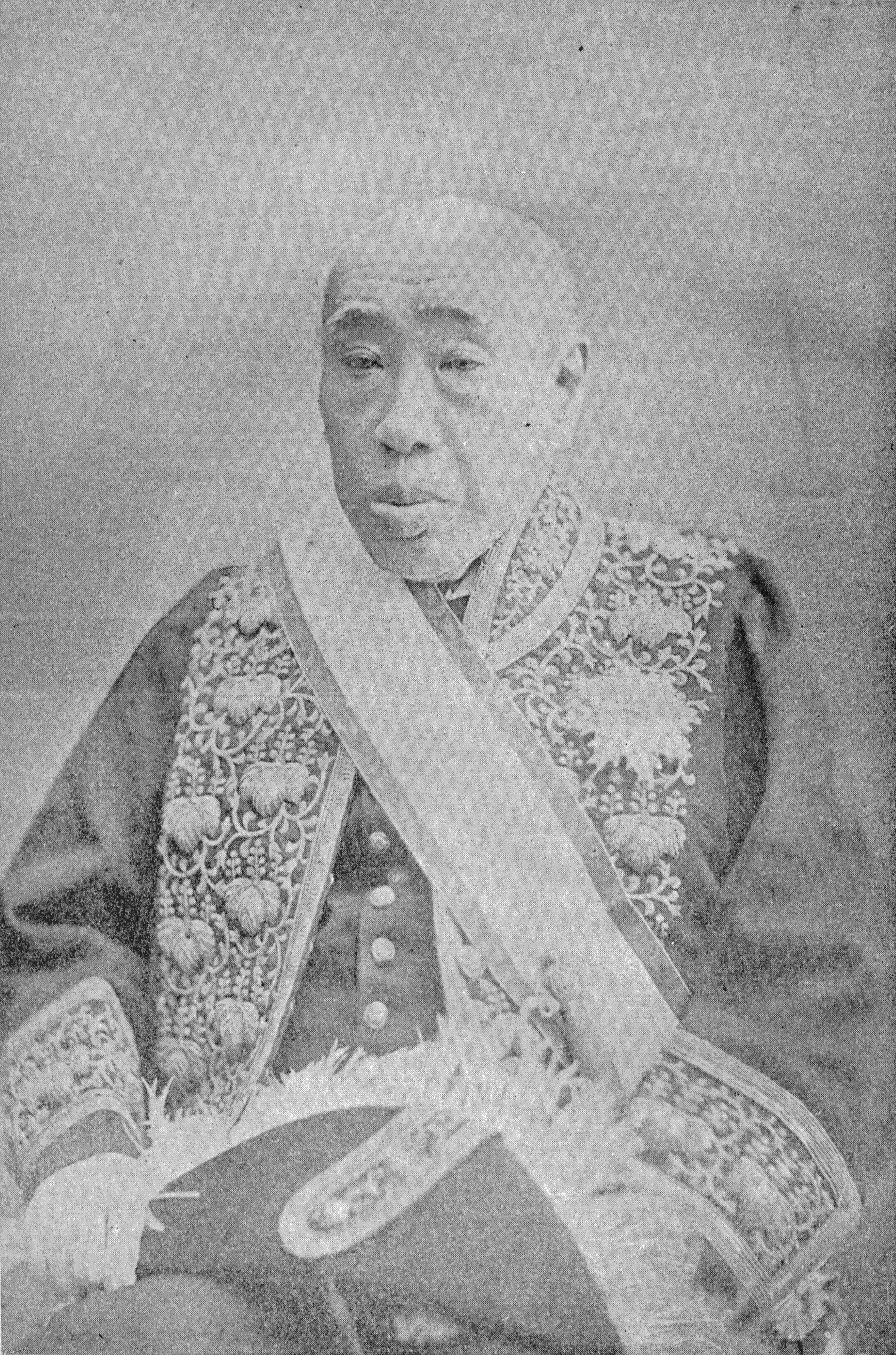
Konoe Tadahiro

Prince Konoe Tadahiro (近衛 忠熙; 4 September 1808 – 18 March 1898), was a Japanese court noble who served in the regent position kampaku from 1862 to 1863.

He was the eldest son of Konoe Motosaki. His consort was Shimazu Kyoko, an adopted daughter of Shimazu Narioki, tenth head of Satsuma Domain. With her he had a son Tadafusa. After his son's death he adopted his grandson Atsumaro as heir. He also adopted a daughter of Shimazu Nariakira, named Atsuko or Atsuhime, who was a daughter of the Shimazu Imaizumi branch. After adoption Atsuhime changed her name to Fujiwara no Fumiko, and later she became a consort of Tokugawa Iesada and took the name Tenshōin. Following the Meiji Restoration, he was granted the title of prince.

== Honors ==
Translated from the article in the Japanese Wikipedia

- Prince (1884)
- Grand Cordon of the Order of the Rising Sun (March 1885)
- Grand Cordon of the Order of the Rising Sun with Paulownia Flowers (26 September 1895)

=== Order of precedence ===
- Senior fifth rank (26th day, second month of the 13th year of Bunka (1816))
- Fourth rank (28th day, third month of the 13th year of Bunka (1816)
- Senior fourth rank (28th day, 12th month of the 13th year of Bunka (1816))
- Third rank (Seventh day, third month of the 14th year of Bunka (1817)
- Senior third rank (11th day, eighth month of the fourth year of Bunsei (1821))
- Second rank (16th day, third month of the sixth year of Bunsei (1823))
- Senior second rank (Fourth day, sixth month of the seventh year of Bunsei (1824))
- First rank (Fifth day, sixth month of the fifth year of Tenpo (1834), later entered Buddhist orders and was restored to the rank on the seventh day, sixth month of the second year of Bunkyu (1862))
- Senior first rank (17 March 1904; posthumous)

Preceded by Kujō Naotada	Kampaku; 1862–1863	Succeeded by Takatsukasa Sukehiro
