= Konoe Tadafusa =

Konoe Tadafusa (近衛 忠房; 24 September 1838 – 16 July 1873), son of regent Tadahiro with his wife Shimazu Kyoko, was a kugyō or Japanese court noble of the late Edo period (1603–1868). He did not hold any regent position kampaku or sesshō. His consort was Shimazu Mitsuko, an adopted daughter of Shimazu Nariakira, eleventh head of Satsuma Domain. The couple had a daughter, Konoe Hiroko, who later married Tokugawa Iesato, the sixteenth head of Tokugawa family and bore him Tokugawa Iemasa, the seventeenth head of the Tokugawa clan. He adopted a son of Konoe Tadahiro as their son Atsumaro. He predeceased his father at the age of 36. His son Hidemaru was adopted by Tsugaru Tsuguakira, the last daimyō of the Hirosaki Domain.

Konoe held several positions within the Shinto hierarchy, including head priest of the Ise Jingū shrine.
