= Konoe Atsumaro =

Japanese peer and politician (1863–1904)

Prince Konoe Atsumaro
- 近衛 篤麿
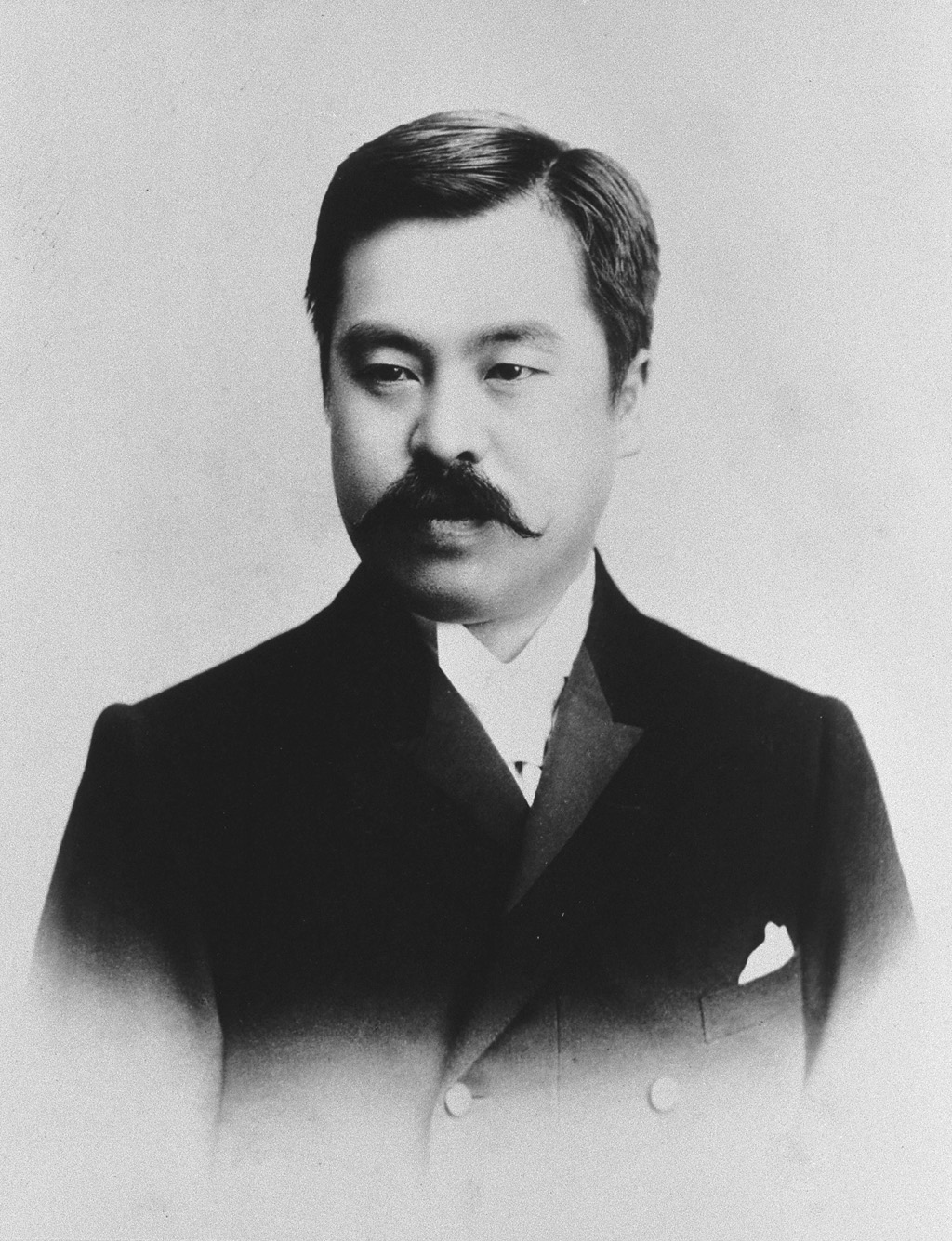

President of the House of Peers
- In office 3 October 1896 – 4 December 1903
- Monarch: Meiji
- Vice President: Nagashige Kuroda
- Preceded by: Hachisuka Mochiaki
- Succeeded by: Tokugawa Iesato

Member of the Privy Council
- In office 4 December 1903 – 2 January 1904
- Monarch: Meiji

Member of the House of Peers
- In office February 1890 – 2 January 1904 Hereditary peerage

Personal details
- Born: 10 August 1863 Kyoto, Yamashiro, Japan
- Died: 1 January 1904 (aged 40) Shinjuku, Tokyo, Japan
- Spouse: Maeda Sawako
- Children: Fumimaro; Hidemaro; Naomaro; Tadamaro
- Parent: Konoe Tadafusa (father)
- Relatives: Konoe family
- Education: Leipzig University
- Occupation: Politician, educator

Prince Konoe Atsumaro (近衛 篤麿; 10 August 1863 – 1 January 1904) was a Japanese politician and journalist of the Meiji era. He served as the 3rd President of the House of Peers and 7th President of the Gakushūin Peer's School in Meiji period Japan. He was the father of Prime Minister Fumimaro Konoe and the great-grandfather of Prime Minister Morihiro Hosokawa.

== Political career ==
After the Meiji Restoration, the Konoe family were devolved from the ranks of the nobility and given the peerage title of Prince or Duke (koshaku) under the new kazoku peerage system. From 1885 to 1890, Konoe visited Europe, attending the University of Bonn and University of Leipzig in Germany. After returning to Japan, he became a member of the House of Peers and in 1895 became president of Gakushuin Peer's School.

Later Konoe served as the 3rd President of the House of Peers, presiding over its 10th through 18th sessions from 3 October 1896 to 4 December 1903. From 1903 he concurrently served as a Privy Councillor.

Domestically, Konoe was a strong critic of clan-based politics, which continued to dominate the political scene in Japan. In terms of foreign policy, Konoe was a central figure in the Pan-Asian movement. He established a Pan-Asian political movement called the East Asia Common Culture Society (東亜同文会, Toa Dobunkai) which promoted mutual understanding and improvement in relations between Japan and China after the First Sino-Japanese War. The society opened a college in Nanjing called the East Asia Common Cultural College (東亜同文書院, Toa Dōbun Shoin) in 1900, which was relocated to Shanghai in 1901. The college recruited students from Japan wishing to learn the Chinese language and Chinese culture, and sponsored a school in Tokyo for Chinese students seeking higher education in Japan (its successor institution being that of Aichi University (愛知大学, Aichi Daigaku)). The society also published a scholarly journal and an 11,000-page report, entitled A Comprehensive Book on the Economics Conditions in China. Graduates of both schools were highly sought after by the Japanese military, Japanese secret intelligence services and ultranationalist organizations for their language skills and in-depth knowledge of China. Many of its graduates later worked for the government of Manchukuo in the 1930s.

In August 1903, Konoe established the Anti-Russia Society (対露同志会, Tairo Dōshikai) which pushed for a hard-line foreign policy towards the Russian Empire, which it perceived as a threat to the independence of China, Korea, and Japan. Konoe personally urged that Japan declare war on Russia, but died before the start of the Russo-Japanese War in late 1904.

His grave is at the Konoe family cemetery at Daitoku-ji in Kyoto.

== Notes ==
Political offices
Preceded by Hachisuka Mochiaki	President of the House of Peers; 1896–1903	Succeeded by Tokugawa Iesato
