= Konoe Motohiro =

Japanese court noble (1648–1722)

Konoe Motohiro 近衛 基熈
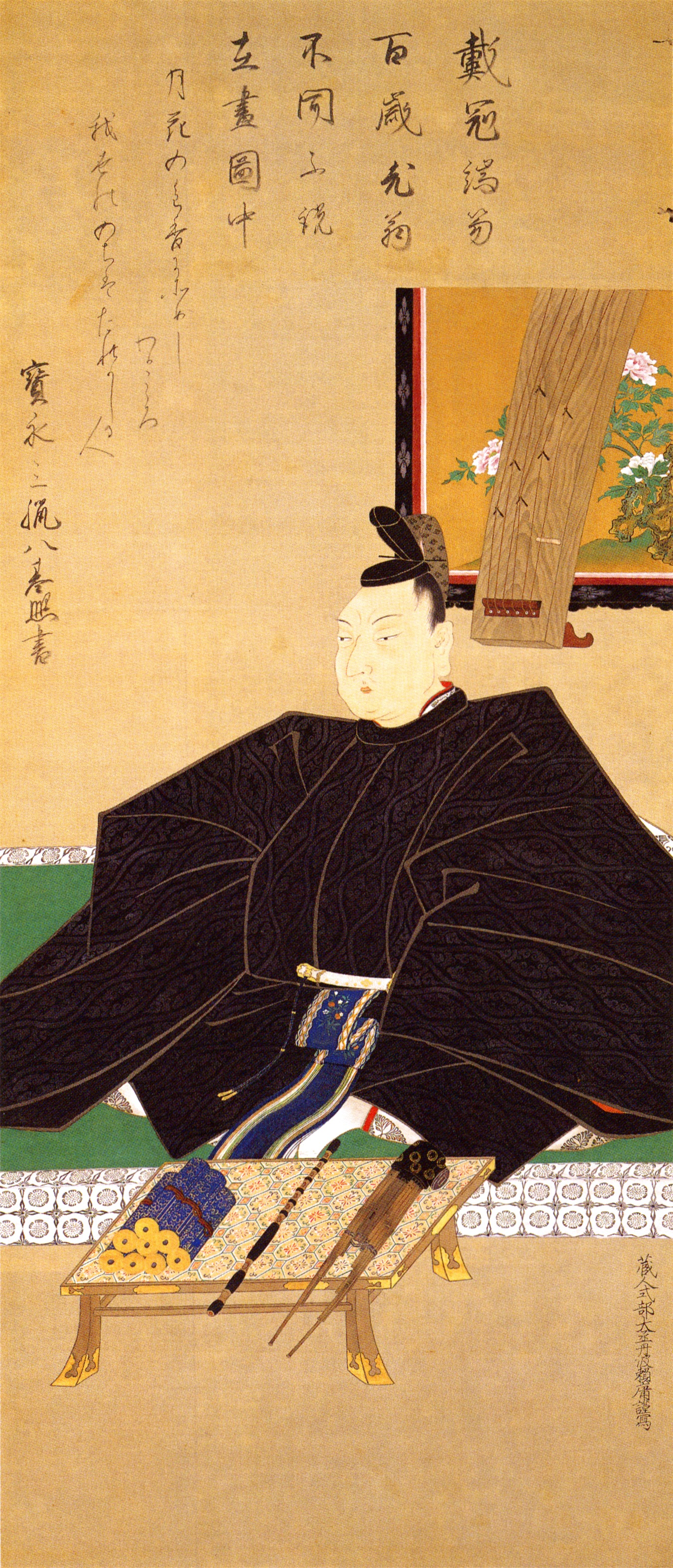
- Konoe Motohiro. Illustration by Nishiki-no-koji Yoritsune, housed at Yōmei Bunko.

Chancellor (Daijō-daijin) of Japan
- Tenure: 15 November 1709 – 8 January 1710
- Successor: Konoe Iehiro
- Born: 28 April 1648
- Died: 13 October 1722 (aged 74)
- Buried: Daitoku-ji
- Family: Kujō
- Father: Konoe Hisatsugu
- Mother: Lady Yorin-in

Konoe Motohiro (近衛 基熈; 28 April 1648 – 13 October 1722), Tajimaru (多治丸) in his childhood, was a kugyō or Japanese court noble of the Edo period (1603–1868). He held a regent position kampaku from 1690 to 1703. Motohiro was also a great-grandson of Emperor Go-Yozei through a junior line.

== Early life ==
He was a son of regent Konoe Hisatsugu and a concubine. Motohiro was not considered a legitimate member at first, but his father Hisatsugu and his wife, Princess Onna-ni, a daughter of Emperor Go-Mizunoo, had no child and Hisatsu died in Motohiro's childhood. Thus by an imperial order from Go-Mizunoo, Motohiro was installed in the Konoe lineage, and grew up under imperial protection.

In 1654 he performed his genpuku ceremony and entered adulthood and therefore courtier life. In 1664 he married Princess Joshi, another daughter of Emperor Go-Mizunoo and his consort. With her he had a son, Iehiro, and a daughter, Hiroko, who was a consort of Tokugawa Ienobu, the 6th shōgun of the Tokugawa shogunate.

== Family ==
Parents

- Father: Konoe Hisatsugu (近衛 尚嗣, 1622 – 1653)
- Mother: Lady Yorin-in (瑤林院), a court lady

Consorts and issues:

- Wife: Imperial Princess Tsuneko (常子内親王; 8 April 1642 – 17 September 1702), daughter of Emperor Go-Mizunoo
  - Konoe Hiroko (30 April 1666 – 13 April 1741), Wife of Tokugawa Ienobu, first daughter
  - Konoe Iehiro (近衛 家熈, 24 July 1667 – 5 November 1736), first son
  - Ōinomika Nobuname (大炊御門信名, 26 Mai 1669 – 20 November 1684), second son
- Unknown concubine
  - Konoe Kanmori (近衛寛守, 1713 –1730), third son
  - Konoe Shūsi (近衞脩子), Wife of Prince Kan'in-no-miya Naohito (閑院宮直仁親王), second daughter

== Political career ==
After his entrance to the court, he served three emperors: Emperor Go-Mizunoo, Emperor Reigen and Emperor Higashiyama. Go-Mizunoo was his protector since his childhood, so his early career was prospective along with his noble lineage. But Emperor Reigen did not get along with the Tokugawa shogunate, and considered Motohiro sympathetic to the Shogunate, hence his career in Reigen's court was not as splendid. Tokugawa Tsunayoshi, the shogun at that time, was not warm to Ienobu at all, one of the candidates for his successor, hence also Motohiro, as the father-in-law of Ienobu.

In Higashiyama's court, Motohiro however gained power again. He served as kampaku, the most powerful courtier from 1690 to 1703. After he quit, he had his supporters, including his own son, succeed the kampaku position respectively, and kept his influence. In 1704 the Tokugawa shogunate designated Ienobu, Motohiro's son-in-law, the successor of Tsunayoshi, hence the future shogun. His relation to the shogunate was therefore strengthened. Motohiro visited Edo twice, and was even welcomed to give political opinions, however it made the terms between ex-Emperor Reigen and him worse. Emperor Reigen even cursed him at Shimogamo Shrine, and accused him of being a "bad subject who privatizes and bends laws and justice" (私曲邪佞の悪臣) in his cursing prayer. However Motohiro was not always a supporter of Shogunate politics, and publicly objected to the Shogunate over some of their pressure on the imperial court.

In 1722 he became a monk and was named Yuzan (悠山). He died in this year and was buried at Daitoku-ji.

He wrote a diary from 1655 until his death, later titled Diary of Lord Motohiro (基熈公記).
