= Konoe Iehiro =

Japanese court noble (1667–1736)

Konoe Iehiro 近衛 家熈
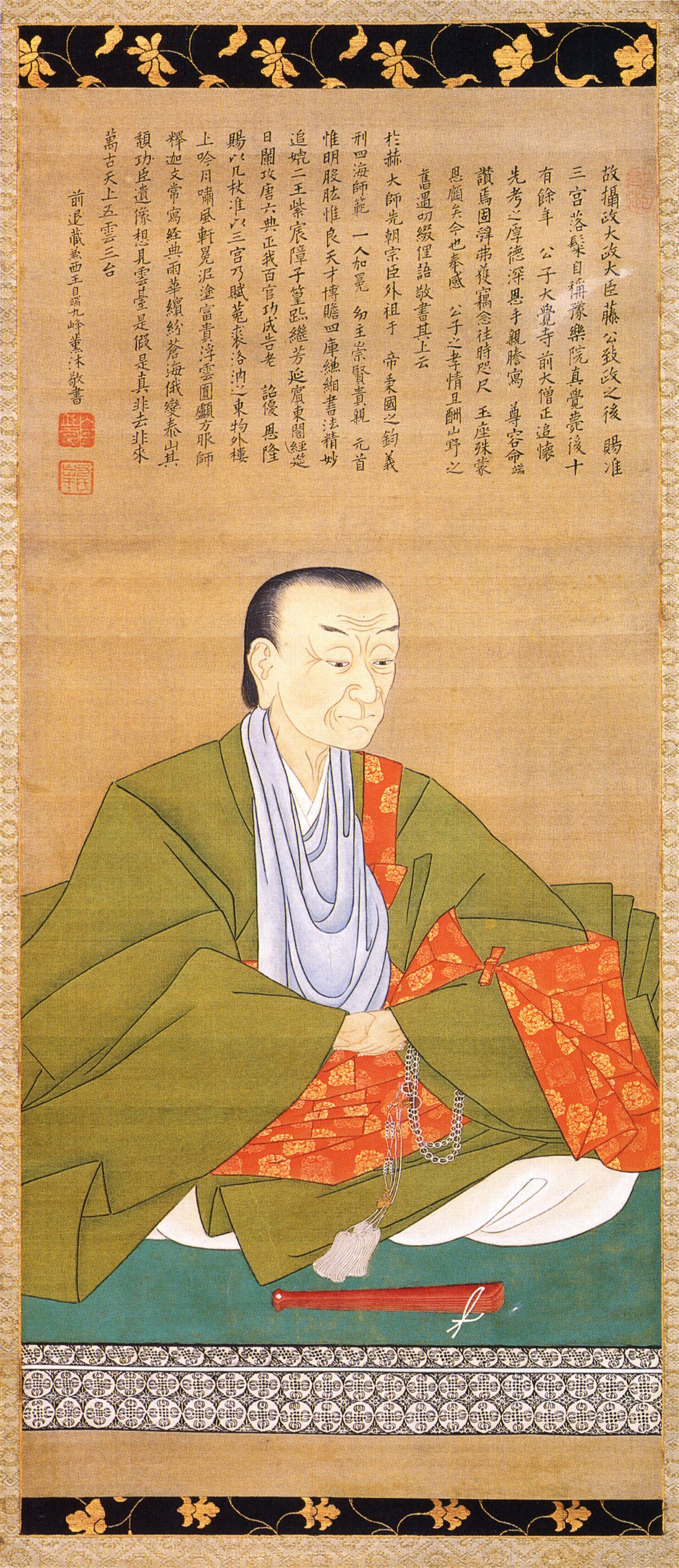

Chancellor (Daijō-daijin) of Japan
- In office 12 February 1711 – 10 September 1710
- Succeeded by: Konoe Iehisa

Kampaku (1st)
- In office 1707–1709

Personal details
- Born: 24 July 1667 Japan
- Died: November 5, 1736 (aged 69) Japan
- Spouse(s): Imperial Princess Ken'shi; Machiriji Ryōshi; Unknown concubine
- Children: Lady Tokukun; Konoe Iehisa; Takatsukasa Fusahiro; Konoe Hisako; Konoe Yasuko; Takara; Shinsei; Takatsukasa Hisasuke; Masahime; Lady Fusako
- Parent(s): Konoe Motohiro (father); Imperial Princess Tsuneko (mother)

Konoe Iehiro (近衛 家熈; July 24, 1667 – November 5, 1736), son of regent Motohiro, was a kugyō or Japanese court noble of the Edo period (1603–1868). He held a regent position kampaku from 1707 to 1709 and from 1709 to 1712.

== Family ==
Parents

- Father: Konoe Motohiro (近衛 基熈, 28 April 1648 – 13 October 1722)
- Mother: Imperial Princess Tsuneko (常子内親王; 8 April 1642 – 17 September 1702), daughter of Emperor Go-Mizunoo

Consorts and issues:

- Wife: Imperial Princess Ken'shi (憲子内親王; 1669–1688), second daughter of Emperor Reigen
  - Lady Tokukun (徳君, 1686-1721), Wife of Tokudaiji Kintake (徳大寺公全), first daughter
  - Konoe Iehisa (近衛 家久, June 17, 1687 – September 11, 1737), first son
- Wife: Machiriji Ryōshi (町尻量子), daughter of Machiriji Kenryō (町尻兼量)
  - Takatsukasa Fusahiro (鷹司 房熙, 6 September 1710 – 9 June 1730), second son
  - Konoe Hisako (近衛尚子, 1702 – 1720), Empress Consort of Emperor Nakamikado (中御門天皇), third daughter
  - Konoe Yasuko (近衛安己君, 1704 – 1725), Wife of Tokugawa Tsugutomo (徳川継友), fourth daughter
- Unknown concubine
  - Takara (宝演, 1714 – 1733), third son
  - Shin-sei (信性, 1723 – 1787), fourth son
  - Takatsukasa Hisasuke (鷹司 尚輔, 1726 – 19 April 1733), fifth son
  - Masahime (政姫, 1699 – 1704), Adopted by Tokugawa Ienobu, second daughter
  - Lady Fusako (房子), fifth daughter
