= Konoe Hisatsugu =

Japanese court noble

Konoe Hisatsugu (近衛 尚嗣; 1622 – 1653), son of regent Nobuhiro, was a kugyō or Japanese court noble of the Edo period (1603–1868). He held a regent position kampaku from 1651 to 1653.

There are no records of his mother. His sister was the consort of Tokugawa Mitsukuni, the daimyō of Mito Domain. As a son of Nobuhiro, he was the grandson of Emperor Go-Yōzei. His consort was Second Princess (Onna-ni-no-miya), the third daughter of Emperor Go-Mizunoo, thus a cousin of Hisatsugu. With her he had a daughter who was the consort of Fushimi-no-miya Prince Sadayuki (伏見宮貞致親王). With a servant he had a son, Motohiro.

== Family ==
Parents

- Father: Konoe Nobuhiro (近衛 信尋, 24 June 1599– 15 November 1649)
- Mother: Court lady (家女房)

Consorts and issues:

- Wife: Second Princess (女二宮, Onna-ni-no-miya, 1625–1651), daughter of Emperor Go-Mizunoo
  - Lady Yoshikun (好君), Wife of Prince Sadayuki, first daughter
- Wife: Lady Yorin-in (瑤林院), a court lady
  - Konoe Motohiro (近衛 基熈, 28 April 1648 – 13 October 1722), first son
