= Konoe Tsunehiro =

Konoe Tsunehiro (近衛 経熙; 1761–1799), son of regent Uchisaki, was a kugyō or Japanese court noble of the Edo period (1603–1868). He did not hold regent positions kampaku and sessho. Konoe Motosaki was his son. He also adopted a daughter of Satsuma Shigehide, the eighth head of Satsuma Domain, who later became a consort of shōgun Tokugawa Ienari.
