= Five regent houses =

Collective term for the five regent families of the Fujiwara clan

The Five Regent Houses (五摂家; go-sekke) is a collective term for the five families of the Fujiwara clan that monopolized the regent position of Sekkan in Japan from 1252 until 1868. The five houses are Konoe, Takatsukasa, Kujō, Ichijō, and Nijō, which were established during the split of the Fujiwara Hokke. After the abolition of the regency in 1868, the Five Regent Houses were all appointed Duke under the new hereditary peerage.

== Overview ==
Out of the four houses of the Fujiwara clan, the Fujiwara Hokke monopolized the regent position of Sekkan. In the Kamakura period, the Hokke split into the Five Regent Houses, Konoe, Takatsukasa, Kujō, Ichijō, and Nijō. These families continued to monopolize the regency from 1252 until the Meiji Restoration in 1868.

When the regency was abolished as part of the Meiji Restoration, a new hereditary peerage (kazoku) was established, and these houses were all appointed Prince.

The Fujiwara clan also had other families, but traditionally, only these five were eligible for regency. They were the most politically powerful families among the kuge (court nobility).

== See also ==
- Hokke (Fujiwara)
- List of Kuge families
- Japanese clans
