= Konoe Motosaki =

Konoe Motosaki (近衛 基前; 1783–1820)

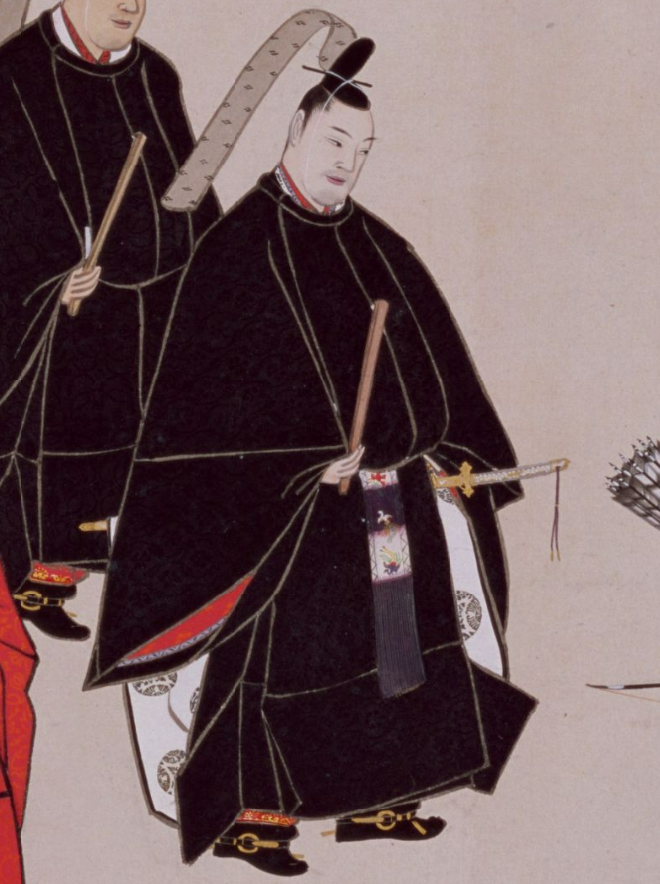

, son of Tsunehiro, was a kugyō or Japanese court noble of the Edo period (1603–1868). He did not hold regent positions kampaku and sessho. His consort was a daughter of Tokugawa Munechika, ninth head of Owari Domain; with her he had a son Konoe Tadahiro and a daughter who later became a consort of Tokugawa Nariharu, eleventh head of Owari Domain.
