= Fujiwara family tree =

Genealogical tree of the Fujiwara Clan

This is a genealogical tree of the leaders of the Fujiwara clan from 669 to 1871 of Japan, who were otherwise known as the Tōshi no Chōja (藤氏長者).

The title, Tōshi no Chōja, was abolished with Sesshō and Kampaku during the Meiji Restoration; the family leaders from five main branches of the clan, known as the Five regent houses, were then respectively granted with hereditary peerage titles (the kazoku) until the abolition of the nobility titles under the new constitution in 1946.

== Family Tree ==
Adoption	Imperial House (Note: During the Edo period, some of the former royal members from Imperial House of Japan were adopted as heir to the Five regent houses. Despite having a different patrilineal descent with that of the Fujiwara clan, they and their descendants were recognized as members from Fujiwara clan instead of the Imperial House. As such, these families are referred as "皇別摂家" in Japanese (Kōbetsu Sekke, "Imperial Regent Family").)	other family members
Nakatomi no Katanoko
Nakatomi no Mikeko	Nakatomi no Kuniko
(614-669); Fujiwara no Kamatari; 669	Nakatomi no Kunitari
(659-720); Fujiwara no Fuhito; 698-720	Tone no Iratsume	(?-711); Nakatomi no Omimaro; 669-698
(680-737); Fujiwara no Muchimaro; 737	(681-737); Fujiwara no Fusasaki; 720-737	(694-737); Fujiwara no Umakai
(704-766); Fujiwara no Toyonari; 737-757; 764-766	(706-764); Fujiwara no Nakamaro; 757-764	Fujiwara no Otomaro	(714-771); Fujiwara no Nagate; 766-771	(715-766); Fujiwara no Matate	(721-783); Fujiwara no Uona; 778-782	(723-776); Fujiwara no Kaedemaro	(716-777); Fujiwara no Yoshitsugu; 771-777	(722-783); Fujiwara no Tamaro; 782-793	(732-779); Fujiwara no Momokawa
(727-796); Fujiwara no Tsuginawa; 789-796	(727-789); Fujiwara no Korekimi; 783-789	(756-812); Fujiwara no Uchimaro; 796-812	(756-819); Fujiwara no Sonohito; 812-818	(774-843); Fujiwara no Otsugu; 826-843
(775-826); Fujiwara no Fuyutsugu; 818-826
(802-826); Fujiwara no Nagara	(804-872); Fujiwara no Yoshifusa; 826-872	(823-900); Fujiwara no Yoshiyo; 891-897
(836-891); Fujiwara no Mototsune; 872-891
(871-909); Fujiwara no Tokihira; 897-909	(880-949); Fujiwara no Tadahira; 909-949
900-970; Fujiwara no Saneyori; 949-970	909-960; Fujiwara no Morosuke
(924-989); Fujiwara no Yoritada; 972-974; 977-986	(924-972); Fujiwara no Koretada; 970-972	(925-977); Fujiwara no Kanemichi; 974-977	(929-990); Fujiwara no Kaneie; 986-990
(953-995); Fujiwara no Michitaka; 990-995	(961-995); Fujiwara no Michikane; 995	(966-1028); Fujiwara no Michinaga; 995-1017
(992-1074); Fujiwara no Yorimichi; 1017-1068	(996-1075); Fujiwara no Norimichi; 1068-1075
(1042-1101); Fujiwara no Morozane; 1075-1094
(1062-1099); Fujiwara no Moromichi; 1094-1098
(1075-1162); Fujiwara no Tadazane; 1098-1121
(1097-1164); Fujiwara no Tadamichi; 1121-1150; 1156-1158	(1120-1156); Fujiwara no Yorinaga; 1150-1156
Konoe; Family	Matsudono; Family	Kujō; Family
(1143-1166); Konoe Motozane; 1157-1166	(1144?-1231); Matsudono Motofusa; 1166-1179	(1149-1207); Kujō Kanezane; 1186-1196
(1160-1233); Konoe Motomichi; 1179-1183; 1184-1186; 1196-1202	(1172-1238); Matsudono Moroie; 1183-1184	(1169-1206); Kujō Yoshitsune; 1202-1206
(1179-1242); Konoe Iezane; 1206-1221; 1221-1228	(1193-1252); Kujō Michiie; 1221; 1228-1231; 1235-1237
Takatsukasa; Family	Nijō; Family	Ichijō; Family
(1210-1259); Konoe Kanetsune; 1237-1242; 1247-1252	(1228-1294); Takatsukasa Kanehira; 1252-1261; 1275-1287	(1211-1235); Kujō Norizane; 1231-1235	(1216-1271); Nijō Yoshizane; 1246-1247; 1265-1267	(1223-1284); Ichijō Sanetsune; 1242-1246; 1261-1265
(1246-1268); Konoe Motohira; 1267-1268	(1247-1313); Takatsukasa Mototada; 1268-1273	(1262-1301); Takatsukasa Kanetada; 1296-1299	(1229-1275); Kujō Tadaie; 1273-1274	(1254-1341); Nijō Morotada; 1287-1289	(1267-1334); Nijō Kanemoto; 1299-1305	(1248-1294); Ichijō Ietsune; 1274-1275
(1261-1296); Konoe Iemoto; 1289-1291; 1293-1296	(1275-1327); Takatsukasa Fuyuhira; 1308-1313; 1324-1327	(1305-1337); Takatsukasa Fuyunori; 1330-1333	(1248-1332); Kujō Tadanori; 1291-1293	(1287-1335); Nijō Michihira; 1316-1318; 1327-1330; 1333-1334	(1276-1305); Ichijō Uchisane
(1282-1324); Konoe Iehira; 1313-1315	(1287-1318); Konoe Tsunehira	(1311-1353); Takatsukasa Morohira; 1342-1346	(1273-1320); Kujō Moronori; 1305-1308	(1290-1327); Kujō Fusazane; 1323-1324	(1320-1388); Nijō Yoshimoto; 1346-1358; 1363-1367; 1382-1387; 1388	(1331-1400); Kujō Tsunenori; 1358-1361	(1291-1325); Ichijō Uchitsune; 1318-1325
(1302-1352); Konoe Tsunetada; 1320; 1334-1337	(1305-1354); Konoe Mototsugu; 1337-1338	(1331-1386); Takatsukasa Fuyumichi; 1367-1369	(1315-1349); Kujō Michinori; 1342	(1345-1382); Nijō Moroyoshi; 1369-1375	(1356-1400); Nijō Morotsugu; 1379-1382; 1388-1394; 1398-1399	(1358-1418); Ichijō Tsunetsugu; 1394-1398; 1399-1408; 1410-1418	(1345-1398); Kujō Tadamoto; 1375-1379	(1394-1449); Kujō Mitsuie; 1418-1424	(1317-1365); Ichijō Tsunemichi; 1338-1342
(1333-1387); Konoe Michitsugu; 1361-1363	(1331-1386); Takatsukasa Fuyuie	(1383-1411); Nijō Mitsumoto; 1409-1410	(1390-1445); Nijō Mochimoto; 1424-1432; 1432-1445	(1402-1481); Ichijō Kaneyoshi; 1432; 1447-1453; 1467-1470	(1440-1488); Kujō Masatada; 1487-1488	(1445-1516); Kujō Masamoto; 1476-1479
(1360-1388); Konoe Kanetsugu; 1387-1388	(1408-1472); Takatsukasa Fusahira; 1454-1455	(1416-1493); Nijō Mochimichi; 1455-1458; 1463-1467	(1423-1480); Ichijō Norifusa; 1458-1463	(1464-1514); Ichijō Fuyuyoshi; 1488-1493; 1497-1501	(1469-1530); Kujō Hisatsune; 1501-1513
(1383-1454); Konoe Tadatsugu; 1408-1409	(1445-1517); Takatsukasa Masahira; 1483-1487	(1443-1480); Nijō Masatsugu; 1470-1476	(1475-1539); Ichijō Fusaie	(1507-1594); Kujō Tanemichi; 1533-1534
(1402-1488); Konoe Fusatsugu; 1445-1447	(1480-1552); Takatsukasa Kanesuke; 1514-1518	(1471-1497); Nijō Hisamoto; 1497	(1509-1556); Ichijō Fusamichi; 1545-1548
(1444-1505); Konoe Masaie; 1479-1483	(1509-1546); Takatsukasa Tadafuyu; 1542-1545	(1496-1551); Nijō Tadafusa; 1518-1525; 1534-1536	(1529-1554); Ichijō Kanefuyu; 1553-1554	(1548-1611); Ichijo Uchimoto; 1581-1584
(1472-1544); Konoe Hisamichi; 1493-1497; 1513-1514	(1526-1579); Nijō Haruyoshi; 1548-1453
(1502-1566); Konoe Taneie; 1525-1533; 1536-1542	(1553-1636); Kujō Kanetaka; 1578-1581; 1600-1604	(1556-1619); Nijō Akizane; 1584-1585; 1615-1619	(1565-1658); Takatsukasa Nobufusa; 1606-1608
(1536-1612); Konoe Sakihisa; 1554-1568	(1586-1665); Kujō Yukiie; 1608-1612; 1619-1623	(1590-1621); Takatsukasa Nobuhisa; 1612-1615
(1565-1614); Konoe Nobutada; 1605-1606	(1575-1630); Konoe Sakiko	(1571-1617); Emperor Go-Yōzei	(1607-1666); Nijō Yasumichi; 1635-1647	(1609-1647); Kujō Michifusa; 1647	(1609-1668); Takatsukasa Norihira
(1596-1680); Emperor Go-Mizunoo	(1599-1649); Konoe Nobuhiro; 1623-1629	(1605-1672); Ichijō Akiyoshi; 1629-1647; 1647-1651	(1625-1682); Nijō Mitsuhira; 1653-1664	(1637-1700); Takatsukasa Fusasuke; 1664-1682	(1641-1677); Kujō Kaneharu
(1654-1732); Emperor Reigen	(1622-1653); Konoe Hisatsugu; 1623-1629	(1633-1707); Ichijō Norisuke	(1660-1725); Takatsukasa Kanehiro; 1703-1707	(1693-1751); Ichijō Kaneyoshi; 1737-1746	(1669-1730); Kujō Suketsugu; 1711-1722	(1672-1732); Nijō Tsunahira; 1722-1726
(1675-1710); Emperor Higashiyama	(1648-1722); Konoe Motohiro; 1690-1703	(1652-1705); Ichijō Kaneteru; 1682-1690	(1722-1769); Ichijō Michika; 1746-1757	(1700-1728); Kujō Yukinori	(1717-1787); Kujō Naozane; 1778-1787	(1689-1737); Nijō Yoshitada; 1736-1737
(1704-1753); Naohito, Prince Kan'in	(1667-1736); Konoe Iehiro; 1707-1711	(1756-1795); Ichijō Teruyoshi; 1791-1795	(1727-1754); Nijō Munemoto
(1737-1813); Takatsukasa Sukehira; 1787-1791	(1687-1737); Konoe Iehisa; 1726-1736	(1774-1837); Ichijō Tadayoshi; 1814-1823	(1754-1826); Nijō Harutaka
(1761-1841); Takatsukasa Masahiro; 1795-1814	(1728-1785); Konoe Uchisaki; 1757-1778	(1788-1848); Nijō Narinobu	(1798-1871); Kujō Hisatada; 1856-1862
(1789-1868); Takatsukasa Masamichi; 1823-1856	(1761-1799); Konoe Tsunehiro	(1816-1878); Nijō Nariyuki; 1864-1867	(1839-1906); Kujō Michitaka; 1868-1871
(1807-1878); Takatsukasa Sukehiro; 1863	(1783-1820); Konoe Motosaki
(1808-1898); Konoe Tadahiro; 1862-1863

== See also ==
- Japanese imperial family tree
- Fujiwara clan
- Five regent houses
- List of Kuge families
