= Ichijō family =

Branch of the Fujiwara clan

Ichijō 一条
- Parent house: Kujō family (Fujiwara clan)
- Titles: Various
- Founder: Ichijō Sanetsune
- Founding year: 13th century
- Cadet branches: Daigo family Tosa-Ichijō clan

The Ichijō family (一条家, Ichijō-ke) was a Japanese aristocratic kin group. The Ichijō was a branch of the Fujiwara clan, founded by Kujō Michiie's son Ichijō Sanetsune and was one of the Five regent houses, from which the Sesshō and Kampaku were chosen.

== Genealogy ==
adoption
Kujō Michiie (1193-1252)
Nijō Yoshizane (1216-1271)	Sanetsune^{(1)} (1223-1284)
Nijō Kanemoto (1267-1334)	Ietsune^{(2)} (1248-1294)
Nijō Michihira (1287-1335)	Uchisane^{(3)} (1276-1305)
Nijō Yoshimoto (1320-1388)	Uchitsune^{(4)} (1291-1325)
Tsunemichi^{(5)} (1317-1365)
Tsunetsugu^{(7)} (1358-1418)	Fusatsune^{(6)} (1347-1366)
Kaneyoshi^{(8)} (1402-1481)
Norifusa^{(9)} (1423-1480)
Fusaie (1475-1539)	Fuyuyoshi^{(10)} (1464-1514)
Fusamichi^{(11)} (1509-1556)
Kanefuyu^{(12)} (1529-1554)	Uchimoto^{(13)} (1548-1611)	Emperor Go-Yōzei (1571-1617)
Akiyoshi^{(14)} (1605-1672)
Norisuke^{(15)} (1633-1707)	Daigo Fuyumoto (1648-1697)
Takatsukasa Fusasuke (1637-1700)	Kaneteru^{(16)} (1652-1705)	Daigo family
Kaneka^{(17)} (1693-1751)
Michika^{(18)} (1722-1769)	Takatsukasa Mototeru (1727-1743)	Daigo Kanezumi (1747-1758)
Teruyoshi^{(19)} (1756-1795)
Tadayoshi^{(20)} (1774-1837)	Saionji Sanetsugu (1778-1787)
Sanemichi^{(21)} (1788-1805)	Koga Takemichi (1815-1903)
Tadaka^{(22)} (1812-1863)
Daigo Tadaosa (1830-1900)	Saneyoshi^{(23)} (1835-1868)	Shijō Takauta (1828-1898)
Tadasada^{(24)} (1862-1882)	Yoshiko (1868-1899)	Saneteru^{(25)} (1866-1924)	Ōinomikado Morosaki (1853-1925)
Tsuneko (1885-1956)	Sanetaka^{(26)} (1880-1959)
Sanefumi^{(27)} (1917-1985)
Saneaki^{(28)} (b. 1945)
Sanetsuna (b. 1976)

=== Tosa-Ichijō clan ===
The Tosa-Ichijō clan (土佐一条氏), a cadet branch of the Ichijō family, was established during the chaos of Ōnin War. In 1475, Ichijō Norifusa, the 9th head of the family, fled from Kyoto to Tosa Province, where one of the fiefdoms the family held by the time; some descendants of Norifusa stayed in Tosa for generations. The family, however, eventually lost control of Tosa during the reign of Ichijō Kanesada since 1575.

The following is the list of the heads of the Tosa-Ichijō clan:

1. Norifusa (1423-1480)
2. Fusaie (1475-1539), second son of Norifusa
3. Fusafuyu (1498-1541), eldest son of Norifusa and brother of Fusamichi (11th head)
4. Fusamoto (1522-1549), son of Fusafuyu
5. Kanesada (1543-1585), son of Fusamoto
6. Tadamasa (d. c. 1580), son of Kanesada
7. Masachika (b. c. 1578), son of Tadamasa. His whereabouts was lost in record since 1600, after the fall of the Chōsokabe clan as a result of the Battle of Sekigahara.

In 1902, Ichijō Sanemoto (一条実基, 1901-1972), eldest son of Ichijō Saneteru (25th head of Ichijō) and his second wife, became a baron, in name of revival for the Tosa-Ichijō clan. Baron Ichijō Sanemoto later married a British woman, Tess Snare (1900-1982), in 1928.

=== Daigo family ===
The Daigo family (醍醐家, Daigo ke) was founded in 1679 by Ichijō Akiyoshi's second son Fuyumoto. The family name was given by Fuyumoto's cousin, Emperor Reigen.

Ichijō Akiyoshi (1605-1672)
Fuyumoto^{(1)} (1648-1697)
Fuyuhiro^{(2)} (1679-1756)	Tokudaiji Kintake (1678-1720)
Ichijō Kaneka (1693-1751)	Tsunetane^{(3)} (1717-1781)
Kanezumi^{(4)} (1747-1758)
Fuyuyoshi^{(5)} (1752-1772)
Teruhisa^{(6)} (1760-1801)
Teruhiro^{(7)(9)} (1791-1859)	Shijō Takaari (1792-1857)
Tadataru^{(8)} (1819-1820)	Tadaosa^{(10)(13)} (1830-1900)	Shijō Takauta (1828-1898)
Tadatsugu^{(11)} (1848-1896)	Tadayuki^{(12)} (1849-1899)	Ichijō Tadasada (1862-1882)	Ichijō Saneteru (1866-1924)
Kakutaro	Kenjiro	Tadashige^{(14)} (1891-1947)
Tadayoshi^{(15)} (1926-1977)
Tadahisa^{(16)} (b. 1928)
Tadanori^{(17)} (b. 1958)
Tadaaki (b. 1993)

== See also ==
- Japanese clans
- List of Kuge families
- Five Regent Houses
