= Nijō family =

Japanese aristocratic kin group

Nijō 二条
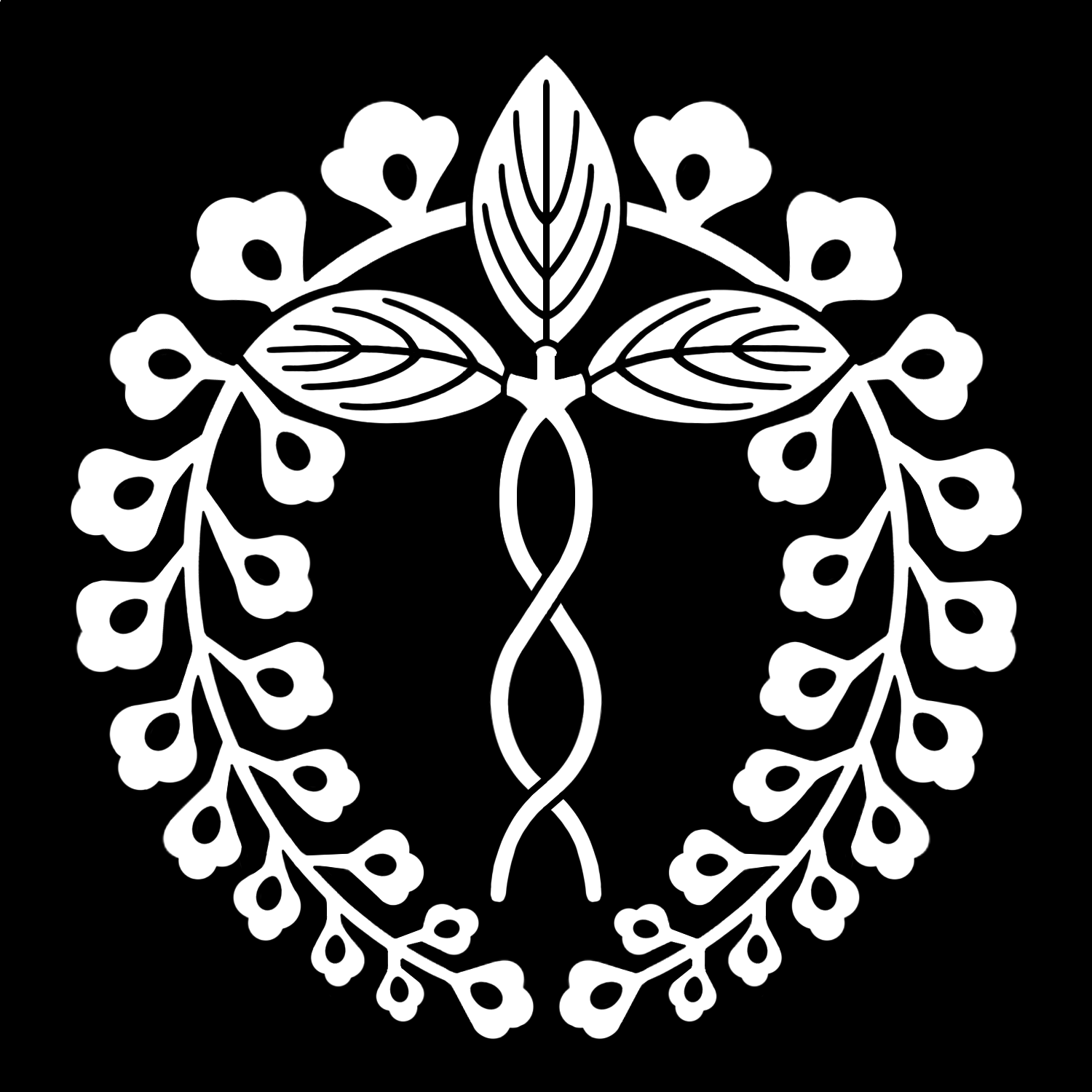
- Parent house: Kujō family (Fujiwara clan)
- Titles: Various
- Founder: Nijō Yoshizane
- Founding year: 13th century
- Dissolution: still extant
- Cadet branches: Matsuzono family

Nijō family (二条家, Nijō-ke) is a Japanese aristocratic kin group. The Nijō was a branch of the Fujiwara clan, founded by Kujō Michiie's son Nijō Yoshizane. The Nijō was one of the Five regent houses; from which, the Sesshō and Kampaku were chosen.

== History ==
The family name Nijō derived from Yoshizane's residence in Kyoto, where is believed to locate between two roads, the south of "Nijō-Ōji" (二条大路) and the east of "Higashi no Tōin-Ōji" (東洞院大路). As of the Muromachi and Edo period, Nijō family had a relative close relationship comparing with other four regent houses, and the leaders of the Nijō were given names (henki, 偏諱) from that of incumbent shōguns'. Nijō Nariyuki, the last Sesshō and Kampaku, regent from the Fujiwara clan, also came from this family.

In 1526, Tominokōji Sukenao (富小路資直, d. 1535) was promoted to the rank dōjō (堂上) of Kuge, and the ancestor of the Tominokōji family, Tominokōji Michinao (富小路道直), was claimed to be a son of Nijō Michihira.

== Family Tree ==
adoption
Kujō Michiie (1193-1252)
Yoshizane^{(1)} (1216-1271)
Morotada^{(2)} (1254-1341)
Kanemoto^{(3)} (1267-1334)
Michihira^{(4)} (1287-1335)
Yoshimoto^{(5)} (1320-1388)
Moroyoshi^{(6)} (1345-1382)	Morotsugu^{(7)} (1356-1400)
Mitsumoto^{(8)} (1383-1411)
Mochimoto^{(9)} (1390-1445)
Mochimichi^{(10)} (1416-1493)
Masatsugu^{(11)} (1443-1480)
Hisamoto^{(12)} (1471-1497)
Tadafusa^{(13)} (1496-1551)
Haruyoshi^{(14)} (1526-1579)
Kujō Kanetaka (1553-1636)	Akizane^{(15)} (1556-1619)	Takatsukasa Nobufusa (1565-1658)
Kujō Yukiie (1586-1665)	Takatsukasa Nobuhisa (1590-1621)
Yasumichi^{(16)} (1609-1647)	Takatsukasa Norihira (1609-1668)
Mitsuhira^{(17)} (1625-1682)	Kujō Kaneharu (1641-1677)
Kujō Sukezane (1669-1730)	Tsunahira^{(18)} (1672-1732)
Kujō Yukinori (1700-1728)	Yoshitada^{(19)} (1700-1728)
Munehira^{(20)} (1718-1738)
Munemoto^{(21)} (1727-1754)
Shigeyoshi^{(22)} (1751-1768)	Harutaka^{(23)} (1754-1826)
Narimichi^{(24)} (1781-1798)	Narinobu^{(25)} (1788–1847)	Kujō Hisatada (1798-1871)	Mastsuzono Ryū’on (1811-1875)
Nariyuki^{(26)} (1816–1878)	Matsuzono family
Motohiro^{(27)} (1859-1928)
Masamaro (1872-1929)	Atsumoto^{(28)} (1883-1927)
Tanemoto^{(29)} (1910-1985)
Motoyuki^{(30)} (b. 1944)
Takamoto (b. 1983)

=== Matsuzono family ===
The Matsuzono family (松園家, Matsuzono-ke) was founded by Ryū’on (隆温), the 19th son of Nijō Harutaka, and he was a Buddhist monk in Daijō-in from 1830 to 1868; during the Meiji era, Ryū’on took the family name Matsuzono as of 1869; he also adopted Hisayoshi, third son of his cousin Kujō Hisatada, as his heir.

Nijō Harutaka (1754-1826)
Kujō Hisatada (1798-1871)	Ryū’on^{(1)} (1811-1875)
Hisayoshi^{(2)} (1840-1903)	Takatsukasa Hiromichi (1855-1918)
Harutada^{(3)} (1881-1905)
Nobuatsu^{(4)} (1893-1941)	Matsudaira Norinaga (1868-1928)
Yanagisawa Kentaro	Norimitsu^{(5)} (b. 1923)
Hiroshi^{(6)} (b. 1923)	Noriko (b. 1931)

== See also ==
- Japanese clans
- List of Kuge families
- Five Regent Houses
