= Takatsukasa family =

Branch of the Fujiwara clan

Takatsukasa family 鷹司家
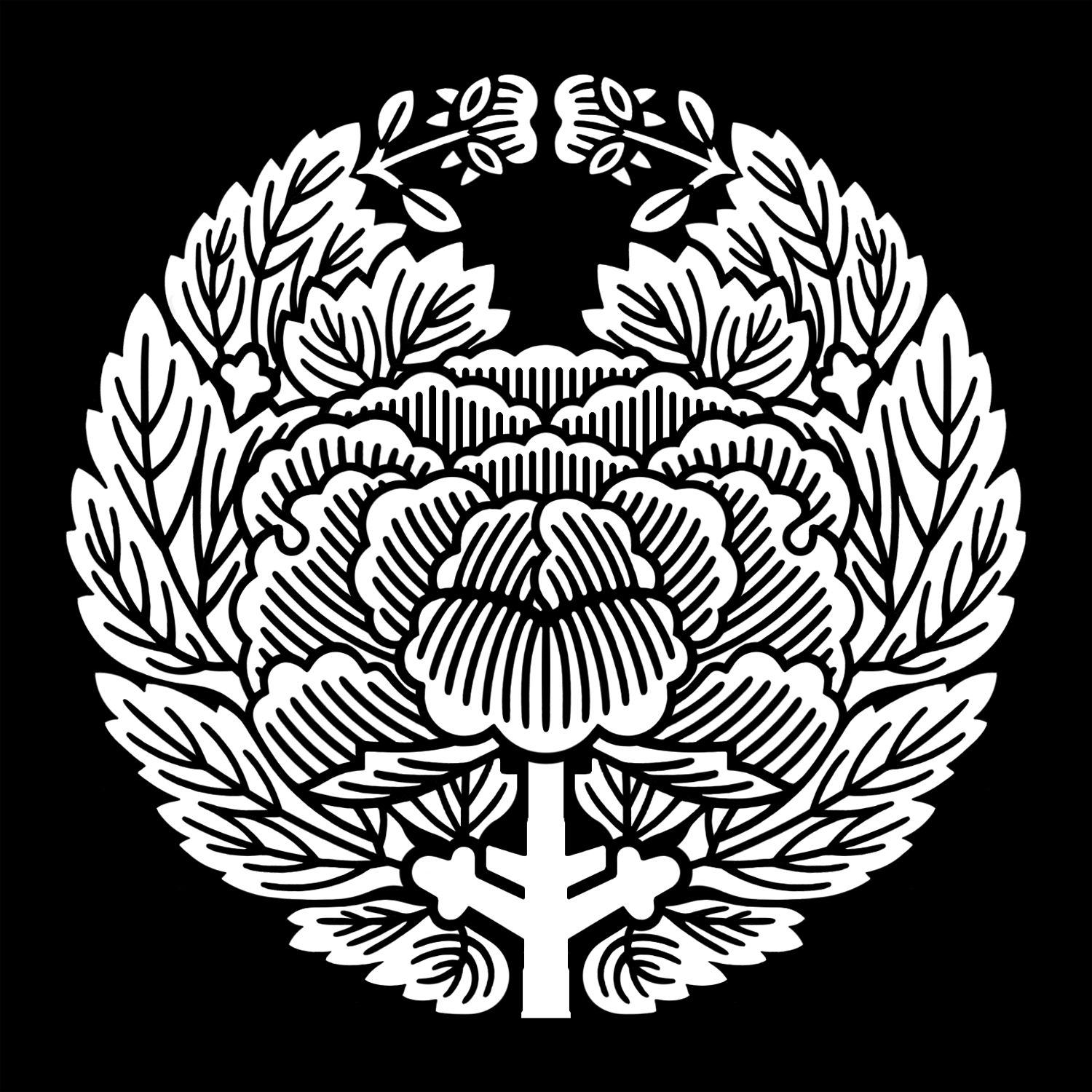
- Mon: Takatsukasa Botan
- Parent house: Konoe family (Fujiwara clan)
- Titles: Various
- Founder: Takatsukasa Kanehira
- Founding year: 13th century
- Dissolution: still extant
- Cadet branches: Yoshii family

The Takatsukasa family (鷹司家, Takatsukasa-ke) is a Japanese aristocratic kin group. The Takatsukasa was a branch of the Fujiwara clan and one of the Five regent houses, from which Sesshō and Kampaku could be chosen.

The family crest of Takatsukasa is peony.

== History ==
The Takatsukasa family was founded by Fujiwara no Kanehira (1228–1294), who was the sixth son of Konoe Iezane; he was also the first to take this family name, named after the section of Kyoto in which the household resided. The Takatsukasa family, for the first time, died out in the Sengoku period following the death of Tadafuyu, 13th head of the family, in 1546. Later in 1579, with the assistance of Oda Nobunaga, the third son of Nijō Haruyoshi took the name Takatsukasa Nobufusa and revived the household. Nobufusa's daughter Takako married Iemitsu, the third Tokugawa shōgun.

In 1884, Hiromichi, the head of the Takatsukasa family, became a prince in the kazoku system. In 1950, Princess Kazuko, the third daughter of Hirohito (the Emperor Showa) married Toshimichi Takatsukasa. The couple had no biological children and adopted Toshimichi's nephew Naotake.

== Family Tree ==
=== First Creation (1252-1546) ===
adoption
Konoe Iezane (1179-1243)
Kanehira^{(1)} (1228-1294)
Mototada^{(2)} (1247-1313)
Kanetada^{(3)} (1262-1301)
Fuyuhira^{(4)} (1275-1327)
Fuyunori^{(5)} (1295-1337)
Morohira^{(6)} (1310-1353)
Fuyumichi^{(7)} (1330-1386)
Fuyuie^{(8)} (1357-1425)
Fusahira^{(9)} (1408-1472)
Masahira^{(10)} (1445–1517)
Kanesuke^{(11)} (1480–1552)
Tadafuyu^{(12)} (1509-1546)

=== Second Creation (1579-present) ===
adoption
Nijō Haruyoshi (1526-1579)
Nobufusa^{(13)} (1565-1658)
Nobuhisa^{(14)} (1590-1621)	Matsudaira Nobuhira (1636-1689)
Norihira^{(15)} (1609-1668)	Takatsukasa-Matsudaira family
Fusasuke^{(16)} (1637-1700)	Kujō Kaneharu (1641-1677)
Konoe Iehiro (1667-1736)	Kanehiro^{(17)} (1659-1725)	Ichijō Kaneka (1693-1751)	Kujō Suketsugu (1669-1730)
Fusahiro^{(18)} (1710-1730)	Kujō Yukinori (1700-1728)	Emperor Higashiyama (1675-1710)
Hisasuke^{(19)} (1726-1733)	Mototeru^{(20)} (1727-1743)	Nijō Munemoto (1727-1754)	Prince Naohito (1704-1753)
Sukehira^{(21)} (1737-1813)
Nijō Harutaka (1754-1826)	Masahiro^{(22)} (1761-1841)
Masamichi^{(23)} (1789-1868)
Kujō Hisatada (1798-1871)	Sukehiro^{(24)} (1807-1878)
Hiromichi^{(25)} (1855-1918)
Nobusuke^{(26)} (1890–1959)
Toshimichi^{(27)} (1923-1966)	Fumiko Matsudaira (1924-2005)	Noritake Matsudaira (1919-1945)
Naotake^{(28)} (b. 1945)
Naomichi (b. 1974)

=== Takatsukasa-Matsudaira (Yoshii) family ===
The Takatsukasa-Matsudaira family (鷹司松平家, Takatsukasa-Matsudaira-ke) was a cadet branch of both Takatsukasa and the Kishū-Tokugawa family, founded by Matsudaira Nobuhira, the youngest son of Takatsukasa Nobufusa. Because of his sister's marriage to the shōgun Tokugawa Iemitsu since 1623, Nobuhira moved to Edo in 1650; Iemitsu welcomed his brother-in-law and granted him the rank hatamoto. Arranged by Iemitsu's successor Tokugawa Ietsuna, in 1653, Nobuhira married Matsuhime, the second daughter of Tokugawa Yorinobu; as a close relative of the Tokugawa clan, Nobuhira was later allowed to adopt the family name Matsudaira by the next year. During the era of Meiji, the family name was changed to Yoshii (吉井), named after the family's fief Yoshii Domain in Edo Period.

Yūki Hideyasu (1574-1607)	Tokugawa Yorinobu (1602-1671)	Takatsukasa Nobufusa (1565-1658)
Matsudaira Naomasa (1601-1666)	Matsudaira Yorizumi (1641-1711)	Matsuhime	Matsudaira Nobuhira^{(1)} (1636-1689)
Matsudaira Chikayoshi (1632-1717)	Matsudaira Nobumasa^{(2)} (1661-1691)
Matsudaira Chikatoki (1659-1702)	Tokugawa Munenao (1682-1757)	Matsudaira Nobukiyo^{(3)} (1689-1724)
Matsudaira Chikatomo (1681-1728)	Matsudaira Nobutomo^{(4)} (1712-1760)
Matsudaira Nagataka (1725-1762)	Matsudaira Nobuari^{(5)} (1739-1793)
Matsudaira Nobuakira^{(6)} (1745-1775)
Matsudaira Yasuchika (1752-1794)	Matsudaira Nobushige^{(7)} (1767-1800)
Matsudaira Nobumitsu^{(8)} (1775-1803)
Matsudaira Korekata	Matsudaira Nobuyoshi^{(9)} (1798-1841)	Matsudaira Fusakura
Satohime (1828-1835)	Matsudaira Nobutada^{(10)} (1826-1847)
Uesugi Narinori (1820-1889)	Matsudaira Nobuoki^{(11)} (1824-1890)	daughter
Yoshii Nobunori^{(12)} (1853-1908)
Yoshii Nobutomi^{(13)} (1876-1923)
Yoshii Nobuyasu^{(14)} (b. 1911)

== See also ==
- Japanese clans
- List of Kuge families
- Five Regent Houses
