= Kujō family =

Branch of the Fujiwara clan

Kujō 九条
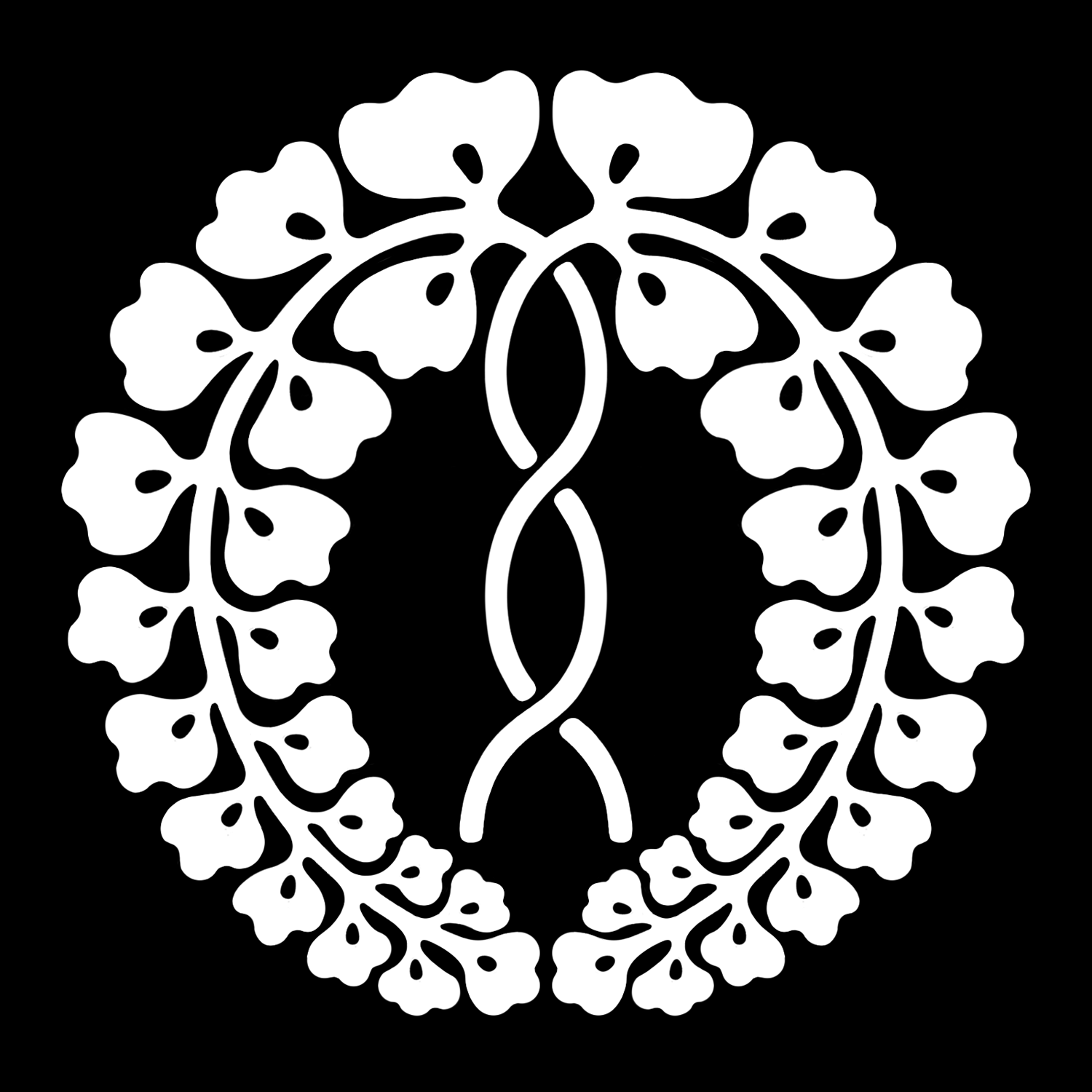
- The emblem (mon) of the Kujō clan
- Parent house: Fujiwara clan (Hokke)
- Titles: Various
- Founder: Kujō Michiie
- Founding year: 13th century
- Dissolution: extant
- Cadet branches: Nijō family; Ichijō family; Tsurudono family

Kujō family (Japanese: 九条家, Hepburn: Kujō-ke) is a Japanese aristocratic kin group. The family is a branch of Hokke and, by extension, a main branch of the Fujiwara clan.

== History ==
The family claims descent from Fujiwara no Kanezane, third son of Fujiwara no Tadamichi. After the fall of the Taira clan in 1185, Kanezane became Sesshō and Kampaku with the support from Minamoto no Yoritomo; Kanezane then founded a separate family in 1191, taking its name from their residence on the road "Kujō-Ōji" (九条大路), built by his ancestor, Fujiwara no Mototsune. Since then, the Kujō became one of the five Fujiwara families from which the Sesshō and Kampaku could be chosen, later known as the five regent houses. The fourth and fifth shōgun of the Kamakura shogunate, Kujō Yoritsune and Kujō Yoritsugu, came from this family as well.

After the Meiji Restoration, members of the Kujō family were given the title Prince.

== Family Tree ==
adoption
Fujiwara no Tadamichi (1097-1164)
Konoe family
Konoe Motozane (1143-1166)	Kanezane^{(1)} (1149-1207)
Yoshitsune^{(2)} (1169-1206)
Michiie^{(3)} (1193-1252)
Nijō family	Ichijō family
Norizane^{(4)} (1211-1235)	Nijō Yoshizane (1216-1271)	Ichijō Sanetsune (1223-1284)
Tadaie^{(5)} (1229-1275)
Tadanori^{(6)} (1248-1332)	Nijō Kanemoto (1267-1334)
Moronori^{(7)} (1273-1320)
Fusazane^{(8)} (1290-1327)	Nijō Michihira (1287-1335)
Michinori^{(9)} (1315-1349)	Nijō Yoshimoto (1320-1388)
Nijō Morotsugu (1356-1400)	Tsunenori^{(10)} (1331-1400)
Nijō Mochimoto (1390-1445)	Tadamoto^{(11)} (1345-1398)
Nijō Mochimichi (1416-1493)	Mitsuie^{(12)} (1394-1449)
Nijō Masatsugu (1443-1480)	Masatada^{(13)} (1440-1488)	Masamoto^{(14)} (1445-1516)
Nijō Hisamoto (1471-1497)	Hisatsune^{(15)} (1469-1530)
Nijō Tadafusa (1496-1551)	Tsuneko	Tanemichi^{(16)} (1507-1594)
Nijō Haruyoshi (1526-1579)
Kanetaka^{(17)} (1553-1636)	Takatsukasa Nobufusa (1565-1658)
Yukiie^{(18)} (1586-1665)	Takatsukasa Nobuhisa (1590-1621)
Michifusa^{(19)} (1609-1647)	Takatsukasa Norihira (1609-1668)
Tokihime (d. 1669)	Kaneharu^{(20)} (1641-1677)
Sukezane^{(21)} (1669-1730)
Morotaka^{(22)} (1688-1713)
Yukinori^{(23)} (1700-1728)
Tanemoto^{(24)} (1725-1743)	Nijō Munemoto (1727-1754)
Naozane^{(25)} (1717-1787)
Nijō Harutaka (1754-1826)	Michisaki^{(26)} (1746–1770)
Sukeie^{(27)} (1769–1785)
Suketsugu^{(28)} (1784–1807)
Hisatada^{(29)} (1798-1871)	Takatsukasa Masamichi (1789-1868)
Yukitsune^{(30)} (1823-1859)
Michitaka^{(31)} (1839-1906)	Matsuzono Hisayoshi (1840-1903)	Tsurudono Tadayoshi (1853-1895)
Michizane^{(32)} (1870-1933)	Tsurudono family
Michihide^{(33)} (1895-1961)
Michihiro^{(34)} (1933-2017)
Michinari^{(35)} (b. 1968)

=== Tsurudono family ===
The Tsurudono family (鶴殿家, Tsurudono-ke) was founded by the fifth son of Kujō Hisatada, Tsurudono Tadayoshi (1853-1895), in 1888. The kanji used in the family name was originally "靏殿" but later changed to "鶴殿", both names are pronounced "Tsurudono".

1. Tsurudono Tadayoshi (1853-1895), becoming baron since December 18, 1889 until his death.
2. Tsurudono Iekatsu (1891-1956), son of Tadayoshi, succeeding baron, after his father's death, in 1895–1947.
3. Tsurudono Sumiie (b. 1924), son of Iekatsu, and he has three sons.

== See also ==
- Japanese clans
- List of Kuge families
- Five regent houses
