= Kanesuke =

Kanesuke is a masculine Japanese given name, meaning "Preserver of health and strength."

Notable people with the name include:

- Kanesuke Hara (原 摂祐, 1885–1962), Japanese botanist
- Fujiwara no Kanesuke (藤原 兼輔, 877–933), Japanese middle Heian waka poet
- Takatsukasa Kanesuke(鷹司 兼輔, 1480–1552), Japanese court noble of the late Muromachi period
