= Tadamasa =

- Gender: Male

Origin
- Origin: Japanese
- Meaning: Different meanings depending on the kanji used

Tadamasa (written: 忠政, 忠正, 忠雅, 忠昌, 忠方, 忠誠 or 内政) is a masculine Japanese given name. Notable people with the name include:

- Tadamasa Goto (後藤 忠政; born 1942), Japanese yakuza boss
- Tadamasa Hayashi (林 忠正; 1853–1906), Japanese art dealer
- Honda Tadamasa (本多 忠政; 1575–1631), Japanese daimyō
- Ichijō Tadamasa (一条 内政; 1560–1580), Japanese nobleman
- Tadamasa Kato (加藤 忠正; born 1944), Japanese rower
- Tadamasa Kodaira (小平 忠正; born 1942), Japanese politician
- Makino Tadamasa (牧野 忠雅; 1799–1858), Japanese daimyō
- Matsudaira Tadamasa (松平 忠昌; 1598–1645), Japanese daimyō
- Mizuno Tadamasa (水野 忠政; 1493–1543), Japanese samurai
- Ōkubo Tadamasa (大久保 忠方; 1692–1732), Japanese daimyō
- Okudaira Tadamasa (奥平 忠政; 1580–1614), Japanese daimyō
- Tadamasa Sato (佐藤 忠正; born 1941), Japanese sprint canoeist
- Suwa Tadamasa (諏訪 忠誠; 1821–1898), Japanese daimyō
- Toda Tadamasa (戸田 忠昌; 1632–1699), Japanese daimyō
- Torii Tadamasa (鳥居 忠政; 1567–1628), Japanese daimyō
