= Ichijō Fusamichi =

- Lord: Emperor Go-Kashiwabara (until 1526); Emperor Go-Nara (after 1526)
- Born: 1509
- Died: December 1, 1556 (aged 46–47)
- Issue: Ichijō Kanefuyu; Ichijō Kanesada (adopted); Ichijō Uchimoto
- Clan: Ichijō
- Father: Ichijō Fusaie (birth); Ichijō Fuyuyoshi (adoptive)

Ichijō Fusamichi (一条 房通; 1509 – December 1, 1556) was a Japanese court noble of the Muromachi period (1336–1573). The second son of the kampaku, Ichijō Fusaie, he was adopted by Ichijō Fuyuyoshi. Fusamichi was appointed to kampaku in 1545, an office which he held until 1548.

He married a daughter of his adopted father Fuyuyoshi, and with her had two sons: Kanefuyu and Uchimoto. They adopted Ichijo Fusamoto's son, Kanesada.

== Family ==
- Father: Ichijo Fusaie
- Foster Father: Ichijo Fuyuyoshi
- Wife: daughter of Ichijo Fuyuyoshi
- Children:
  - Ichijo Kanefuyu
  - Ichijo Uchimoto
- Adopted Son: Ichijo Kanesada

Preceded by Takatsukasa Tadafuyu	Kampaku; 1545-1548	Succeeded by Nijō Haruyoshi
