= Ichijō Kanefuyu =

Ichijō Kanefuyu (一条 兼冬; 1529 – March 14, 1554), son of regent Fusamichi with daughter of Ichijo Fuyuyoshi, was a kugyō or court noble of the Muromachi period (1336–1573) of Japan. He held a regent position kampaku from 1553 to 1554. He adopted his brother Uchimoto as his son.

His Dharma names were Goen Myōji (後円明寺) and Tengaku Gyōshun (天岳行春).
