= Daigo Fuyumoto =

Daigo Fuyumoto (醍醐 冬基; August 2, 1648 – August 30, 1697) was the son of regent Ichijō Akiyoshi. He was a Japanese kugyō (court noble) of the Edo period (1603–1868). He founded Daigo family as a branch of Ichijō family. He was the father of Daigo Fuyuhiro, his heir, and Tokudaiji Kintake (徳大寺公全), adopted by Tokudaiji family.
