= Takatsukasa Morohira =

Takatsukasa Morohira (鷹司 師平; 1310 – 1353), son of Fuyuhira, was kugyo or highest-ranking Japanese court noble of the Muromachi period (1336–1573). Fuyunori adopted him as a son.

Morohira held the office of kampaku from 1342 to 1346.

- 1342 (Kōei 1, 1st month): The kampaku Ichijō Tsunemichi lost his position; and Morohira took on this role.
- 1346 (Jōwa 2, 2nd month): Morohira was relieved of his duties as kampaku; and he was replaced by Nijō Yoshimoto.

== See also ==
- Fuyumichi, Morohira's son.
