= Ichijō Tadamasa =

Ichijō Tadamasa (一条 内政, 1557–1580), sometimes called Ichijō Uchimasa, lived during the Sengoku Period of the 16th century in Japan. His father Ichijo Kanesada went into exile in 1570. At some point between June 1573 and May 1575, Ichijō Tadamasa traveled to Tosa to meet with Chōsokabe Motochika head of the Chōsokabe clan. Tadamasa became governor of Tosa after marrying Motochika's daughter. Following his involvement in a plot against his father-in-law led by Hakawa Genba and others, he was exiled himself. His son Masachika was the last member of the Ichijō clan of Tosa.
