= Konoe Iehira =

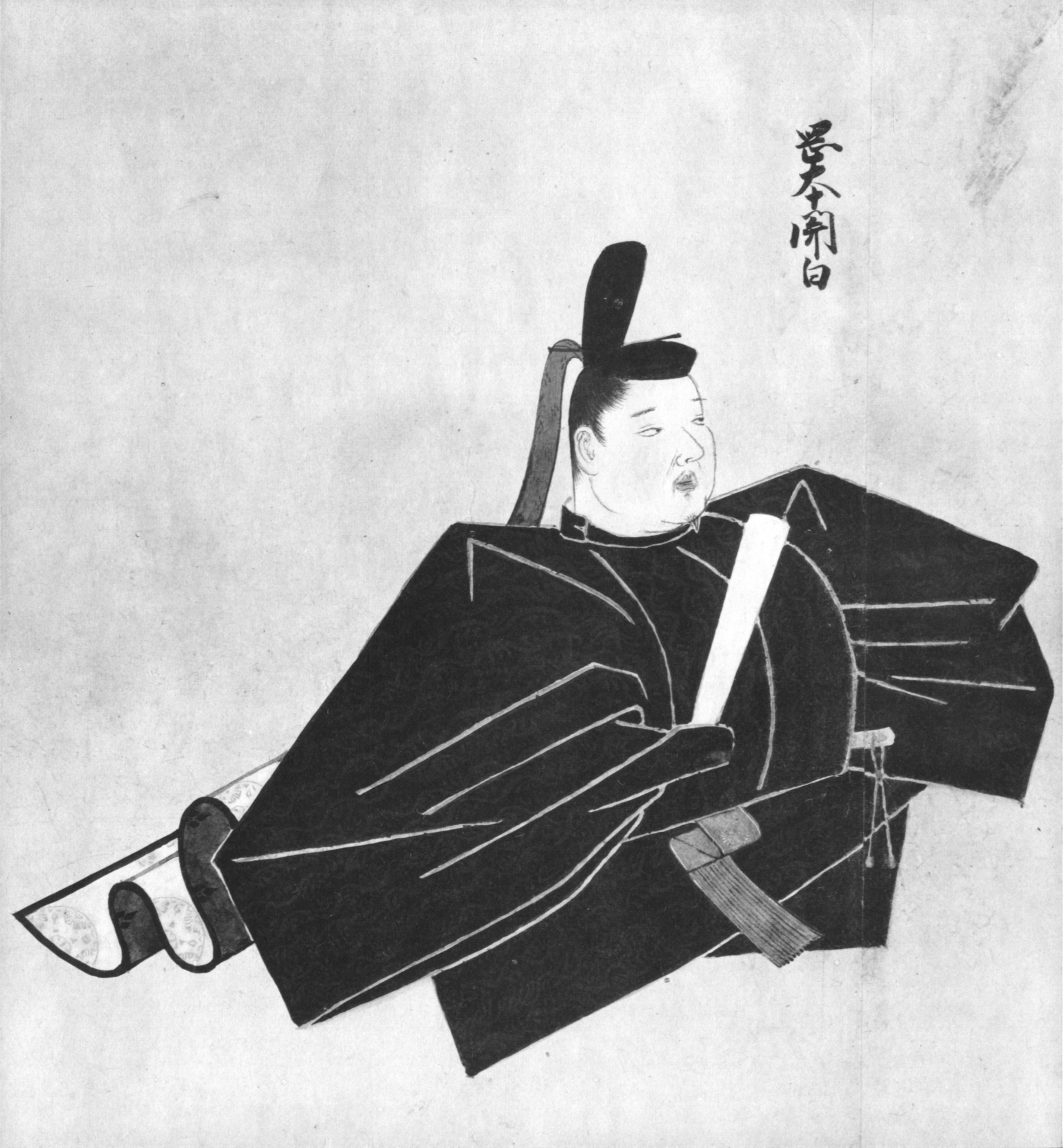
Konoe Iehira, was an interim ruler.

Konoe Iehira (近衛 家平; 1282 – 1324), son of Iemoto, was a kugyō or Japanese court noble of the Kamakura period (1185–1333). He held a regent position kampaku from 1313 and 1315. With a commoner he had a son Tsunetada.
