= Ichijō Akiyoshi =

Son of the emperor of Japan (1605–1672)

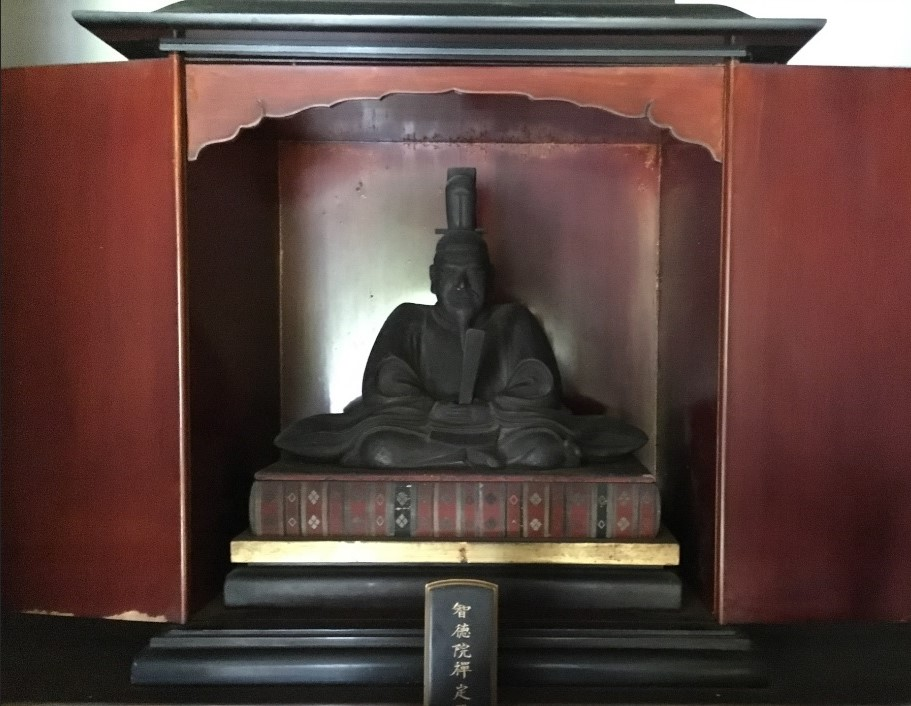
Statute of Ichijō Akiyoshi

Ichijō Akiyoshi (一条 昭良; June 12, 1605 – March 11, 1672), son of Emperor Go-Yōzei and adopted son of regent Uchimoto, was a kugyō (court noble) of the Edo period (1603–1868) of Japan. He held the regent positions of kampaku in 1629 and from 1647 to 1651, and sesshō from 1629 to 1635 and in 1647. He had sons Norisuke and Fuyumoto. Fuyumoto was later adopted by the Daigo family, a branch of the Ichijō family.

== Family ==
- Father: Emperor Go-Yozei
- Mother: Konoe Sakiko – Empress Dowager Chūwa (1575–1630)
- Foster Father: Ichijo Uchimoto
- Wives:
  - Daughter of Oda Yorinaga
  - Daughter of Nishinotoin Tokinao
- Children:
  - Ichijo Norisuke by Daughter of Nishinotoin Tokinao
  - Ichijo Fuyumoto by Daughter of Nishinotoin Tokinao
