= Konoe Hisamichi =

Japanese court noble

Konoe Hisamichi (近衛 尚通; 1472 – 1544) was a Japanese kugyō (court noble) of the Muromachi period (1336–1573). He held the regent position of kampaku from 1493 to 1497 and from 1513 to 1514.

== Family ==
He was the son of Konoe Masaie, and the father of Konoe Taneie. A daughter of his was a consort of samurai Hōjō Ujitsuna. Another daughter, later known as Keiju-in, was the wife of Ashikaga Yoshiharu and the mother of Ashikaga Yoshiteru and Ashikaga Yoshiaki.
