= Ichijō Fusaie =

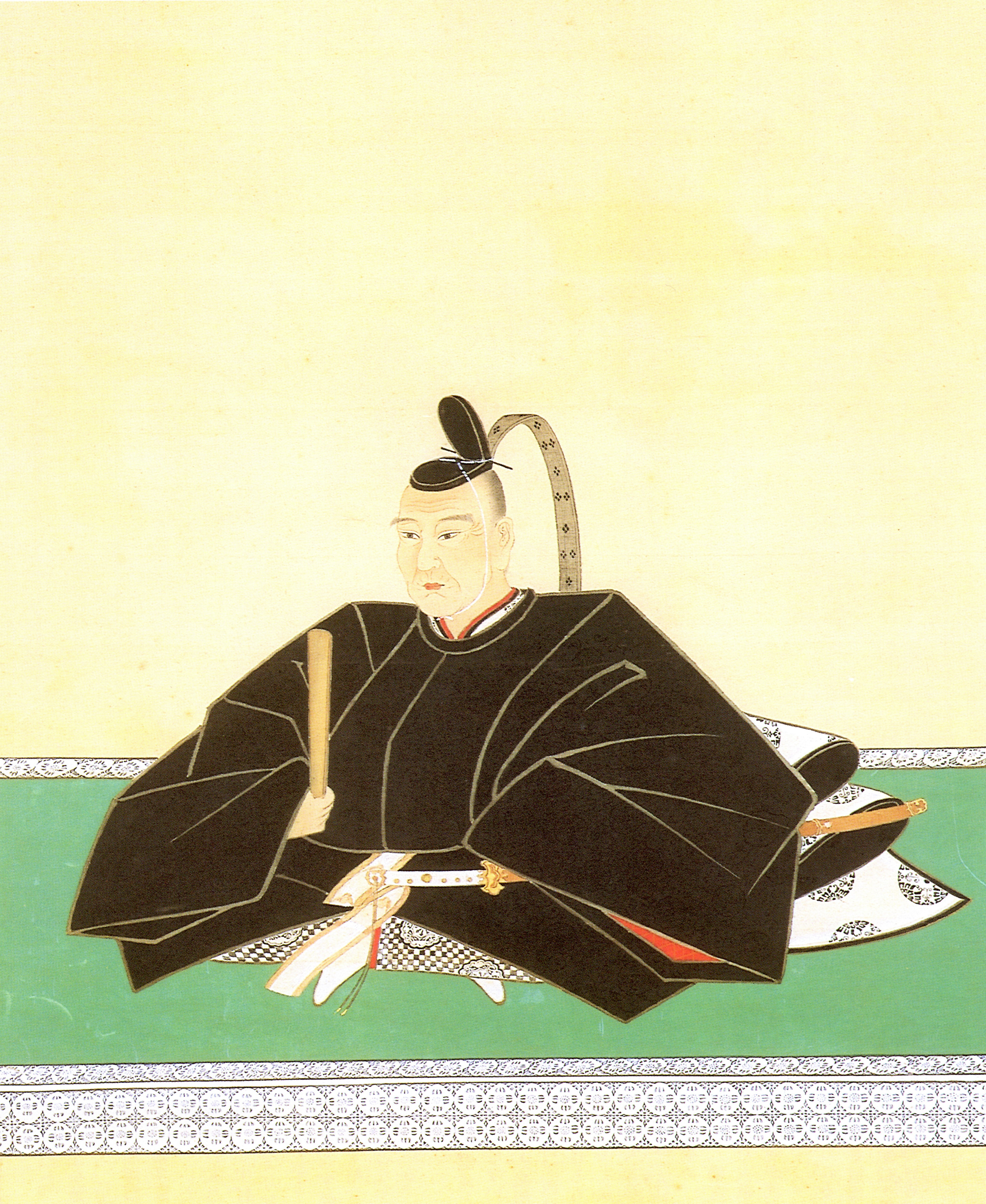
Ichijo Husaie

Ichijō Fusaie (一条 房家; 1475 – December 23, 1539), son of regent Norifusa, was a kugyō or Japanese court noble of the Muromachi period (1336–1573). He was the second head of Tosa-Ichijō clan. He was born when his father Norifusa was in exile in Tosa Province from Kyoto. He stayed in the province when his father returned to Kyoto. He was the father of Fusafuyu and Fusamichi.
