= Takatsukasa Fuyuie =

Takatsukasa Fuyuie (鷹司 冬家; 1367 – July 8, 1428), son of Fuyumichi, was kugyo or highest-ranking Japanese court noble of the Muromachi period (1336–1573). Unlike other members of the family, he did not hold a regent position kampaku. Regent Fusahira was his son.
