= Konoe Tsunetada =

Japanese court noble

Konoe Tsunetada (近衛 経忠; 1302–1352), son of Iehira, was a kugyō or Japanese court noble of the Kamakura period (1185–1333). He held a regent position kampaku in 1330 and from 1336 and 1337.
