= Konoe Kanetsune =

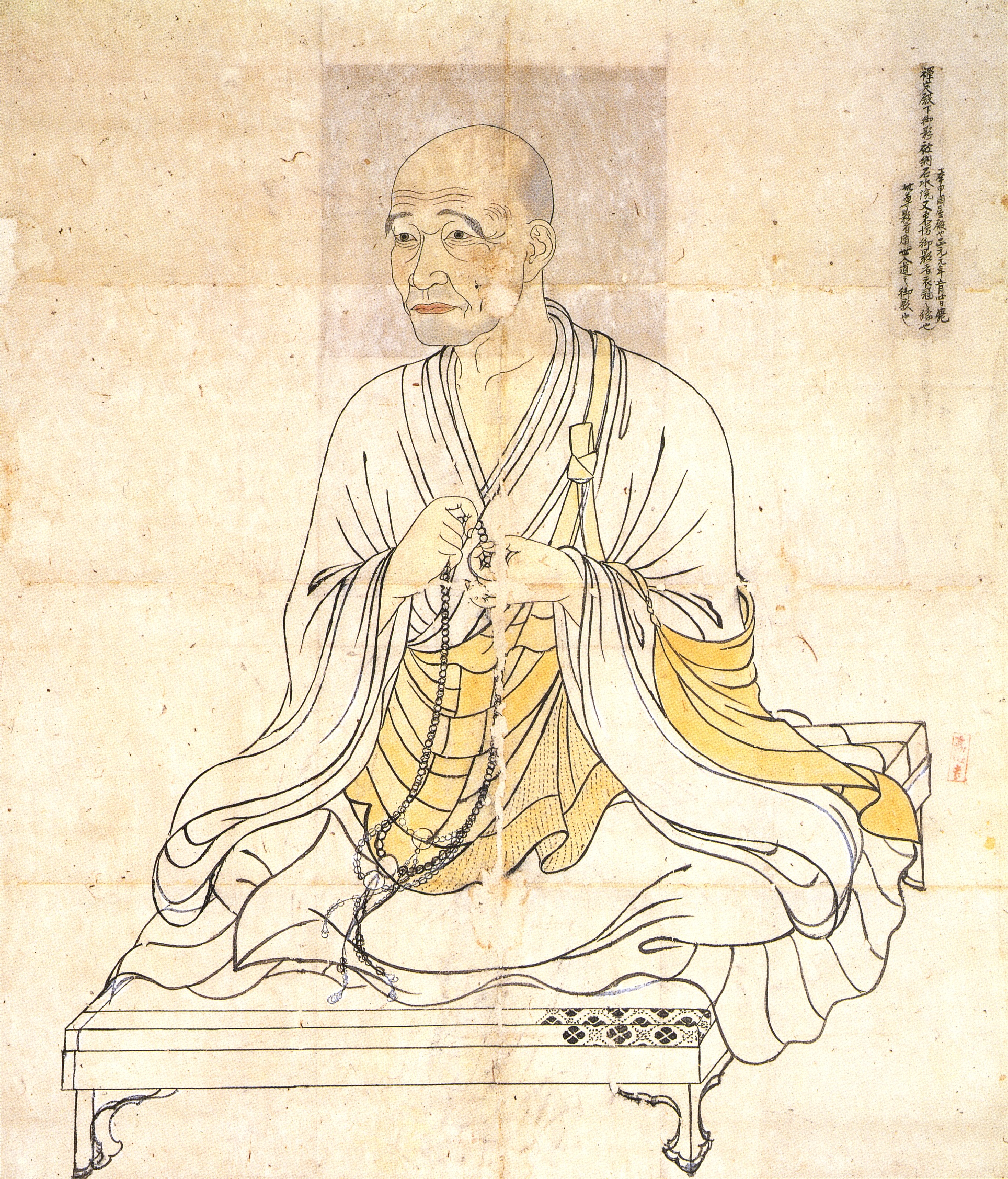
Portrait of Konoe Kanetsune

Konoe Kanetsune (近衛 兼経; 1210 – May 27, 1259), son of Iezane, was a Kugyō or Japanese court noble of the early Kamakura period. He held regent positions as follows:

- sesshō (1237–1242)
- kampaku (1242)
- sesshō (1247–1252)

With a daughter of Kujō Michiie he had a son Motohira.
