= Takatsukasa Tadafuyu =

Takatsukasa Tadafuyu (鷹司 忠冬; 1509 – 1546), son of Kanesuke, was a court noble (kugyo) of the late Muromachi period. He held a regent position Kampaku from 1542 to 1545. The succession of the household (Takatsukasa family) was halted after his death until Takatsukasa Nobufusa, adopted son of Tadafuyu, continued it.

Preceded by Konoe Taneie	Kampaku; 1542-1545	Succeeded by Ichijō Fusamichi
