= Ichijō Norifusa =

Ichijō Norifusa (一条 教房; 1423 – November 6, 1480)

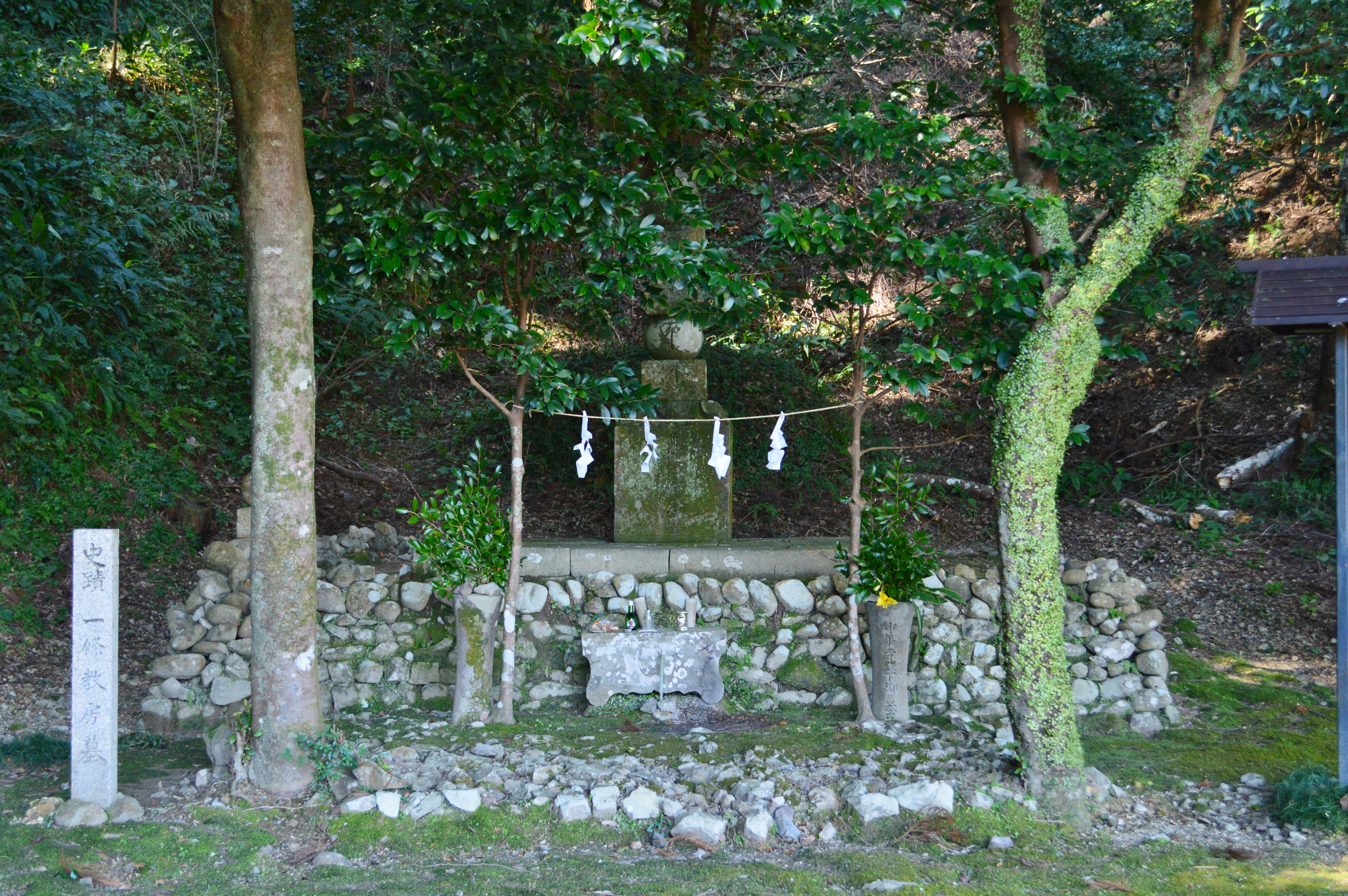
Tomb of Ichijō Norifusa

, son of regent Kaneyoshi, was a kugyō or Japanese court noble of the Muromachi period (1336–1573). He held a regent position kampaku from 1458 to 1463. In 1475, to escape unrest in Kyoto, he moved to Tosa Province, founding the Tosa-Ichijō clan. He eventually returned to Kyoto, but his son Fusaie stayed in the province.

== Family ==
- Father: Ichijo Kaneyoshi
- Mother: Nakamikado Nobutoshi's daughter (1405–1473)
- Wife: Shoji, daughter of Reisen Tameyuki
- Concubine: Daughter of Kagumi Munetaka
- Children:
  - Ichijo Masafusa (1443–1469)
  - Ichijo Fusaie by Daughter of Kagumi Munetaka
