= Konoe Taneie =

Japanese kugyō (1503–1556)

Konoe Taneie (近衛 稙家; 1503 – 1566)

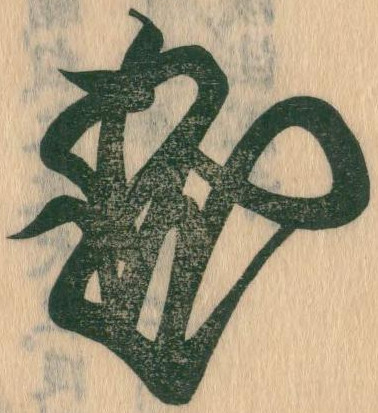
Konoe Taneie's signature

was a Japanese kugyō (court noble) of the late Muromachi period. He held the regent position of kampaku from 1525 to 1533 and from 1536 to 1542. He was the son of Konoe Hisamichi, and the father of Konoe Sakihisa. His daughter, Keifukuin Kaoku Gyokuei, wrote poetry and a commentary on The Tale of Genji. His other daughter was a consort of shogun Ashikaga Yoshiteru.

| Preceded by Nijō Tadafusa | Kampaku; 1525-1533 | Succeeded by Kujō Tanemichi |
| Preceded by Nijō Tadafusa | Kampaku; 1536-1542 | Succeeded by Takatsukasa Tadafuyu |
