= Kujō Michiie =

Japanese regent in the 13th century

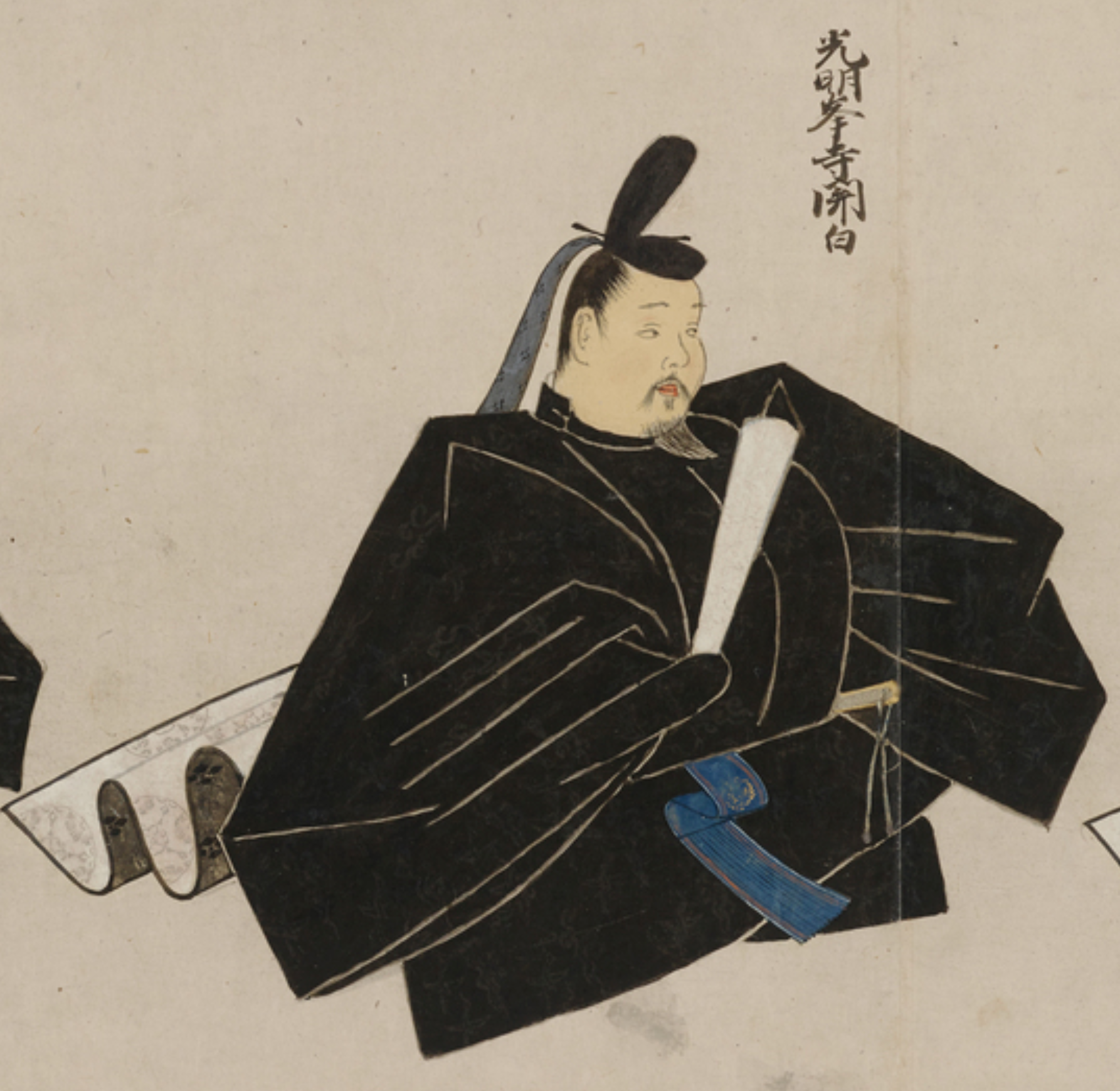
Kujō Michiie, Tenshi-Sekkan Miei

Kujō Michiie (九条 道家) (28 July 1193 — 1 April 1252) was a Japanese regent in the 13th century. He was the father of Kujō Yoritsune and grandson of Kujō Kanezane (also known as Fujiwara no Kanezane). He was the father of Norizane and Yoritsune. His third son Ichijō Sanetsune was the founding father of the Ichijō family, while his second son Nijō Yoshizane founded the Nijō family.

The Kujō family were sponsors of the Kitano Shrine.

In 1219, Kujō Michiie offered an emakimono named "Kitano Tenjin Engi Emaki" (Illustrated Scroll of the History of the Kitano Shrine) to the Kitano shrine. He gave an enlarged version of the scroll to the Kitano shrine in 1223.

In 1226, Michiie managed to have his son Yoritsune appointed fourth shōgun of the Kamakura shogunate.

In 1238, he was ordained as a Buddhist monk.

== Family ==
- Father: Kujō Yoshitsune
- Mother: Ichijō Yoshiyasu's daughter
- Wife and Children:
  - Wife: Sainonji Rinshi (1192-1251)
    - Kujō Norizane
    - Nijō Yoshizane
    - Kujō Yoritsune
    - Ichijō Sanetsune
    - Enjitsu (?-1272)
    - Jigen (?-1255)
    - Hōjo (1227-1284)
    - Kujō Shunshi married Emperor Go-Horikawa
    - Kujo Jinshi married Konoe Kanetsune
    - Shijo Emperor's wet-nurse
  - Wife: Minamoto no Arimasa's daughter
    - ??? (深忠)
  - Wife: Minamoto no Shigemichi
    - Jitsu (1238?-1300?)
  - Unknown
    - ??? (行昭;1231?-1303)
    - ??? (道智)
    - ??? (道意)
    - Shoshin (1236?-1287)
