= Ichijō Uchitsune =

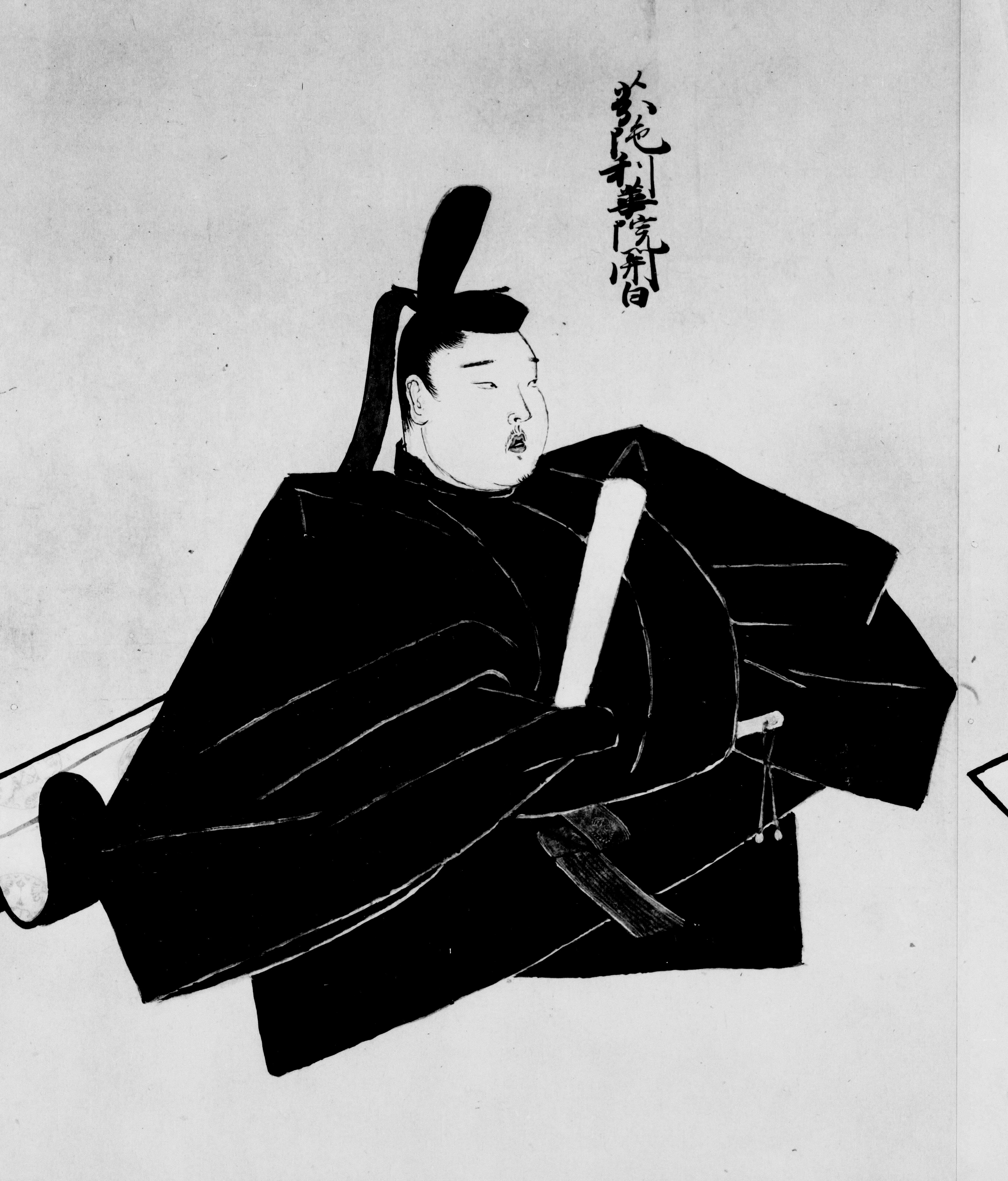

Ichijō Uchitsune (一条 内経; August 12, 1291 – November 7, 1325), son of Uchisane, was a kugyō or Japanese court noble of the Kamakura period (1185–1333). He held a regent position kampaku from 1318 to 1323. Tsunemichi was his son.

== Family ==
- Father: Ichijo Uchisane
- Mother: daughter of Ichijo Sanetsune
- Wife: daughter of Saionji Kin’aki
- Son: Ichijo Tsunemichi by daughter of Saionji Kin’aki
