= Takatsukasa Masahira =

Japanese court noble

Takatsukasa Masahira (鷹司 政平; 1445–1517), son of Fusahira, was a Japanese court noble (kugyo) of the Muromachi period. He held a regent position Kampaku from 1483-1487. Kanesuke was his son who he had with a daughter of Ichijō Kaneyoshi.
