= Nijō Moroyoshi =

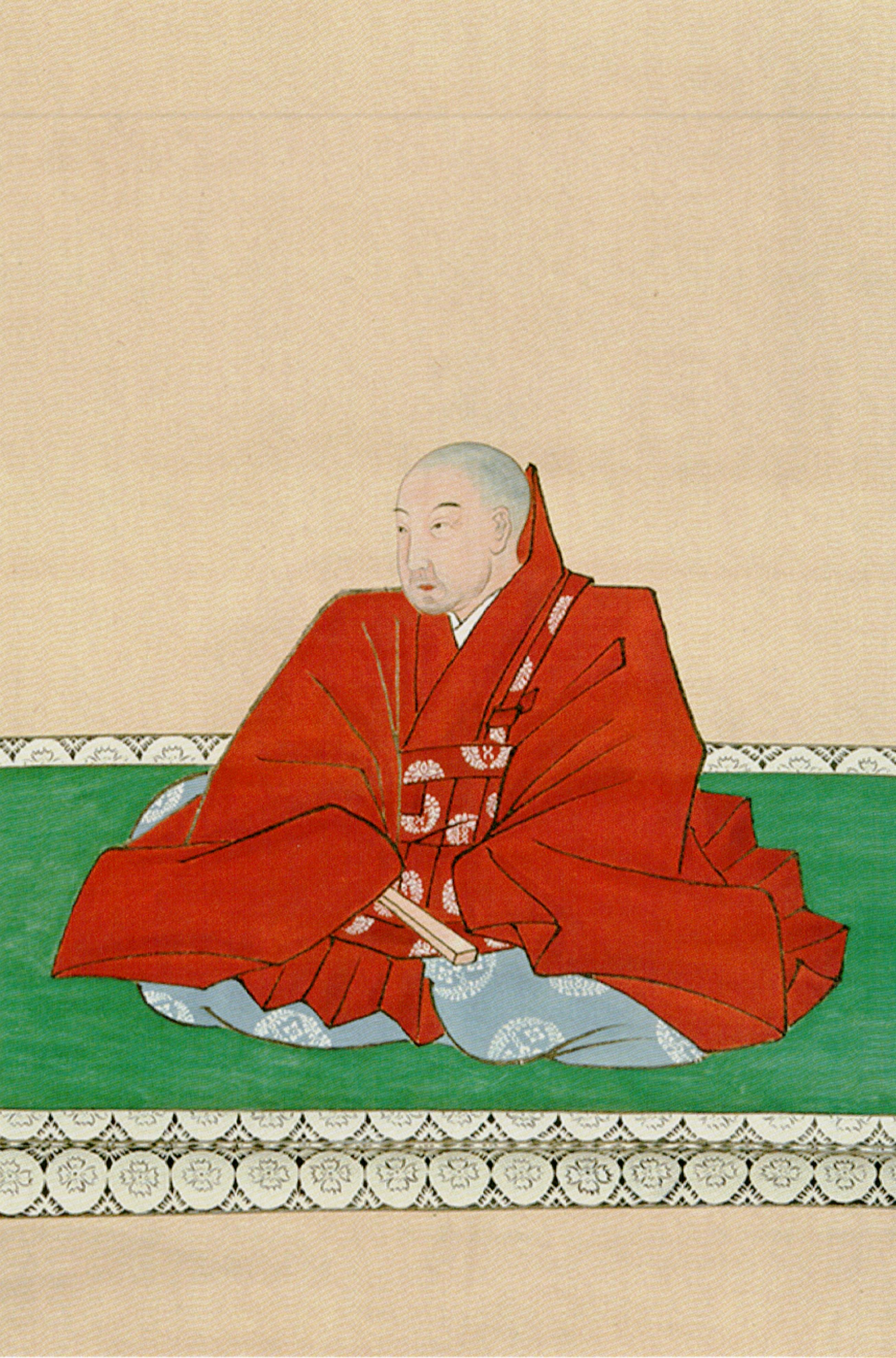

Nijō Moroyoshi (二条 師良; 1345–1382), son of regent Nijō Yoshimoto, was a Japanese kugyō (court noble) of the early Muromachi period (1336–1573). He held a regent position kampaku from 1369 to 1375. His wife gave birth to two sons; both were later adopted by his father Yoshimoto.
