= Nijō Yasumichi =

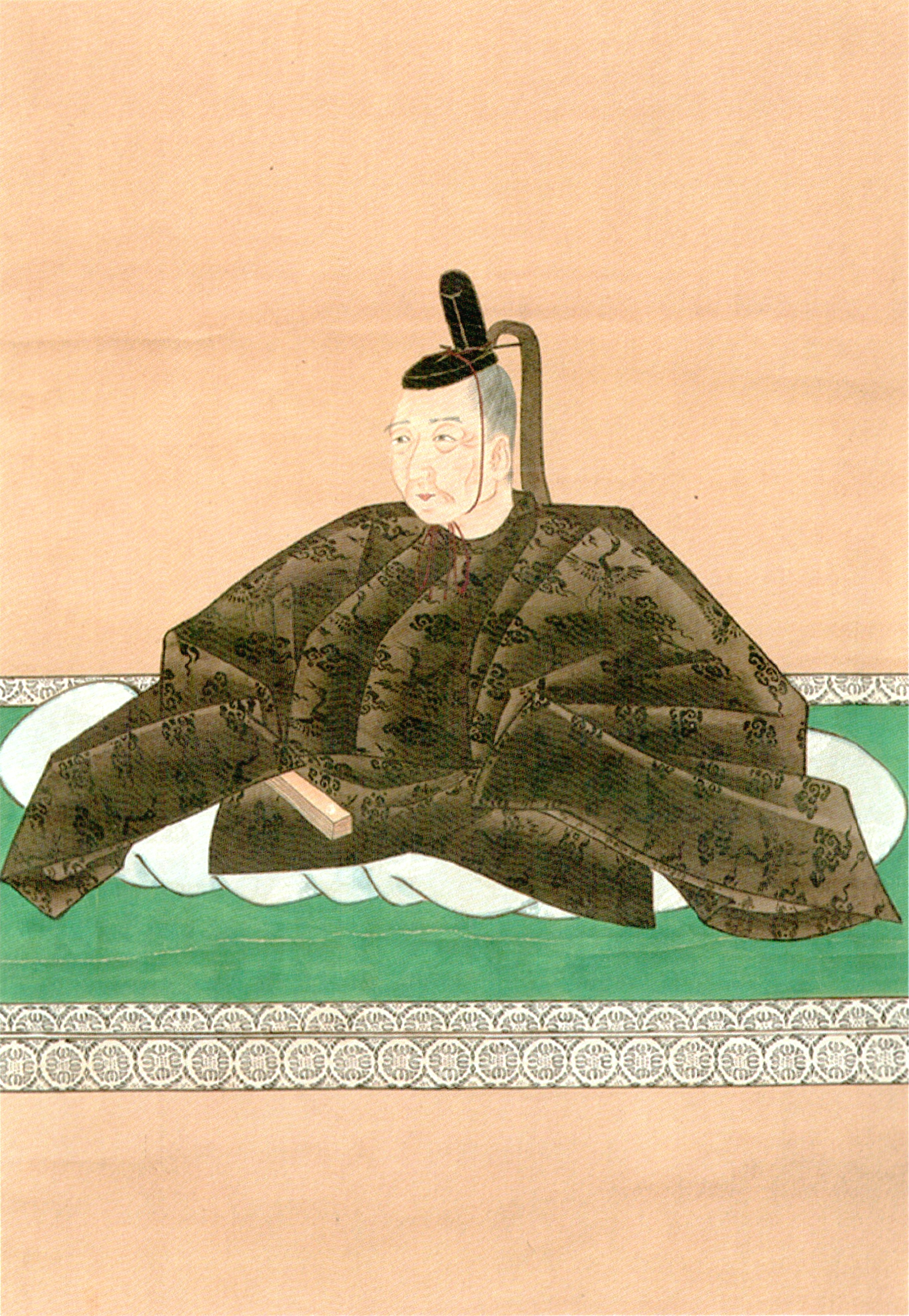

Nijō Yasumichi (二条 康道; 1607–1666), son of Kujō Yukiie and Toyotomi Sadako. He was also the adopted son of Nijō Akizane, was a Japanese kugyō (court noble) of the early Edo period. He held a regent position sesshō from 1635 to 1647. He married a daughter of Emperor Go-Yōzei, and the couple had son Nijō Mitsuhira.
