= Ichijō Kaneyoshi =

Ichijō Kaneyoshi (一条 兼良; June 7, 1402 – April 30, 1481), also known as Ichijō Kanera, was the son of regent Tsunetsugu. He was a kugyō or Japanese court noble of the Muromachi period (1336–1573). He held regent positions sesshō in 1432, and kampaku from 1447 to 1453 and from 1467 to 1470. Norifusa and Fuyuyoshi were his sons. One of his daughters, Keishi (経子), married Takatsukasa Masahira.

Before the Ōnin War, he "enjoyed universal respect for his scholarship, had a large and distinguished family, and owned perhaps the finest library of the time". Kaneyoshi fled to Nara, where his son was the abbot of the Kofuku-ji monastery. He remained there for ten years before returning to the capital.

In 1478 (Bunmei 10), Kanera published Bummei ittō-ki (On the Unity of Knowledge and Culture) which deals with political ethics and six points about the duties of a prince.

== Family ==
- Father: Ichijō Tsunetsugu
- Mother: Hisashiboji Hidenaga's daughter
- Wives
  - Nakamikado Nobutoshi's daughter (1405–1473)
  - Servant (name unknown)
  - Minamoto Yasutoshi's daughter
  - Minami no Kata (1443-1490)
- Children:
  - Ichijō Norifusa by Nakamikado Nobutoshi's daughter
  - Ichijō Fuyuyoshi by Minami no Kata
  - Ichijō Keishi married Takatsukasa Masahira by Minamoto Yasutoshi's daughter
