= Ichijō Kanesada =

Ichijō Kanesada (一条 兼定, 1543 – July 27, 1585) was the succeeding ruling head over Ichijō family's Tosa Province, throughout the late Sengoku period of Feudal Japan.

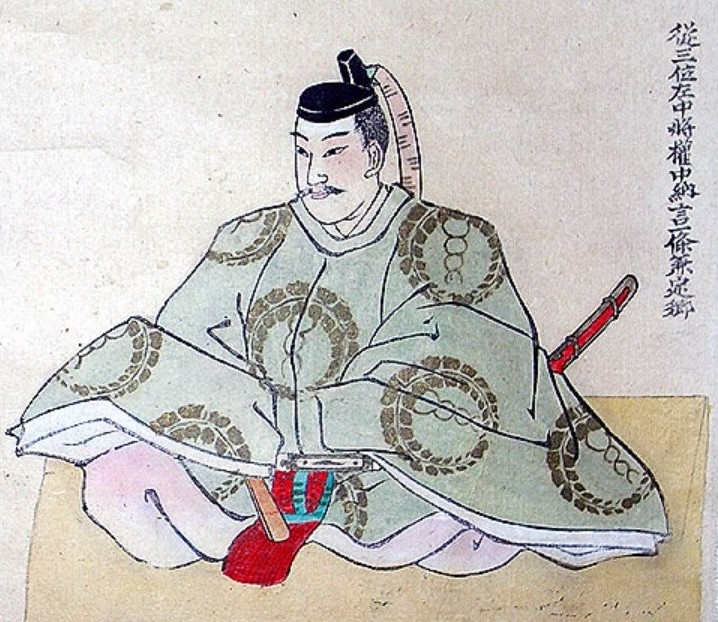
Ichijō Kanesada

He was a Christian and had the baptismal name of Don Paulo (ドン・パウロ, Don Pauro).
