= Ichijō Tsunetsugu =

Ichijō Tsunetsugu (一条 経嗣; 1358 – December 14, 1418), son of Nijō Yoshimoto and adopted son of regent Tsunemichi, was a kugyō or Japanese court noble of the Muromachi period (1336–1573). He held a regent position kampaku three times from 1394 to 1398, from 1399 to 1408, and from 1410 to 1418. He married a daughter of Takatsukasa Fuyumichi, and the couple had a son named Ichijō Tsunesuke (一条 経輔; ?-?). His other wife gave birth to Kaneyoshi.

== Family ==
- Foster Father: Ichijo Tsunemichi
- Father: Nijo Yoshimoto
- Wives:
  - Takatsukasa Fuyumichi‘s daughter
  - Hisashiboji Hidenaga’s daughter
  - Sono Motosada’s daughter
  - Servant (name unknown)
- Children:
  - Ichijo Tsunesuke (1392-?) by Takatsukasa Fuyumichi‘s daughter
  - Ichijo Kaneyoshi by Hisashiboji Hidenaga’s daughter
  - Yugen by Hisashibojo Hidenaga’s daughter
  - Zosai by Hisashibojo Hidenaga’s daughter
  - Unsho Ikkei (1386-1463) by Sono Motosada’s daughter
  - Gingen (d.1441) by Servant
  - Zoshi (d.1460) by Servant
