= Takatsukasa Fuyuhira =

Takatsukasa Fuyuhira (鷹司 冬平; 1275 – 1327), son of Kanetada and adopted son of Mototada, was kugyo or highest-ranking Japanese court noble of the Kamakura period (1185–1333). Morohira was his son. Fuyunori was his adopted son. He held court positions as follows:

- Sessho (1308–1311)
- Daijō Daijin (1310–1311)
- Kampaku (1311–1313)
- Kampaku (1315–1316)
- Daijō Daijin 1323-1327
- Kampaku (1324–1327)

== See also ==
- Kasuga Gongen Genki E
