= Sesshō and Kampaku =

Types of regent in Japan

Imperial Standard of the Regent

In Japan, the Sesshō (摂政) was a regent who was named to act on behalf of either a child emperor before his coming of age, or an empress regnant. The Kampaku (関白) was theoretically a sort of chief advisor for the Emperor, but was in practice the title of both first secretary and regent who assisted an adult emperor. The duties of the Sesshō and Kampaku were to convey to the Emperor the policies formulated by the Sadaijin (左大臣, Minister of the Left) and other senior officials of the Daijō-kan (太政官, Council of State), and to convey the Emperor's decisions to them. As regents of the Emperor, the Sesshō and Kampaku sometimes made decisions on behalf of the Emperor, but their positions were not defined by law and they had no specific political authority. The two titles were collectively known as sekkan (摂関), and the families that exclusively held the titles were called sekkan-ke (sekkan family).

During the Heian period (794–1185), from the middle of the 9th century, the Fujiwara clan began to marry off their daughters to the Emperor and assume the positions of Sesshō and Kampaku, thereby excluding other clans from the political centre and increasing their political power. From the 10th century, the Fujiwara clan monopolized the Sesshō and Kampaku, and at the end of the 10th century, around the time of Fujiwara no Michinaga and Fujiwara no Yorimichi, the power of the Fujiwara clan reached its zenith. In the mid-11th century, Emperor Go-Sanjo ran his own government, and the next Emperor, Shirakawa, abdicated to become Cloistered Emperor, beginning the cloistered rule. From then on, the cloistered rule of Cloistered Emperor took root, and the de facto Fujiwara regime, which used the positions of Sesshō and Kampaku, was over, and the Sesshō and Kampaku lost their real political power and became mere names.

During the Kamakura period (1185–1333), when the warrior class seized power and the Kamakura shogunate was established, the Fujiwara were divided into Five regent houses (五摂家, Go-sekke): the Konoe, Kujō, Nijō, Ichijo, and Takatsukasa families. From then on, these five families served as Sesshō and Kampaku on a rotating basis.

Toyotomi Hideyoshi was the first person in history to become a Kampaku who was not a noble by birth; his nephew Toyotomi Hidetsugu also became a Kampaku. Hideyoshi obtained this title, the highest position in the aristocracy, by being adopted into the Konoe family and formally becoming an aristocrat. A retired Kampaku was called Taikō (太閤), which came to commonly refer to Toyotomi Hideyoshi.

Both sesshō and kampaku were styled as denka or tenga (殿下) in historical pronunciation; translated as "(Imperial) Highness", as were Imperial princes and princesses.

== History ==
In earlier times, only members of the Imperial Family could be appointed sesshō. The Kojiki reports that Emperor Ōjin was assisted by his mother, Empress Jingū, but it is doubtful if it is a historical fact. The first historical sesshō was Prince Shōtoku, who assisted Empress Suiko.

The Fujiwara clan was the primary holder of the kampaku and sesshō titles. More precisely, those titles were held by the Fujiwara Hokke (northern Fujiwara family) and its descendants, to which Fujiwara no Yoshifusa belonged.

In 858, Fujiwara no Yoshifusa became sesshō. He was the first sesshō not to be a member of the Imperial house. In 887, Fujiwara no Mototsune, the nephew and adopted son of Yoshifusa, was appointed to the newly created office of kampaku.

In the 12th century, there were five families among the descendants of Yorimichi called sekke: the Konoe family, Kujō family, Ichijō family, Takatsukasa family and Nijō family. Both the Konoe and Kujō families were descendants of Fujiwara no Yorimichi, through Fujiwara no Tadamichi. The other three families were derived from either the Konoe or Kujō families. Until the Meiji Restoration of 1868, those five families held those title exclusively with the two exceptions of Toyotomi Hideyoshi and his nephew Toyotomi Hidetsugu.

The offices and titles of sesshō and kampaku were abolished by the declaration of the Imperial Restoration in 1868 during the Meiji Restoration in order to reorganize the government structure. The office and title of sesshō was stipulated under the former Imperial Household Law in 1889 and also under the new Imperial Household Law in 1948. Under these laws, the officeholder of sesshō is restricted to a member of the Japanese Imperial family. Crown Prince Hirohito, before becoming Emperor Shōwa, was sesshō from 1921 to 1926 for the mentally disabled Emperor Taishō. He was called sesshō-no-miya (摂政宮, "the Prince-Regent").

The area of Taikō in Nagoya is named after the title, although it refers to Toyotomi Hideyoshi. The main street is Taikō-dōri, which is served by the subway Taiko-dori Station.

== List ==
The following is a list of sesshō and kampaku in the order of succession. The list is not exhaustive:

| Portrait | Name | Regent title | Tenure | Monarch |
|---|---|---|---|---|
| | Prince Shōtoku (574–622) | Sesshō | 593–622 | Empress Suiko |
| | Prince Naka no Ōe (626–672) | Sesshō | 655–661 | Empress Saimei |
| | Prince Kusakabe (662–689) | Sesshō | 681–686 | Emperor Tenmu |
| | Fujiwara no Yoshifusa (804–872) | Sesshō | 858–872 | Emperor Seiwa |
| | Fujiwara no Mototsune (836–891) | Sesshō | 872–880 | Emperor Seiwa |
| | Fujiwara no Mototsune (836–891) | Sesshō | 872–880 | Emperor Yōzei |
| | Fujiwara no Mototsune (836–891) | Kampaku | 887–890 | Emperor Yōzei |
| | Fujiwara no Mototsune (836–891) | Kampaku | 887–890 | Emperor Kōkō |
| | Fujiwara no Mototsune (836–891) | Kampaku | 887–890 | Emperor Uda |
| | Fujiwara no Tokihira (871–909) | Sesshō | 909 | Emperor Daigo |
| | Fujiwara no Tadahira (880–949) | Sesshō | 930–941 | Emperor Suzaku |
| | Fujiwara no Tadahira (880–949) | Kampaku | 941–949 | Emperor Suzaku |
| | Fujiwara no Tadahira (880–949) | Kampaku | 941–949 | Emperor Murakami |
| | Fujiwara no Saneyori (900–970) | Kampaku | 967–969 | Emperor Reizei |
| | Fujiwara no Saneyori (900–970) | Sesshō | 969–970 | Emperor En'yū |
| | Fujiwara no Koretada (924–972) | Sesshō | 970–972 | Emperor En'yū |
| | Fujiwara no Kanemichi (925–977) | Kampaku | 972–977 | Emperor En'yū |
| | Fujiwara no Yoritada (924–989) | Kampaku | 977–986 | Emperor En'yū |
| | Fujiwara no Yoritada (924–989) | Kampaku | 977–986 | Emperor Kazan |
| | Fujiwara no Kaneie (929–990) | Sesshō | 986–990 | Emperor Ichijō |
| | Fujiwara no Kaneie (929–990) | Kampaku | 990 | Emperor Ichijō |
| | Fujiwara no Michitaka (953–995) | Kampaku | 990 | Emperor Ichijō |
| | Fujiwara no Michitaka (953–995) | Sesshō | 990–993 | Emperor Ichijō |
| | Fujiwara no Michitaka (953–995) | Kampaku | 993–995 | Emperor Ichijō |
| | Fujiwara no Michikane (961–995) | Kampaku | 995 | Emperor Ichijō |
| | Fujiwara no Michinaga (966–1028) | Sesshō | 1016–1017 | Emperor Go-Ichijō |
| | Fujiwara no Yorimichi (992–1074) | Sesshō | 1017–1019 | Emperor Go-Ichijō |
| | Fujiwara no Yorimichi (992–1074) | Kampaku | 1020–1068 | Emperor Go-Ichijō |
| | Fujiwara no Yorimichi (992–1074) | Kampaku | 1020–1068 | Emperor Go-Suzaku |
| | Fujiwara no Yorimichi (992–1074) | Kampaku | 1020–1068 | Emperor Go-Reizei |
| | Fujiwara no Norimichi (996–1075) | Kampaku | 1068–1075 | Emperor Go-Sanjō |
| | Fujiwara no Norimichi (996–1075) | Kampaku | 1068–1075 | Emperor Shirakawa |
| | Fujiwara no Morozane (1042–1101) | Kampaku | 1075–1086 | Emperor Shirakawa |
| | Fujiwara no Morozane (1042–1101) | Sesshō | 1086–1090 | Emperor Horikawa |
| | Fujiwara no Morozane (1042–1101) | Kampaku | 1090–1094 | Emperor Horikawa |
| | Fujiwara no Moromichi (1062–1099) | Kampaku | 1094–1099 | Emperor Horikawa |
| | Fujiwara no Tadazane (1078–1162) | Kampaku | 1105–1107 | Emperor Horikawa |
| | Fujiwara no Tadazane (1078–1162) | Sesshō | 1107–1113 | Emperor Toba |
| | Fujiwara no Tadazane (1078–1162) | Kampaku | 1113–1121 | Emperor Toba |
| | Fujiwara no Tadamichi (1097–1164) | Kampaku | 1121–1123 | Emperor Toba |
| | Fujiwara no Tadamichi (1097–1164) | Sesshō | 1123–1129 | Emperor Sutoku |
| | Fujiwara no Tadamichi (1097–1164) | Kampaku | 1129–1141 | Emperor Sutoku |
| | Fujiwara no Tadamichi (1097–1164) | Sesshō | 1141–1150 | Emperor Konoe |
| | Fujiwara no Tadamichi (1097–1164) | Kampaku | 1150–1158 | Emperor Konoe |
| | Fujiwara no Tadamichi (1097–1164) | Kampaku | 1150–1158 | Emperor Go-Shirakawa |
| | Konoe Motozane (1143–1166) | Kampaku | 1158–1165 | Emperor Nijō |
| | Konoe Motozane (1143–1166) | Sesshō | 1165–1166 | Emperor Rokujō |
| | Fujiwara no Motofusa (1144–1230) | Sesshō | 1166–1172 | Emperor Rokujō |
| | Fujiwara no Motofusa (1144–1230) | Sesshō | 1166–1172 | Emperor Takakura |
| | Fujiwara no Motofusa (1144–1230) | Kampaku | 1172–1179 | Emperor Takakura |
| | Konoe Motomichi (1160–1233) | Kampaku | 1179–1180 | Emperor Takakura |
| | Konoe Motomichi (1160–1233) | Sesshō | 1180–1183 | Emperor Antoku |
| | Matsudono Moroie (1172–1238) | Sesshō | 1183–1184 | Emperor Antoku |
| | Konoe Motomichi (1160–1233) | Sesshō | 1184–1186 | Emperor Antoku |
| | Konoe Motomichi (1160–1233) | Sesshō | 1184–1186 | Emperor Go-Toba |
| | Kujō Kanezane (1149–1207) | Sesshō | 1186–1191 | Emperor Go-Toba |
| | Kujō Kanezane (1149–1207) | Kampaku | 1191–1196 | Emperor Go-Toba |
| | Konoe Motomichi (1160–1233) | Kampaku | 1196–1198 | Emperor Tsuchimikado |
| | Konoe Motomichi (1160–1233) | Sesshō | 1198–1202 | Emperor Tsuchimikado |
| | Kujō Yoshitsune (1169–1206) | Sesshō | 1202–1206 | Emperor Tsuchimikado |
| | Konoe Iezane (1179–1243) | Sesshō | 1206 | Emperor Tsuchimikado |
| | Konoe Iezane (1179–1243) | Kampaku | 1206–1221 | Emperor Tsuchimikado |
| | Konoe Iezane (1179–1243) | Kampaku | 1206–1221 | Emperor Juntoku |
| | Kujō Michiie (1193–1252) | Sesshō | 1221 | Emperor Chūkyō |
| | Konoe Iezane (1179–1243) | Sesshō | 1221–1223 | Emperor Go-Horikawa |
| | Konoe Iezane (1179–1243) | Kampaku | 1223–1228 | Emperor Go-Horikawa |
| | Kujō Michiie (1193–1252) | Kampaku | 1228–1231 | Emperor Go-Horikawa |
| | Kujō Norizane (1210–1235) | Sesshō | 1231–1235 | Emperor Go-Horikawa |
| | Kujō Norizane (1210–1235) | Sesshō | 1231–1235 | Emperor Shijō |
| | Kujō Michiie (1193–1252) | Sesshō | 1235–1237 | Emperor Shijō |
| | Konoe Kanetsune (1210–1259) | Sesshō | 1237–1242 | Emperor Shijō |
| | Konoe Kanetsune (1210–1259) | Kampaku | 1242 | Emperor Go-Saga |
| | Nijō Yoshizane (1216–1273) | Kampaku | 1242–1246 | Emperor Go-Saga |
| | Ichijō Sanetsune (1223–1284) | Kampaku | 1246 | Emperor Go-Saga |
| | Ichijō Sanetsune (1223–1284) | Sesshō | 1246–1247 | Emperor Go-Fukakusa |
| | Konoe Kanetsune (1210–1259) | Sesshō | 1247–1252 | Emperor Go-Fukakusa |
| | Takatsukasa Kanehira (1228–1294) | Sesshō | 1252–1254 | Emperor Go-Fukakusa |
| | Takatsukasa Kanehira (1228–1294) | Kampaku | 1254–1261 | Emperor Go-Fukakusa |
| | Takatsukasa Kanehira (1228–1294) | Kampaku | 1254–1261 | Emperor Kameyama |
| | Nijō Yoshizane (1216–1273) | Kampaku | 1261–1265 | Emperor Kameyama |
| | Ichijō Sanetsune (1223–1284) | Kampaku | 1265–1267 | Emperor Kameyama |
| | Konoe Motohira (1246–1268) | Kampaku | 1267–1268 | Emperor Kameyama |
| | Takatsukasa Mototada (1247–1313) | Kampaku | 1268–1273 | Emperor Kameyama |
| | Kujō Tadaie (1229–1275) | Kampaku | 1273–1274 | Emperor Kameyama |
| | Kujō Tadaie (1229–1275) | Sesshō | 1274 | Emperor Go-Uda |
| | Ichijō Ietsune (1248–1293) | Sesshō | 1274–1275 | Emperor Go-Uda |
| | Takatsukasa Kanehira (1228–1294) | Sesshō | 1275–1278 | Emperor Go-Uda |
| | Takatsukasa Kanehira (1228–1294) | Kampaku | 1278–1287 | Emperor Go-Uda |
| | Nijō Morotada (1254–1341) | Kampaku | 1287–1289 | Emperor Go-Uda |
| | Nijō Morotada (1254–1341) | Kampaku | 1287–1289 | Emperor Fushimi |
| | Konoe Iemoto (1261–1296) | Kampaku | 1289–1291 | Emperor Fushimi |
| | Kujō Tadanori (1248–1332) | Kampaku | 1291–1293 | Emperor Fushimi |
| | Konoe Iemoto (1261–1296) | Kampaku | 1293–1296 | Emperor Fushimi |
| | Takatsukasa Kanetada (1262–1301) | Kampaku | 1296–1298 | Emperor Fushimi |
| | Takatsukasa Kanetada (1262–1301) | Sesshō | 1298 | Emperor Go-Fushimi |
| | Nijō Kanemoto (1268–1334) | Sesshō | 1298–1300 | Emperor Go-Fushimi |
| | Nijō Kanemoto (1268–1334) | Kampaku | 1300–1305 | Emperor Go-Fushimi |
| | Nijō Kanemoto (1268–1334) | Kampaku | 1300–1305 | Emperor Go-Nijō |
| | Kujō Moronori (1273–1320) | Kampaku | 1305–1308 | Emperor Go-Nijō |
| | Kujō Moronori (1273–1320) | Sesshō | 1308 | Emperor Hanazono |
| | Takatsukasa Fuyuhira (1275–1327) | Sesshō | 1308–1311 | Emperor Hanazono |
| | Takatsukasa Fuyuhira (1275–1327) | Kampaku | 1311–1313 | Emperor Hanazono |
| | Konoe Iehira (1282–1324) | Kampaku | 1313–1315 | Emperor Hanazono |
| | Takatsukasa Fuyuhira (1275–1327) | Kampaku | 1315–1316 | Emperor Hanazono |
| | Nijō Michihira (1288–1335) | Kampaku | 1316–1318 | Emperor Hanazono |
| | Nijō Michihira (1288–1335) | Kampaku | 1316–1318 | Emperor Go-Daigo |
| | Ichijō Uchitsune (1291–1325) | Kampaku | 1318–1323 | Emperor Go-Daigo |
| | Kujō Fusazane (1290–1327) | Kampaku | 1323–1324 | Emperor Go-Daigo |
| | Takatsukasa Fuyuhira (1275–1327) | Kampaku | 1324–1327 | Emperor Go-Daigo |
| | Nijō Michihira (1288–1335) | Kampaku | 1327–1330 | Emperor Go-Daigo |
| | Konoe Tsunetada (1302–1352) | Kampaku | 1330 | Emperor Go-Daigo |
| | Takatsukasa Fuyunori (1295–1337) | Kampaku | 1330–1333 | Emperor Go-Daigo |
| | Takatsukasa Fuyunori (1295–1337) | Kampaku | 1330–1333 | Emperor Kōgon |
| | Konoe Tsunetada (1302–1352) | Kampaku | 1336–1337 | Emperor Kōmyō |
| | Konoe Mototsugu (1305–1354) | Kampaku | 1337–1338 | Emperor Kōmyō |
| | Ichijō Tsunemichi (1317–1365) | Kampaku | 1338–1342 | Emperor Kōmyō |
| | Kujō Michinori (1315–1349) | Kampaku | 1342 | Emperor Kōmyō |
| | Takatsukasa Morohira (1310–1353) | Kampaku | 1342–1346 | Emperor Kōmyō |
| | Nijō Yoshimoto (1320–1388) | Kampaku | 1346–1358 | Emperor Kōmyō |
| | Nijō Yoshimoto (1320–1388) | Kampaku | 1346–1358 | Emperor Sukō |
| | Nijō Yoshimoto (1320–1388) | Kampaku | 1346–1358 | Emperor Go-Kōgon |
| | Kujō Tsunenori (1331–1400) | Kampaku | 1358–1361 | Emperor Go-Kōgon |
| | Konoe Michitsugu (1333–1387) | Kampaku | 1361–1363 | Emperor Go-Kōgon |
| | Nijō Yoshimoto (1320–1388) | Kampaku | 1363–1367 | Emperor Go-Kōgon |
| | Takatsukasa Fuyumichi (1330–1386) | Kampaku | 1367–1369 | Emperor Go-Kōgon |
| | Nijō Moroyoshi (1345–1382) | Kampaku | 1369–1375 | Emperor Go-Kōgon |
| | Nijō Moroyoshi (1345–1382) | Kampaku | 1369–1375 | Emperor Go-En'yū |
| | Kujō Tadamoto (1345–1397) | Kampaku | 1375–1379 | Emperor Go-En'yū |
| | Nijō Morotsugu (1356–1400) | Kampaku | 1379–1382 | Emperor Go-En'yū |
| | Nijō Yoshimoto (1320–1388) | Sesshō | 1382–1388 | Emperor Go-Komatsu |
| | Konoe Kanetsugu (1360–1388) | Sesshō | 1388 | Emperor Go-Komatsu |
| | Nijō Yoshimoto (1320–1388) | Sesshō | 1388 | Emperor Go-Komatsu |
| | Nijō Yoshimoto (1320–1388) | Kampaku | 1388 | Emperor Go-Komatsu |
| | Nijō Morotsugu (1356–1400) | Kampaku | 1388–1394 | Emperor Go-Komatsu |
| | Ichijō Tsunetsugu (1358–1418) | Kampaku | 1394–1398 | Emperor Go-Komatsu |
| | Nijō Morotsugu (1356–1400) | Kampaku | 1398–1399 | Emperor Go-Komatsu |
| | Ichijō Tsunetsugu (1358–1418) | Kampaku | 1399–1408 | Emperor Go-Komatsu |
| | Konoe Tadatsugu (1383–1454) | Kampaku | 1408–1409 | Emperor Go-Komatsu |
| | Nijō Mitsumoto (1383–1410) | Kampaku | 1409–1410 | Emperor Go-Komatsu |
| | Ichijō Tsunetsugu (1358–1418) | Kampaku | 1410–1418 | Emperor Go-Komatsu |
| | Ichijō Tsunetsugu (1358–1418) | Kampaku | 1410–1418 | Emperor Shōkō |
| | Kujō Mitsuie (1394–1449) | Kampaku | 1418–1424 | Emperor Shōkō |
| | Nijō Mochimoto (1390–1445) | Kampaku | 1424–1428 | Emperor Shōkō |
| | Nijō Mochimoto (1390–1445) | Sesshō | 1428–1432 | Emperor Go-Hanazono |
| | Ichijō Kaneyoshi (1402–1481) | Sesshō | 1432 | Emperor Go-Hanazono |
| | Nijō Mochimoto (1390–1445) | Sesshō | 1432–1433 | Emperor Go-Hanazono |
| | Nijō Mochimoto (1390–1445) | Kampaku | 1433–1445 | Emperor Go-Hanazono |
| | Konoe Fusatsugu (1402–1488) | Kampaku | 1445–1447 | Emperor Go-Hanazono |
| | Ichijō Kaneyoshi (1402–1481) | Kampaku | 1447–1453 | Emperor Go-Hanazono |
| | Takatsukasa Fusahira (1408–1472) | Kampaku | 1454–1455 | Emperor Go-Hanazono |
| | Nijō Mochimichi (1416–1493) | Kampaku | 1455–1458 | Emperor Go-Hanazono |
| | Ichijō Norifusa (1423–1480) | Kampaku | 1458–1463 | Emperor Go-Hanazono |
| | Nijō Mochimichi (1416–1493) | Kampaku | 1463–1467 | Emperor Go-Hanazono |
| | Nijō Mochimichi (1416–1493) | Kampaku | 1463–1467 | Emperor Go-Tsuchimikado |
| | Ichijō Kaneyoshi (1402–1481) | Kampaku | 1467–1470 | Emperor Go-Tsuchimikado |
| | Nijō Masatsugu (1443–1480) | Kampaku | 1470–1476 | Emperor Go-Tsuchimikado |
| | Kujō Masamoto (1445–1516) | Kampaku | 1476–1479 | Emperor Go-Tsuchimikado |
| | Konoe Masaie (1445–1505) | Kampaku | 1479–1483 | Emperor Go-Tsuchimikado |
| | Takatsukasa Masahira (1445–1517) | Kampaku | 1483–1487 | Emperor Go-Tsuchimikado |
| | Kujō Masatada (1439–1488) | Kampaku | 1487–1488 | Emperor Go-Tsuchimikado |
| | Ichijō Fuyuyoshi (1465–1514) | Kampaku | 1488–1493 | Emperor Go-Tsuchimikado |
| | Konoe Hisamichi (1472–1544) | Kampaku | 1493–1497 | Emperor Go-Tsuchimikado |
| | Nijō Hisamoto (1471–1497) | Kampaku | 1497 | Emperor Go-Tsuchimikado |
| | Ichijō Fuyuyoshi (1465–1514) | Kampaku | 1497–1501 | Emperor Go-Tsuchimikado |
| | Ichijō Fuyuyoshi (1465–1514) | Kampaku | 1497–1501 | Emperor Go-Kashiwabara |
| | Kujō Hisatsune (1469–1530) | Kampaku | 1501–1513 | Emperor Go-Kashiwabara |
| | Konoe Hisamichi (1472–1544) | Kampaku | 1513–1514 | Emperor Go-Kashiwabara |
| | Takatsukasa Kanesuke (1480–1552) | Kampaku | 1514–1518 | Emperor Go-Kashiwabara |
| | Nijō Korefusa (1496–1551) | Kampaku | 1518–1525 | Emperor Go-Kashiwabara |
| | Konoe Taneie (1503–1566) | Kampaku | 1525–1533 | Emperor Go-Kashiwabara |
| | Konoe Taneie (1503–1566) | Kampaku | 1525–1533 | Emperor Go-Nara |
| | Kujō Tanemichi (1507–1594) | Kampaku | 1533–1534 | Emperor Go-Nara |
| | Nijō Korefusa (1496–1551) | Kampaku | 1534–1536 | Emperor Go-Nara |
| | Konoe Taneie (1503–1566) | Kampaku | 1536–1542 | Emperor Go-Nara |
| | Takatsukasa Tadafuyu (1509–1546) | Kampaku | 1542–1545 | Emperor Go-Nara |
| | Ichijō Fusamichi (1509–1556) | Kampaku | 1545–1548 | Emperor Go-Nara |
| | Nijō Haruyoshi (1526–1579) | Kampaku | 1548–1553 | Emperor Go-Nara |
| | Ichijō Kanefuyu (1529–1554) | Kampaku | 1553–1554 | Emperor Go-Nara |
| | Konoe Sakihisa (1536–1612) | Kampaku | 1554–1568 | Emperor Go-Nara |
| | Konoe Sakihisa (1536–1612) | Kampaku | 1554–1568 | Emperor Ōgimachi |
| | Nijō Haruyoshi (1526–1579) | Kampaku | 1568–1578 | Emperor Ōgimachi |
| | Kujō Kanetaka (1553–1636) | Kampaku | 1578–1581 | Emperor Ōgimachi |
| | Ichijō Uchimoto (1548–1611) | Kampaku | 1581–1585 | Emperor Ōgimachi |
| | Nijō Akizane (1556–1619) | Kampaku | 1585 | Emperor Ōgimachi |
| | Toyotomi Hideyoshi (1538–1598) | Kampaku | 1585–1591 | Emperor Ōgimachi |
| | Toyotomi Hideyoshi (1538–1598) | Kampaku | 1585–1591 | Emperor Go-Yōzei |
| | Toyotomi Hidetsugu (1568–1595) | Kampaku | 1591–1595 | Emperor Go-Yōzei |
| | Kujō Kanetaka (1553–1636) | Kampaku | 1600–1604 | Emperor Go-Yōzei |
| | Konoe Nobutada (1565–1614) | Kampaku | 1605–1606 | Emperor Go-Yōzei |
| | Takatsukasa Nobufusa (1565–1658) | Kampaku | 1606–1608 | Emperor Go-Yōzei |
| | Kujō Yukiie (1586–1665) | Kampaku | 1608–1612 | Emperor Go-Yōzei |
| | Kujō Yukiie (1586–1665) | Kampaku | 1608–1612 | Emperor Go-Mizunoo |
| | Takatsukasa Nobuhisa (1590–1621) | Kampaku | 1612–1615 | Emperor Go-Mizunoo |
| | Nijō Akizane (1556–1619) | Kampaku | 1615–1619 | Emperor Go-Mizunoo |
| | Kujō Yukiie (1586–1665) | Kampaku | 1619–1623 | Emperor Go-Mizunoo |
| | Konoe Nobuhiro (1599–1649) | Kampaku | 1623–1629 | Emperor Go-Mizunoo |
| | Ichijō Akiyoshi (1605–1672) | Kampaku | 1629 | Emperor Go-Mizunoo |
| | Ichijō Akiyoshi (1605–1672) | Sesshō | 1629–1635 | Empress Meishō |
| | Nijō Yasumichi (1607–1666) | Sesshō | 1635–1647 | Empress Meishō |
| | Nijō Yasumichi (1607–1666) | Sesshō | 1635–1647 | Emperor Go-Kōmyō |
| | Kujō Michifusa (1609–1647) | Sesshō | 1647 | Emperor Go-Kōmyō |
| | Ichijō Akiyoshi (1605–1672) | Sesshō | 1647 | Emperor Go-Kōmyō |
| | Ichijō Akiyoshi (1605–1672) | Kampaku | 1647–1651 | Emperor Go-Kōmyō |
| | Konoe Hisatsugu (1622–1653) | Kampaku | 1651–1653 | Emperor Go-Kōmyō |
| | Nijō Mitsuhira (1624–1682) | Kampaku | 1653–1663 | Emperor Go-Kōmyō |
| | Nijō Mitsuhira (1624–1682) | Kampaku | 1653–1663 | Emperor Go-Sai |
| | Nijō Mitsuhira (1624–1682) | Sesshō | 1663–1664 | Emperor Reigen |
| | Takatsukasa Fusasuke (1637–1700) | Sesshō | 1664–1668 | Emperor Reigen |
| | Takatsukasa Fusasuke (1637–1700) | Kampaku | 1668–1682 | Emperor Reigen |
| | Ichijō Kaneteru (1652–1705) | Kampaku | 1682–1687 | Emperor Reigen |
| | Ichijō Kaneteru (1652–1705) | Sesshō | 1687–1689 | Emperor Higashiyama |
| | Ichijō Kaneteru (1652–1705) | Kampaku | 1689–1690 | Emperor Higashiyama |
| | Konoe Motohiro (1648–1722) | Kampaku | 1690–1703 | Emperor Higashiyama |
| | Takatsukasa Kanehiro (1659–1725) | Kampaku | 1703–1707 | Emperor Higashiyama |
| | Konoe Iehiro (1667–1736) | Kampaku | 1707–1709 | Emperor Higashiyama |
| | Konoe Iehiro (1667–1736) | Sesshō | 1709–1712 | Emperor Nakamikado |
| | Kujō Sukezane (1669–1729) | Sesshō | 1712–1716 | Emperor Nakamikado |
| | Kujō Sukezane (1669–1729) | Kampaku | 1716–1722 | Emperor Nakamikado |
| | Nijō Tsunahira (1672–1732) | Kampaku | 1722–1726 | Emperor Nakamikado |
| | Konoe Iehisa (1687–1737) | Kampaku | 1726–1736 | Emperor Nakamikado |
| | Konoe Iehisa (1687–1737) | Kampaku | 1726–1736 | Emperor Sakuramachi |
| | Nijō Yoshitada (1689–1737) | Kampaku | 1736–1737 | Emperor Sakuramachi |
| | Ichijō Kaneka (1692–1751) | Kampaku | 1737–1746 | Emperor Sakuramachi |
| | Ichijō Michika (1722–1769) | Kampaku | 1746–1747 | Emperor Sakuramachi |
| | Ichijō Michika (1722–1769) | Sesshō | 1747–1755 | Emperor Momozono |
| | Ichijō Michika (1722–1769) | Kampaku | 1755–1757 | Emperor Momozono |
| | Konoe Uchisaki (1728–1785) | Kampaku | 1757–1762 | Emperor Momozono |
| | Konoe Uchisaki (1728–1785) | Sesshō | 1762–1772 | Empress Go-Sakuramachi |
| | Konoe Uchisaki (1728–1785) | Sesshō | 1762–1772 | Emperor Go-Momozono |
| | Konoe Uchisaki (1728–1785) | Kampaku | 1772–1778 | Emperor Go-Momozono |
| | Kujō Naozane (1717–1787) | Kampaku | 1778–1779 | Emperor Go-Momozono |
| | Kujō Naozane (1717–1787) | Sesshō | 1779–1785 | Emperor Kōkaku |
| | Kujō Naozane (1717–1787) | Kampaku | 1785–1787 | Emperor Kōkaku |
| | Takatsukasa Sukehira (1738–1819) | Kampaku | 1787–1791 | Emperor Kōkaku |
| | Ichijō Teruyoshi (1756–1795) | Kampaku | 1791–1795 | Emperor Kōkaku |
| | Takatsukasa Masahiro (1761–1841) | Kampaku | 1795–1814 | Emperor Kōkaku |
| | Ichijō Tadayoshi (1774–1837) | Kampaku | 1814–1823 | Emperor Kōkaku |
| | Ichijō Tadayoshi (1774–1837) | Kampaku | 1814–1823 | Emperor Ninkō |
| | Takatsukasa Masamichi (1789–1868) | Kampaku | 1823–1856 | Emperor Ninkō |
| | Takatsukasa Masamichi (1789–1868) | Kampaku | 1823–1856 | Emperor Kōmei |
| | Kujō Hisatada (1798–1871) | Kampaku | 1856–1862 | Emperor Kōmei |
| | Konoe Tadahiro (1808–1898) | Kampaku | 1862–1863 | Emperor Kōmei |
| | Takatsukasa Sukehiro (1807–1878) | Kampaku | 1863 | Emperor Kōmei |
| | Nijō Nariyuki (1816–1878) | Kampaku | 1863–1866 | Emperor Kōmei |
| | Nijō Nariyuki (1816–1878) | Sesshō | 1867–1868 | Emperor Meiji |
| | Crown Prince Hirohito (1901–1989) | Sesshō | 1921–1926 | Emperor Taishō |

== See also ==
- Daijō-kan
- Sessei (written with the same characters as Sesshō)
- Taikun

== General references ==
- Brown, Delmer M; Ishida, Ichirō, eds. (1979) [Jien, c. 1220], Gukanshō [The Future and the Past, a translation and study of […] an interpretative history of Japan written in 1219], Berkeley: University of California Press, ISBN 0-520-03460-0
- Titsingh, Isaac, ed. (1834) [Siyun-sai Rin-siyo/Hayashi Gahō, 1652], Nipon o daï itsi ran [Annales des empereurs du Japon] (in French), Paris: Oriental Translation Fund of Great Britain and Ireland, OCLC 84067437.
