= Nijō Akizane =

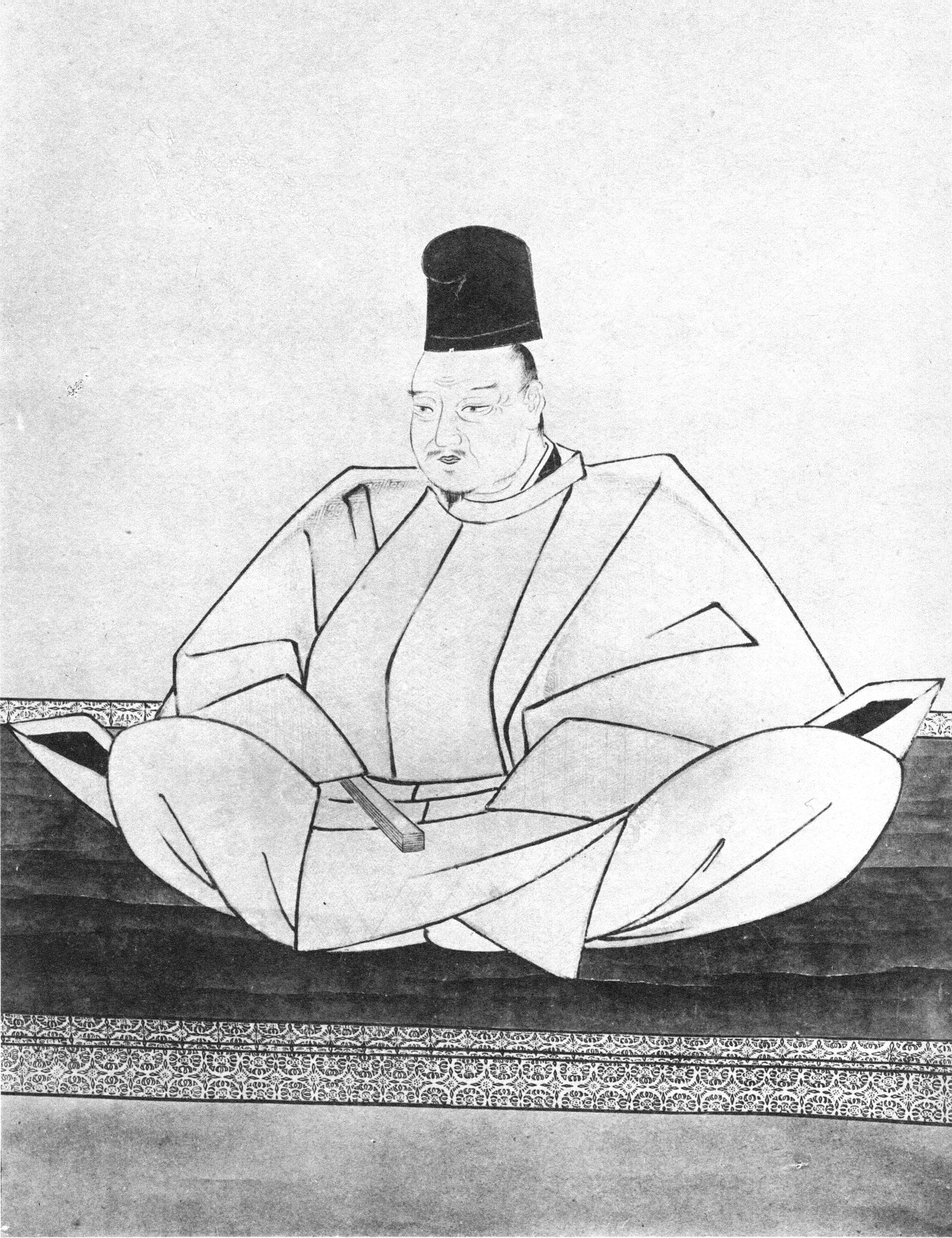
- Born: December 2, 1556
- Died: August 23, 1619 (aged 62)
- Occupation: court noble
- Spouse: daughter of daimyō Oda Nobunaga
- Children: Nijō Yasumichi
- Father: Nijō Haruyoshi

Nijō Akizane (二条 昭実; December 2, 1556 – August 23, 1619), son of regent Nijō Haruyoshi, was a Japanese kugyō (court noble) of the Azuchi–Momoyama period and the early Edo period. He held the regent position of kanpaku two times: once in 1585, and again from 1615 to 1619. He married a daughter of daimyō Oda Nobunaga and the couple adopted Kujō Yukiie's son, who became known as Nijō Yasumichi.
