= Takatsukasa Fuyunori =

Takatsukasa Fuyunori (鷹司 冬教; 1295 – 1337), son of Mototada, was kugyo or highest-ranking Japanese court noble of the Kamakura period (1185–1333). Fuyuhira adopted him as a son. Morohira was his adopted son. He held a regent position Kampaku from 1330 to 1333.
