= Takatsukasa Fusahira =

Takatsukasa Fusahira (鷹司 房平; ? – 1472), son of Fuyuie, was kugyo or highest-ranking Japanese court noble of the Muromachi period (1336–1573). He held a regent position Kampaku from 1454 to 1455. Regent Masahira was his son.
