= Ichijō Uchimoto =

Ichijō Uchimoto (一条 内基; 1548 – August 9, 1611), son of regent Fusamichi with daughter of Ichijo Fuyuyoshi, was kugyō (court noble) of the Azuchi–Momoyama period (1568–1603) of Japan. He held a regent position kampaku from 1581 to 1585. He adopted Akiyoshi as his son.
