= Takatsukasa Kanesuke =

Takatsukasa Kanesuke (鷹司 兼輔; 1480–1552), son of Masahira, was a court noble (kugyo) of the late Muromachi period. He was regent of Kampaku from 1514 to 1518. Tadafuyu, his son, succeeded him as head of the Takatsukasa family.
