= Ichijō Tsunemichi =

Ichijō Tsunemichi (一条 経通; 1317 – April 1, 1365), son of regent Uchitsune, was a kugyō or Japanese court noble of the Muromachi period (1336–1573). He held a regent position kampaku from 1338 to 1342. Tsunetsugu was his adopted son.

== Family ==
- Father: Ichijo Uchitsune
- Mother: daughter of Saionji Kin’aki
- Wife: Toin no Rinzu
- Children:
  - Ichijo Uchitsugu (1335/1336-1352?)
  - Ichijo Fusatsune (1347/1348-1366)
  - Jisai
  - Genru
- Adopted Son: Ichijo Tsunetsugu
