= Takatsukasa Nobufusa =

Court noble in Early Edo period (1565 - 1658)

Takatsukasa Nobufusa (鷹司 信房; 17 November 1565 – 18 January 1658) was a court noble (kuge) of the early Edo period. Born to Nijō Haruyoshi and adopted by Takatsukasa Tadafuyu, he revived the lineage of the Takatsukasa family. In 1606, he was appointed Kampaku, a regent position which he left two years later. In 1658, he died at age 92. With a daughter of the daimyō Sassa Narimasa, Teruko, he had a son, Nobuhisa, and a daughter, Takako, who married Tokugawa Iemitsu in 1623.

== Genealogy ==
- Father: Nijō Haruyoshi
- Mother: Fushimi-no-miya Sadaatsu
  - Wife: Sassa Teruko
    - son: Takatsukasa Nobuhisa
    - daughter: Takatsukasa Takako, married Tokugawa Iemitsu
  - Concubine: Lady Shirakawa
    - son: Matsuidara Nobuhira
  - Concubine: unknown name
    - Daughter: unknown name
