= Ichijō Fuyuyoshi =

Ichijō Fuyuyoshi (一条 冬良; July 29, 1465 – April 21, 1514), son of regent Kaneyoshi, was a kugyō or court noble of the Muromachi period (1336–1573) of Japan. He held a regent position kampaku two times from 1488 to 1493 and from 1497 to 1501. He adopted Fusamichi as son who was also his daughter's husband.

== Family ==
- Father: Ichijo Kaneyoshi
- Mother: Minami no Kata (1443-1490)
- Wife: daughter of Nijo Masatsugu
- Daughter: married Ichijo Fusamichi
