= Nijō Michihira =

Japanese noble (1288–1335)

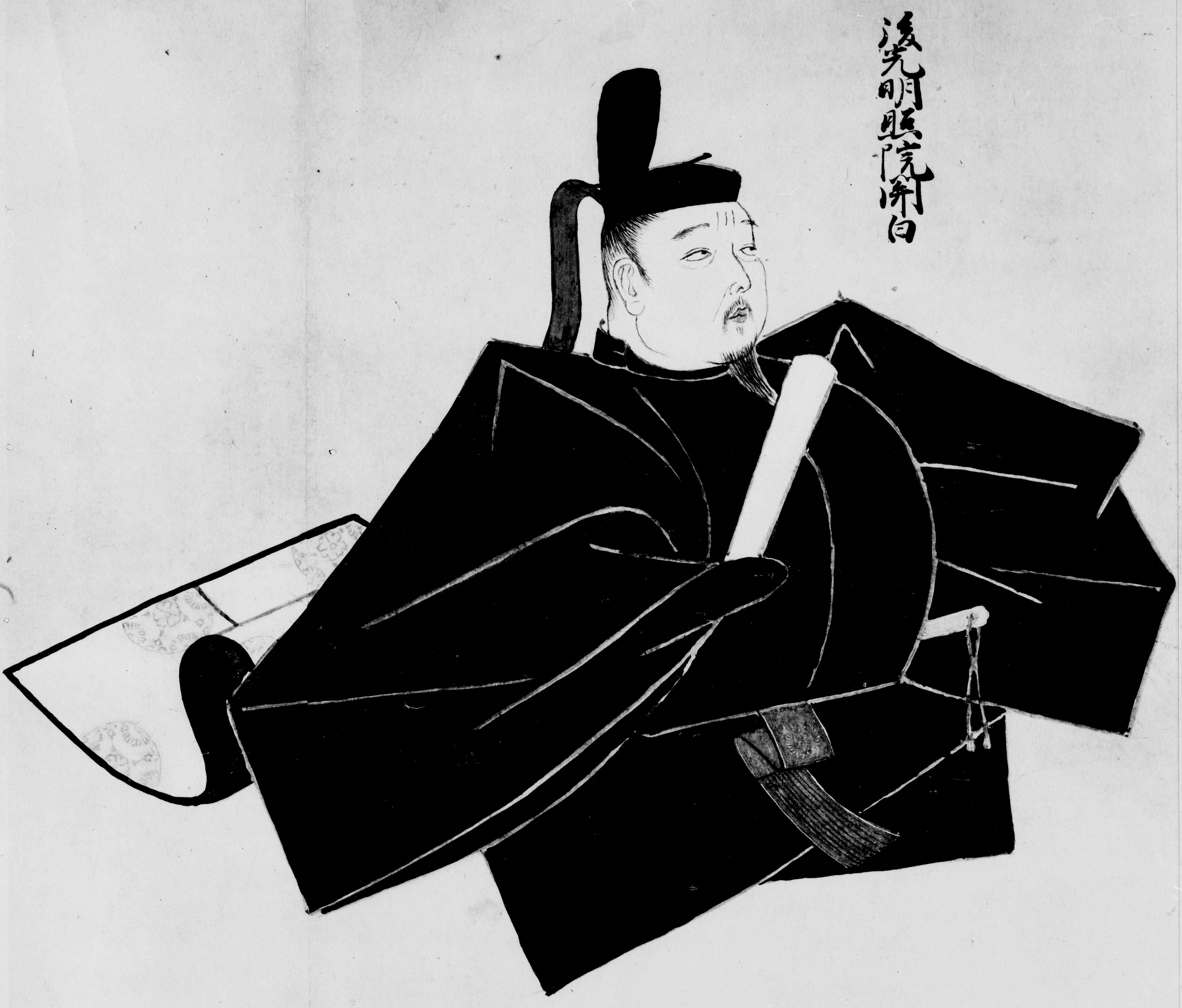

Nijō Michihira (二条道平; 1288 – February 27, 1335) was a Japanese kugyō (court noble) of the late Kamakura period. He was the son of regent Nijō Kanemoto.

Michihira held the position of kampaku (chief advisor to the emperor) from 1316–1318 and from 1327–1330. He married a daughter of Nijō Morotada and a daughter of Saionji Kin'aki. From the latter he had a son, Nijō Yoshimoto, and a daughter who was later a consort of Emperor Go-Daigo, and another son who was adopted by the Tominokouji family and became known as Tominokouji Michinao.
