= Nijō Yoshizane =

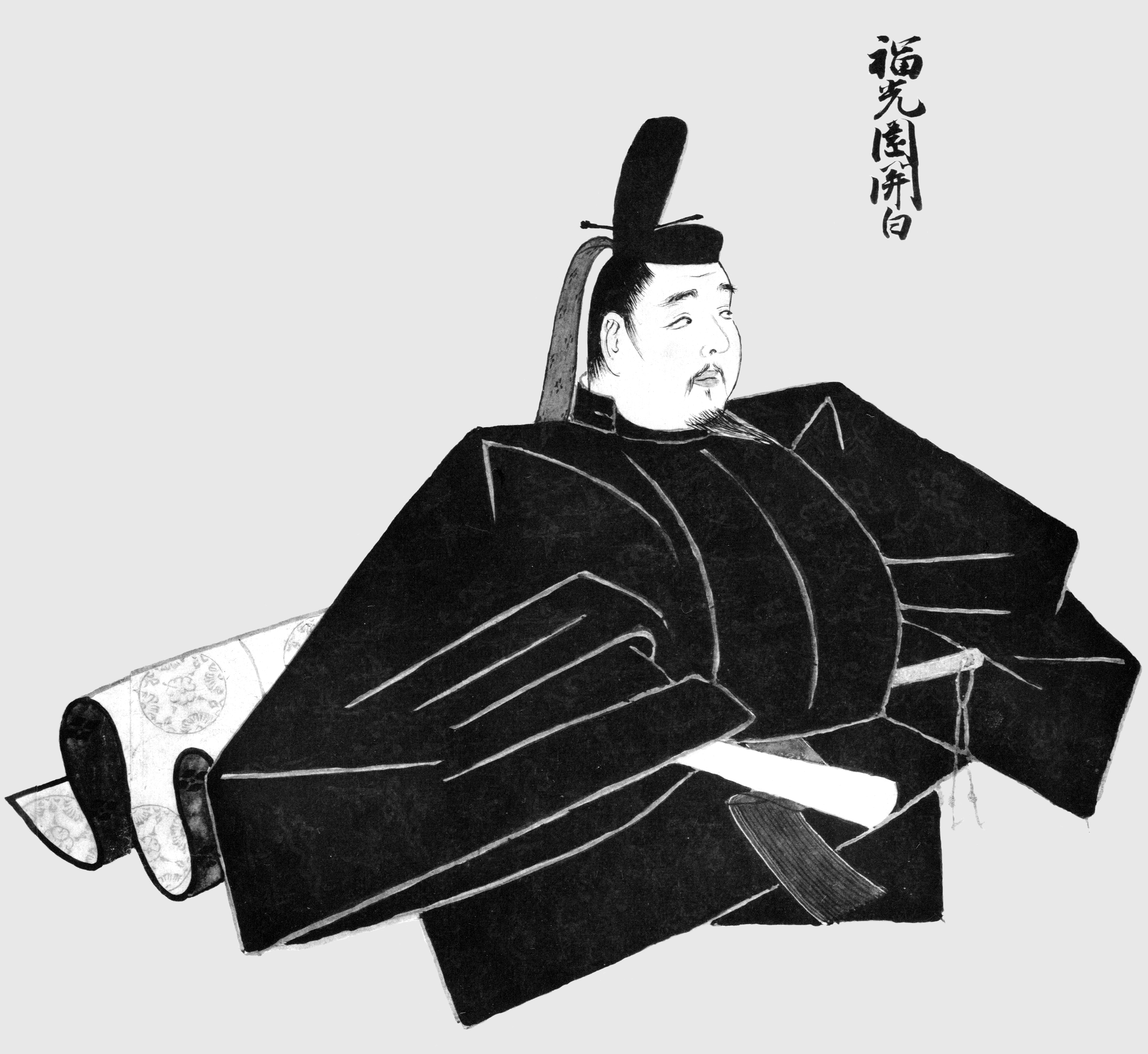
Nijō Yoshizane

Nijō Yoshizane (二条 良実; 1216 – 11 January 1270), son of regent Kujō Michiie, was a Japanese kugyō (court noble) of the Kamakura period (1185–1333) of Japan. He held a regent position kampaku two times from 1242 to 1246 and from 1261 to 1265. He was the father of Nijō Morotada.
