= Nijō Haruyoshi =

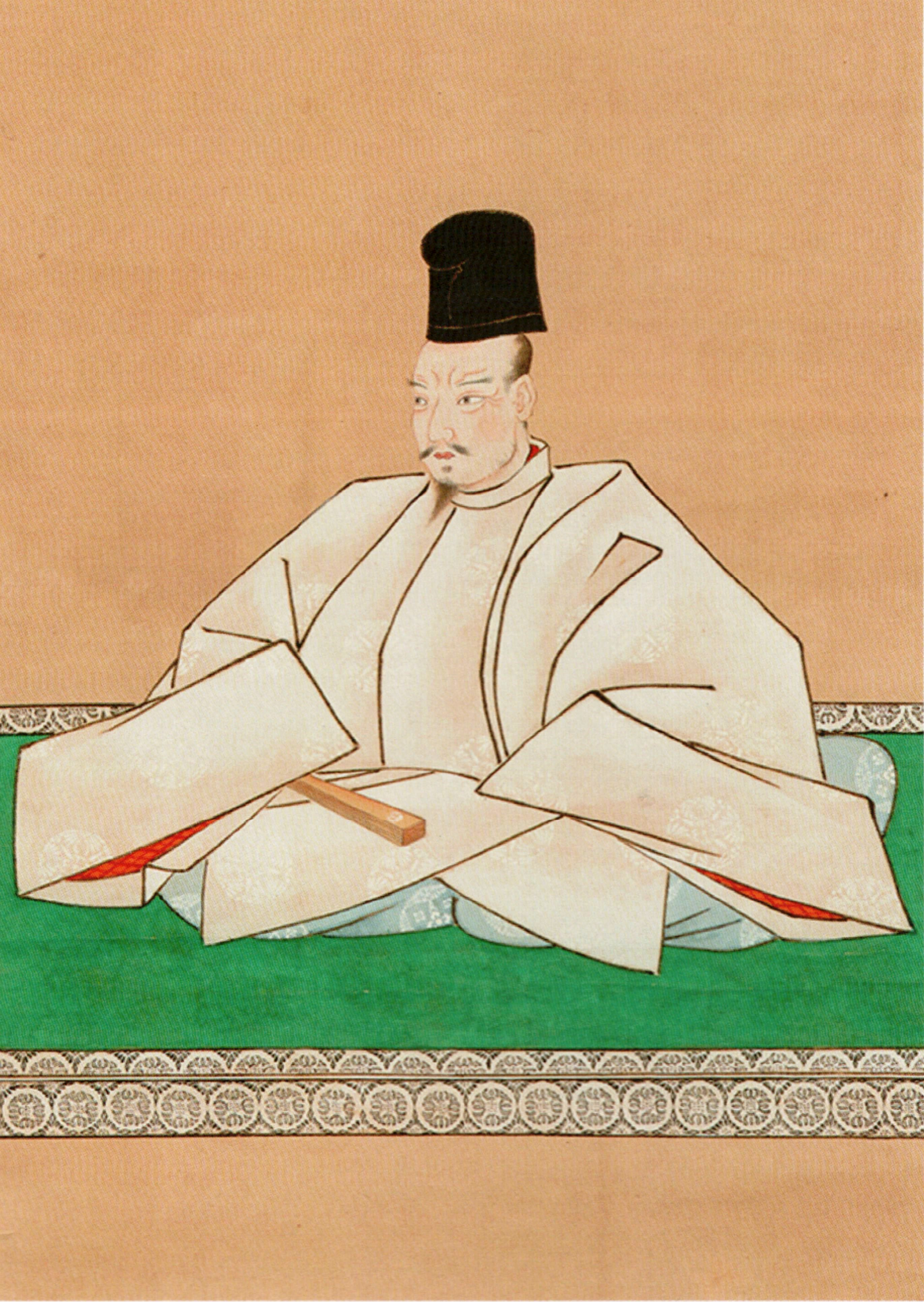

Nijō Haruyoshi (二条 晴良; 1526–1579), son of regent Nijō Korefusa, was a Japanese kugyō (court noble) of the Muromachi period (1336–1573). He was held Daijō-daijin position from 1568 to 1578, and held a regent position kampaku two times from 1548 to 1553 and from 1568 to 1578. He married a daughter of prince Fushimi-no-miya Sadaatsu, who gave birth to Kujō Kanetaka, Nijō Akizane, and Takatsukasa Nobufusa.
