= Nijō Yoshimoto =

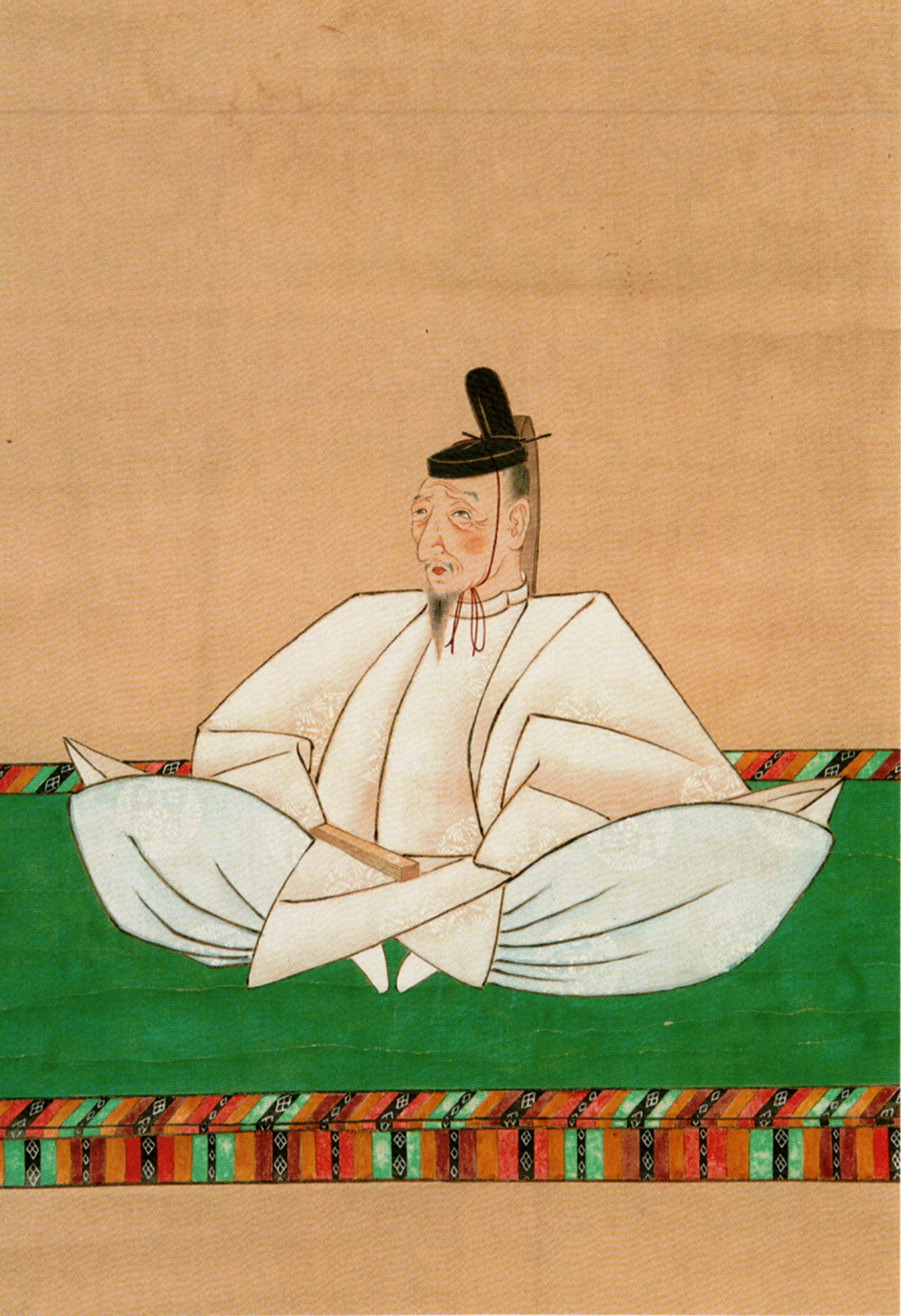
Nijō Yoshimoto

Nijō Yoshimoto (二条 良基; 1320 – July 16, 1388), son of regent Nijō Michihira, was a Japanese kugyō (court noble), waka poet, and renga master of the early Nanboku-chō period (1336–1392).

Yoshimoto's wife gave birth to Nijō Moroyoshi. With another woman, he had sons Nijō Morotsugu and Ichijō Tsunetsugu.

== Career as government official ==
Yoshimoto held the regent position of kampaku three times (from 1346 to 1347, from 1363 to 1367, and in 1388), and that of sesshō twice (from 1382 to 1388, and in 1388).

- 1381 (Eitoku 1, 7th month): Yoshimoto is made Daijō Daijin.
- 1387 (Kakei 1, 1st month): Yoshimoto is deprived of his position as daijō daijin.
- 1388 (Kakei 2, 6th month): Yoshitomo dies at age 69; and his son Nijō Morotsugu succeeds him with the title of kampaku.

== Scholar-poet ==
Yoshimoto learned waka from Ton'a and renga from Gusai and Kyūsei. He regarded himself primarily as a waka poet; he authored several treatises on the subject. It is for renga that he is best known. By the age of thirty, he was regarded as an authority on the subject. He authored a number of books including:

- Renri Hishō (連理秘抄, A Secret Treatise of Renga Principles; c. 1349), a text on renga poetics
- Tsukubashū (菟玖波集, The Tsukuba Collection; c. 1356), the first edited collection of renga
- Tsukuba Mondō (筑波問答, The Tsukuba Dialogues; 1357-1372), general discourse on renga in question-answer style
- Gumonkenchū (愚問賢註; 1363), a discussion of renga style; co-authored with Ton'a
- Ōan Shinshiki (応安新式; c. 1372), a text on renga rules
- Kinrai Fūteishō (近来風体抄; 1387), a treatise on waka poetics

=== Historian ===
The author of Masukagami is unknown, but it is believed that Nijō Yoshimoto had a hand in its writing. The book is a Japanese historical tale describing events understood to have occurred between 1368 and 1376.

His diary, Kuchi-ura, "gives considerable detail" of the Northern Court.
