= Ōmandokoro =

Mother of Toyotomi Hideyoshi

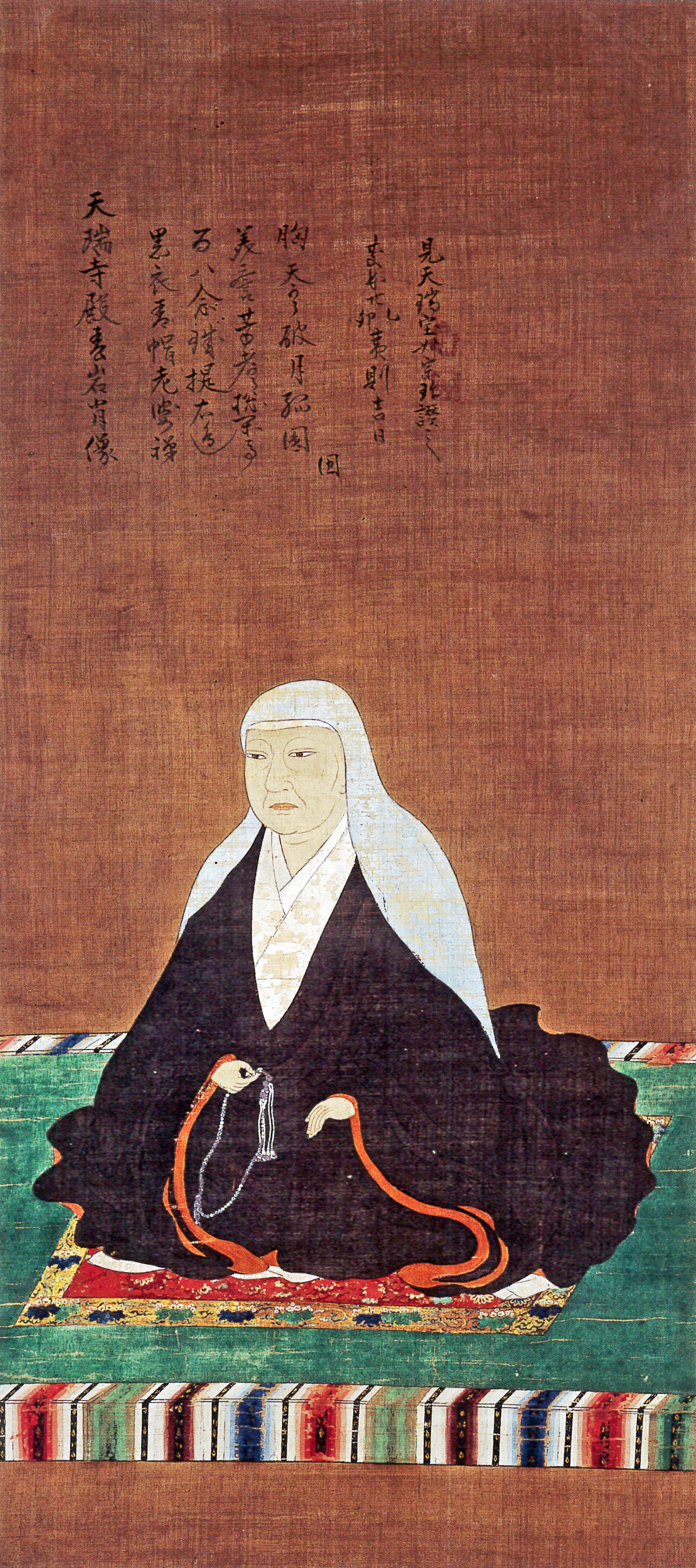
Portrait of Ōmandokoro, later known as Tenzui'in

Ōmandokoro (大政所, 1516 – 29 August 1592) or Ōmandokoro Naka was the mother of the Japanese ruler Toyotomi Hideyoshi. She was also the mother of Asahi no kata, Tomo and Toyotomi Hidenaga.

== Biography ==
Ōmandokoro is said to have been born in Gokisu-mura, Owari Province. She was married to Kinoshita Yaemon, an Ashigaru of the Oda clan. They had at least two children, Tomo and Hideyoshi. She remarried when her husband died. There is some controversy whether Asahi no kata and Hidenaga were the children of her first or second husband.

There are several accounts describing her role in Hideyoshi's court. One source relates that due to her serious illness in 1588, Hideyoshi ordered ceremonies at major Shinto and Buddhist temples at Ise, Kasuga, Gion, Atago, Kitano, Kiyomizudera, Kofukuji, and Kuramadera. In 1591, she pleaded clemency for three senior Daitokuji abbots, who Hideyoshi intended to crucify.

Ōmandokoro and her daughter Asahi were sent as hostages to Tokugawa Ieyasu in 1586 when Hideyoshi summoned him to Osaka upon his promotion to the rank of Gon-Chunagon. According to some accounts, one of the warriors, Honda Sakuzaemon Shigetsugu, was said to have advised Ieyasu: "You have to be careful, my lord, for there are a lot of elderly ladies-in-waiting about the Court, and Hideyoshi may quite likely have picked out one of them and sent her as substitute for his mother." This suggests that she was not well known to Ieyasu and his followers. Ieyasu entrusted her to one of his most trusted retainers, Ii Naomasa. The meeting between Ieyasu and Hideyoshi proceeded peacefully, culminating in Ieyasu's submission. This allowed Ōmandokoro to return to Osaka after about a month. However, when Ieyasu was on his way visiting Hideyoshi in Kyōto, a Tokugawa vassal named Honda Shigetsugu feared the safety of Ieyasu in Kyōto. Shigetsugu then piled wood blocks around Ōmandokoro's residents. He said that he will burn Ōmandokoro if Something happened to Ieyasu in Kyōto.

After Ieyasu meeting with Hideoshi, she reported to Hideyoshi that Naomasa had treated her very well.

She died in 1592. After her death, she received the Buddhist name Tenzui'in (天瑞院).

== Descendants ==
=== Imperial family ===
- Naka (Omandokoro)
- Tomoko (Tomo)
- Toyotomi Hidekatsu
- Toyotomi Sadako
- Michifusa
- Machihime
- Sukemi
- Yukinori
- Nijo Munemoto
- Harutaka
- Kujo Hisatada
- Michitaka
- Setsuko (Empress Teimei: Empress of Emperor Taisho)
- Showa Emperor

== Honours ==
- Junior First Rank (11 July 1585)

== See also ==
- Midaidokoro
