= Toyotomi Hideyoshi =

Military ruler of Japan from 1585 to 1598

Senior First Rank Toyotomi Hideyoshi
- 豊臣 秀吉
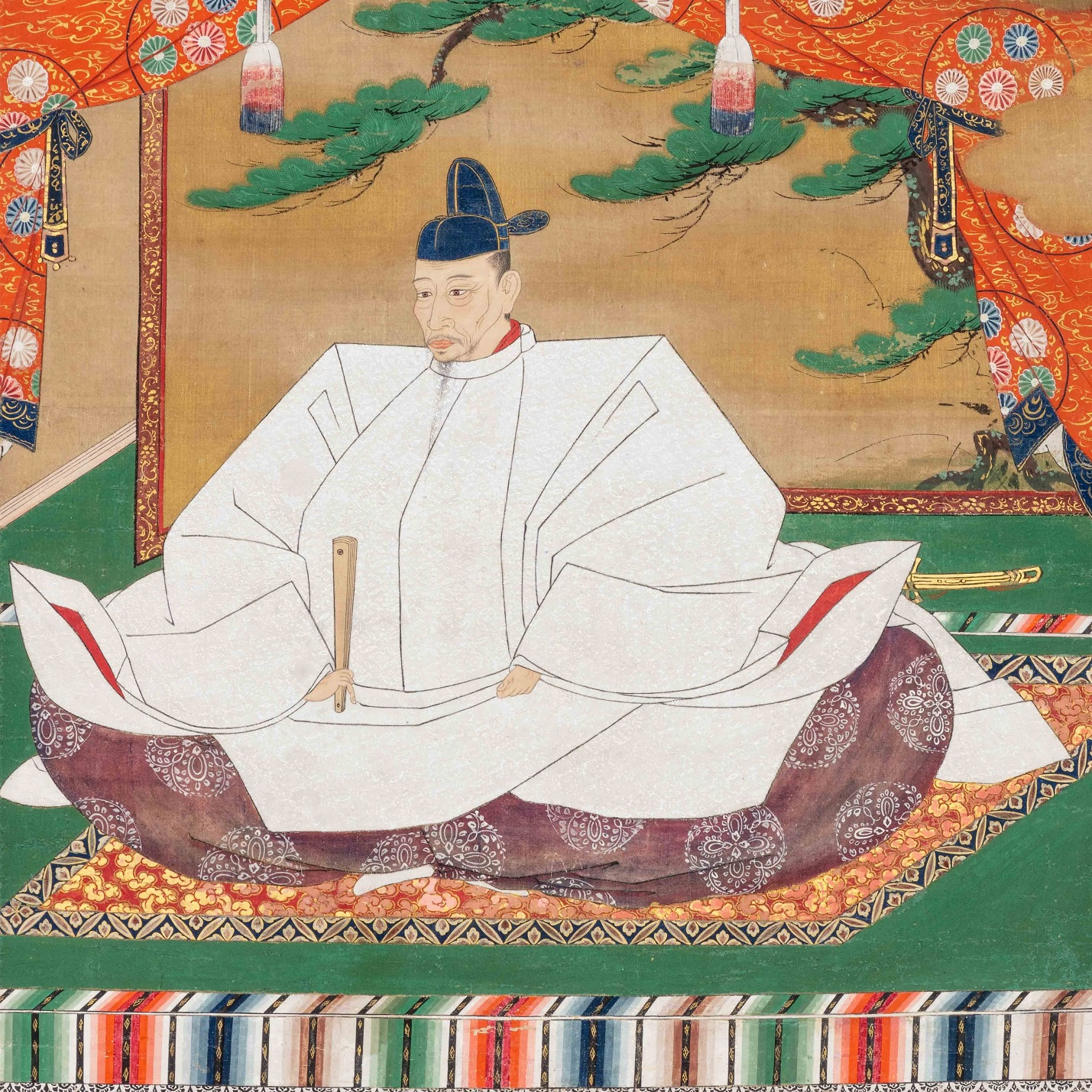
- Portrait by Kanō Mitsunobu, c. 1598

Chief Advisor to the Emperor (kampaku)
- In office August 6, 1585 – February 10, 1592
- Monarchs: Ōgimachi; Go-Yōzei
- Preceded by: Nijō Akizane
- Succeeded by: Toyotomi Hidetsugu

Chancellor of the Realm (daijō-daijin)
- In office February 2, 1586 – September 18, 1598
- Monarch: Go-Yōzei
- Preceded by: Konoe Sakihisa
- Succeeded by: Tokugawa Ieyasu

Head of Toyotomi clan
- In office 1585–1598
- Preceded by: Hashiba Hideyoshi
- Succeeded by: Toyotomi Hideyori

Head of Hashiba clan
- In office 1568–1585
- Succeeded by: Toyotomi clan

Personal details
- Born: Hiyoshimaru (日吉丸); March 17, 1537 Nakamura-ku, Nagoya, Owari Province
- Died: September 18, 1598 (aged 61) Fushimi Castle, Kyoto, Japan
- Spouses: Nene; Yodo-dono
- Domestic partner: Kaihime (concubine)
- Children: Hashiba Hidekatsu (adopted son); Toyotomi Tsurumatsu; Toyotomi Hideyori
- Parents: Kinoshita Yaemon (father); Ōmandokoro (mother)
- Relatives: Toyotomi Hidenaga (half-brother); Asahi no kata (half-sister); Tomo (Toyotomi) (sister); Toyotomi Hidetsugu (nephew); Konoe Sakihisa (adopted father)
- Religion: Shinto; Buddhism
- Other names: Kinoshita Tōkichirō (木下 藤吉郎); Hashiba Hideyoshi (羽柴 秀吉)
- Divine name: Toyokuni Daimyōjin (豊国大明神)
- Posthumous dharma name: Kokutai-yūshō-in-den Reizan Shunryū Daikoji (国泰祐松院殿霊山俊龍大居士)
- Nickname(s): "Kozaru" (little monkey) "Saru" (monkey)

Military service
- Allegiance: Oda clan; Toyotomi clan; Imperial Court
- Rank: Daimyō, kampaku, daijō-daijin
- Unit: Toyotomi clan Oda clan Hashiba clan
- Commands: Osaka Castle
- Battles/wars: Siege of Inabayama; Siege of Kanegasaki; Battle of Anegawa; Siege of Nagashima; Battle of Ichijodani; Siege of Itami; Battle of Nagashino; Siege of Mitsuji; Battle of Tedorigawa; Siege of Miki; Siege of Tottori; Siege of Takamatsu; Battle of Yamazaki; Battle of Shizugatake; Battle of Komaki and Nagakute; Negoro-ji Campaign; Toyama Campaign; Kyūshū campaign Odawara Campaign; Korean Campaign; See below

Japanese name
- Shinjitai: 豊臣 秀吉
- Kyūjitai: 豐臣 秀吉
- Kana: とよとみ ひでよし or とよとみ の ひでよし
Transcriptions
- Revised Hepburn: Toyotomi Hideyoshi or Toyotomi no Hideyoshi

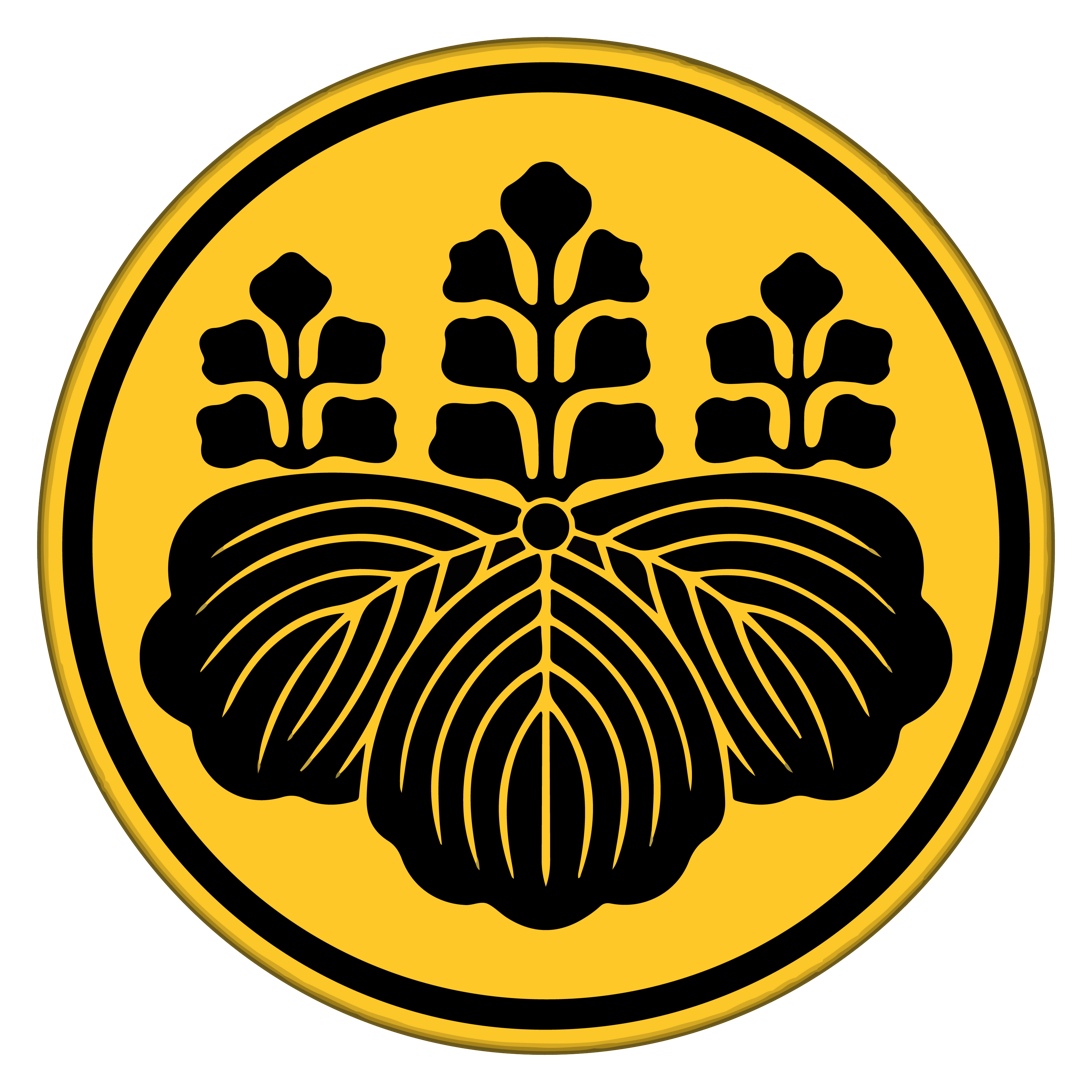
Toyotomi clan mon (Japanese emblem)

Toyotomi Hideyoshi (豊臣 秀吉; Japanese pronunciation: [tò̞.jó̞.tó̞.mʲí | çì.dé̞.jò̞.ɕì, -mʲí çí-, -jó̞.ɕí]; March 17, 1537 – September 18, 1598), otherwise known as Kinoshita Tōkichirō (木下 藤吉郎) and Hashiba Hideyoshi (羽柴 秀吉), was a Japanese samurai and daimyō (feudal lord) of the late Sengoku and Azuchi–Momoyama periods, regarded as the second "Great Unifier" of Japan. He rose to the rank and title of kampaku (関白, Imperial Regent) and daijō-daijin (太政大臣, Chancellor of the Realm), the highest offices at the imperial court. He was the first commoner to become kampaku. He then passed the position and title of kampaku to his nephew, Toyotomi Hidetsugu. He remained in power as Taikō (太閤), the title of a retired kampaku, until his death.

Hideyoshi rose from a peasant background as a retainer of the prominent lord Oda Nobunaga to become one of the most powerful men in Japanese history. He distinguished himself in many of Nobunaga's campaigns. After Nobunaga was killed in the Honnō-ji incident in 1582, Hideyoshi defeated the lord's assassin, Akechi Mitsuhide, at the Battle of Yamazaki and became his successor. Hideyoshi then continued Nobunaga's campaign to unify Japan, which brought the Sengoku period to a close.

Hideyoshi became the de facto leader of Japan and acquired the prestigious positions of daijō-daijin and kampaku by the mid-1580s. He conquered Shikoku in 1585 and Kyūshū in 1587, and completed the unification by winning the Siege of Odawara in 1590 and crushing the Kunohe rebellion in 1591. With the unification of Japan complete, Hideyoshi launched the Japanese invasions of Korea in 1592. Early success gave way to a military stalemate that damaged his prestige before his death in 1598. Hideyoshi's young son and successor Toyotomi Hideyori was displaced by Tokugawa Ieyasu at the Battle of Sekigahara in 1600, which led to the founding of the Tokugawa shogunate.

Hideyoshi's rule spans most of Japan's Azuchi–Momoyama period, which is named in part after his Momoyama Castle. Hideyoshi left an influential and lasting legacy in Japan, including Osaka Castle, the Tokugawa class system, the restriction on the possession of weapons to the samurai (the sword hunt), and the construction and restoration of many temples, some of which are still visible in Kyoto.

== Early life (1537–1558) ==
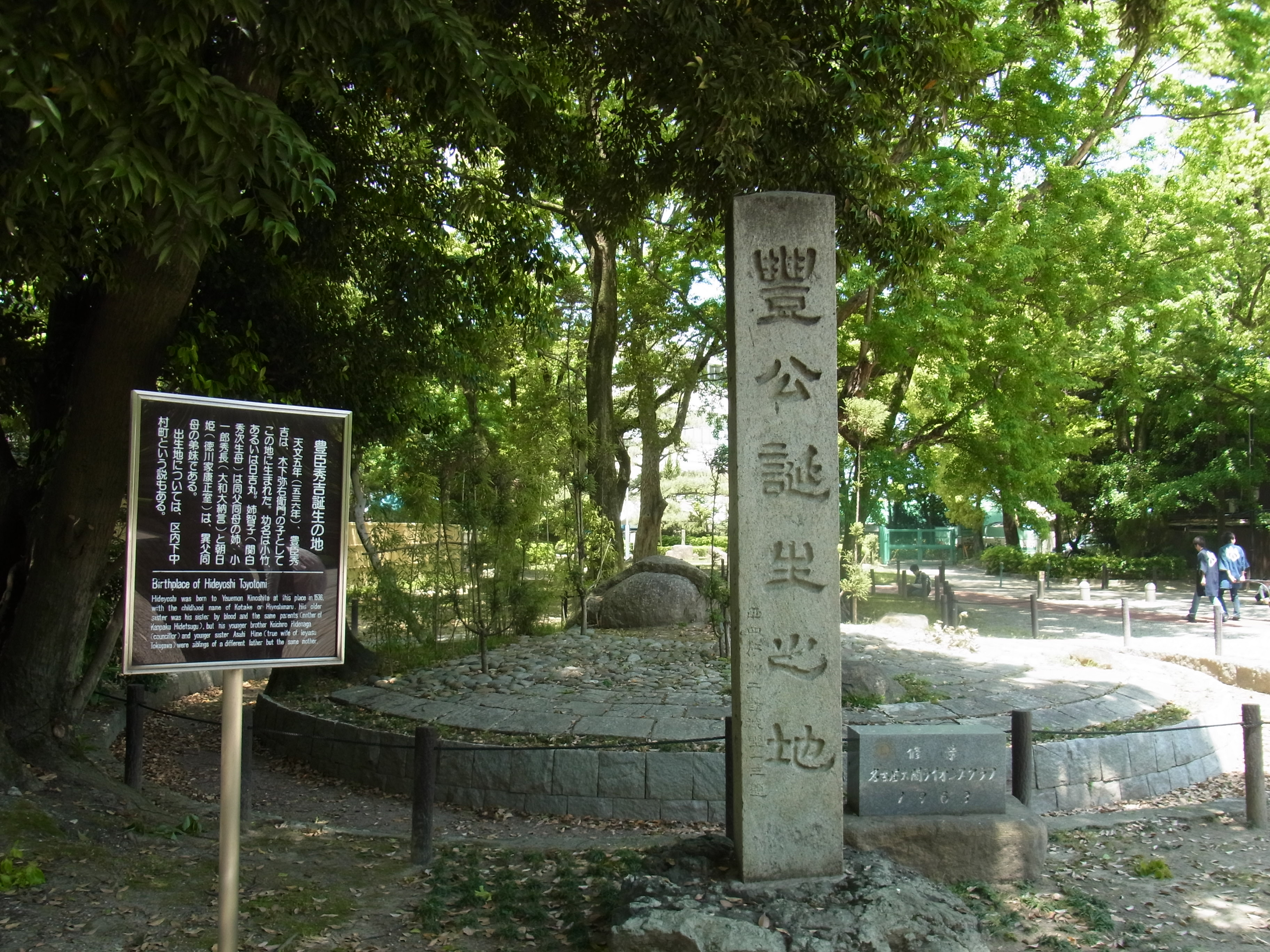
Nakamura Park in Nagoya, traditionally regarded as Hideyoshi's birthplace

According to tradition, Hideyoshi was born on the 6th day of the 2nd month of Tenbun 6 in the lunisolar Japanese calendar (March 17, 1537, in the Julian calendar) in Nakamura, Owari Province (present-day Nakamura Ward, Nagoya), during the chaotic Sengoku period, as the Ashikaga shogunate collapsed. Hideyoshi had no traceable samurai lineage, and his father Kinoshita Yaemon was an ashigaru – a peasant employed by the samurai as a foot soldier. Hideyoshi had no surname, and his childhood given name was Hiyoshimaru (日吉丸; Japanese pronunciation: [çì.jó̞.ɕí.mä̀.ɾɯ̈̀]), although variations exist. Yaemon died in 1543 when Hideyoshi was seven years old.

Contemporary writings from Ankokuji Ekei and Kakukane Ue, a retainer of the Shimazu clan, confirm Hideyoshi's poor background, with Ekei noting that he had begged in the streets.

Many legends describe Hideyoshi being sent to study at a temple as a young man, but he rejected temple life and went in search of adventure. Under the name Kinoshita Tōkichirō (木下 藤吉郎), he first joined the Imagawa clan as a servant to a local ruler named Matsushita Yukitsuna (松下之綱).

== Service under Nobunaga (1558–1582) ==
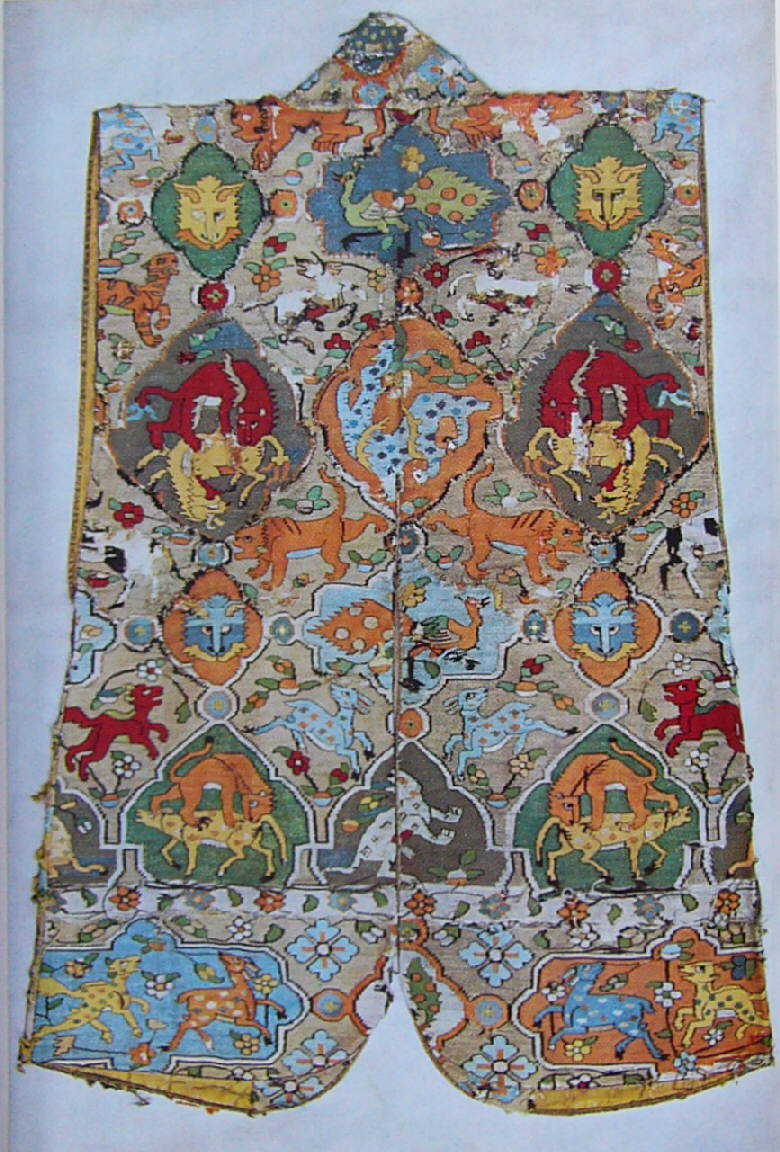
A Jinbaori robe with a pattern of birds and other animals which is said to have been worn by Hideyoshi

In 1558, Hideyoshi became an ashigaru for the powerful Oda clan, the rulers of his home province of Owari, now headed by the ambitious Oda Nobunaga. Hideyoshi soon became Nobunaga's sandal-bearer, a position of relatively high status. His biographers say he also managed the kitchen and supervised repairs to Kiyosu Castle, though the latter claim has been called "apocryphal".

In 1561, Hideyoshi married Nene (also known as One), the adopted daughter of Asano Nagakatsu, a descendant of Minamoto no Yorimitsu. Hideyoshi carried out repairs on Sunomata Castle with his younger half-brother Hashiba Koichirō, Hachisuka Masakatsu and Maeno Nagayasu. Sunomata lay in enemy territory, and according to legend Hideyoshi built a fort there overnight and discovered a secret route into Mount Inaba, after which much of the local garrison surrendered.

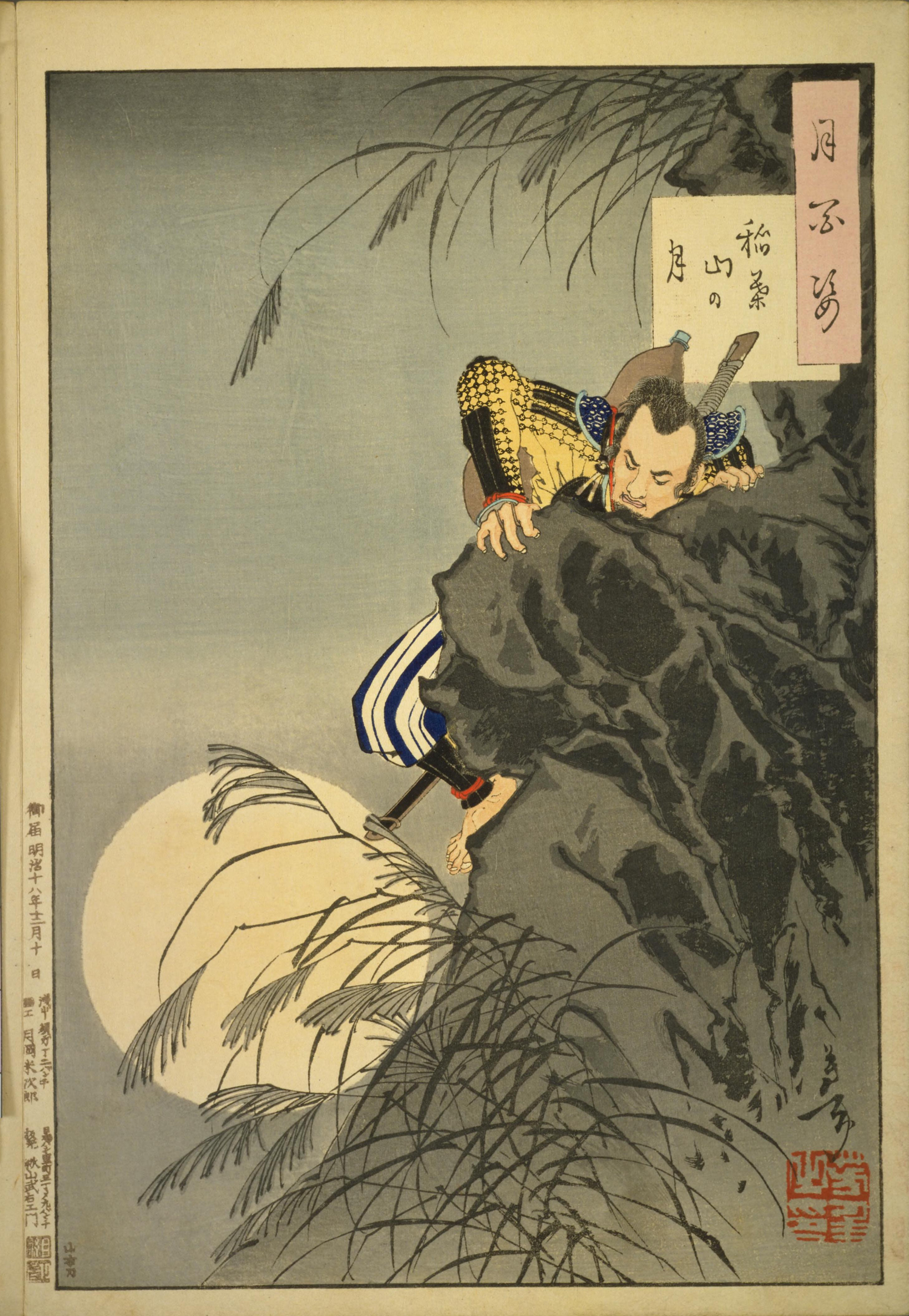
One Hundred Aspects of the Moon No. 6, by Yoshitoshi: "Mount Inaba Moon" 1885, 12th month. The young Toyotomi Hideyoshi (then named Kinoshita Tōkichirō) leads a small group assaulting the castle on Mount Inaba.

In 1564, Hideyoshi found success as a negotiator. He persuaded several Mino warlords to desert the Saitō clan, largely through bribery, among them the clan's strategist, Takenaka Shigeharu.

Nobunaga's easy victory at the Siege of Inabayama Castle in 1567 was largely due to Hideyoshi's efforts. In 1568, Hideyoshi became one of Nobunaga's most distinguished generals, eventually taking the name Hashiba Hideyoshi (羽柴 秀吉). The new surname included two characters, one each from Nobunaga's right-hand men Niwa Nagahide (丹羽 長秀) and Shibata Katsuie (柴田 勝家), and the new given name included characters from Akechi Mitsuhide (明智 光秀) and Mori Yoshinari (森 吉成).

In 1570, Hideyoshi protected Nobunaga's retreat from Azai-Asakura forces at Kanegasaki, in Tsuruga. Later, in the summer of 1570, Nobunaga burned the town below the Azai stronghold of Odani Castle and besieged nearby Yokoyama Castle. When the Azai and Asakura came to its relief, Nobunaga and Tokugawa Ieyasu fought them at the Battle of Anegawa on July 30, 1570 (the 28th day of the 6th month of Genki 1), and Hideyoshi was assigned to lead Oda troops into open battle for the first time. After the battle, Hideyoshi was placed in charge of Yokoyama Castle.

In 1573, after victorious campaigns against the Azai and Asakura, Nobunaga appointed Hideyoshi daimyō of three districts in the northern part of Ōmi Province. Hideyoshi first used the former Azai headquarters at Odani Castle, but soon moved to the lakeside town of Imahama on Lake Biwa, which he renamed "Nagahama", and built Nagahama Castle there. He also took control of the nearby gunsmithing village of Kunitomo, which had been making firearms since 1544. Under Hideyoshi's administration, Kunitomo's output of firearms increased dramatically. Later, Hideyoshi participated in the 1573 Siege of Nagashima.

In 1574, Hideyoshi and Araki Murashige captured Itami Castle, and in 1575 he fought in the Battle of Nagashino against the Takeda clan.

In 1576, he took part in the Siege of Mitsuji, part of the eleven-year Ishiyama Hongan-ji War. Later, Nobunaga sent Hideyoshi to Himeji Castle to conquer the Chūgoku region from the Mōri clan. Hideyoshi then fought in the Battle of Tedorigawa (1577), the Siege of Miki (1578), the Siege of Tottori (1581) and the Siege of Takamatsu (1582).

=== Death of Nobunaga ===
On June 21, 1582, during the Siege of Takamatsu, Oda Nobunaga and his eldest son and heir Nobutada were both killed in the Honnō-ji incident. Their assassination ended Nobunaga's quest to consolidate centralized power in Japan under his authority. Hideyoshi, seeking vengeance for the death of his lord, made peace with the Mōri clan and, eleven days after Nobunaga's death, met Akechi Mitsuhide and defeated him at the Battle of Yamazaki on July 2, 1582 (the 13th day of the 6th month of Tenshō 10), avenging Nobunaga and taking his authority and power for himself.

Meanwhile, the Hōjō clan and the Uesugi clan invaded Kai and Shinano provinces when they heard of Nobunaga's death, beginning the Tenshō-Jingo war. (Note: The name "Tenshō-Jingo War" was coined by Tashiro Takashi in 1980.) When the Oda clan learned of the defeat of Takigawa Kazumasu at the Battle of Kanagawa by the Hōjō clan, Hideyoshi sent a letter to Ieyasu on July 26, 1582 (the 7th day of the 7th month of Tenshō 10), authorizing him to lead military operations to secure the two provinces from the Hōjō and Uesugi clans. (Note: Ieyasu's position and actions here are not those of an independent feudal lord, but as a feudal lord under the Oda regime, with the aim of defeating the Hojo clan) As the war turned in Ieyasu's favor and Sanada Masayuki defected to the Tokugawa side, the Hōjō clan negotiated a truce. Hōjō Ujinobu and Ii Naomasa were the Hōjō and Tokugawa representatives for the preliminary meetings. Representatives of the Oda clan, including Oda Nobukatsu, Oda Nobutaka, and Hideyoshi himself, mediated the negotiations. The truce took effect on November 24, 1582 (the 29th day of the 10th month of Tenshō 10), and Ieyasu and Hōjō Ujinao exchanged family members as hostages as a sign of goodwill.

== Rise to power (1582–1585) ==
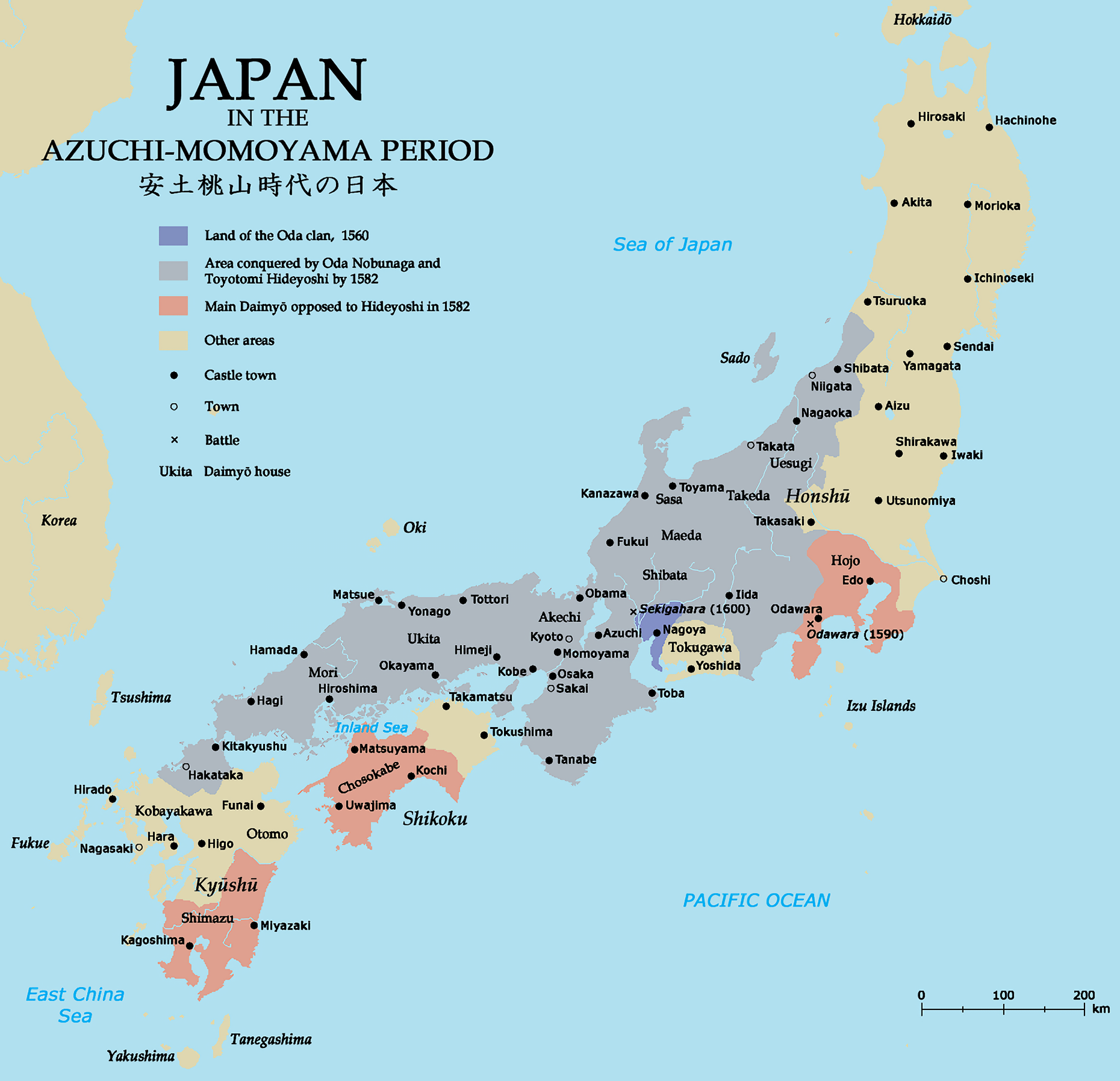
Japan around 1582

In 1583, Hideyoshi began construction of Osaka Castle on the site of the temple Ishiyama Hongan-ji, which had been destroyed by Nobunaga. The main enclosure (honmaru) was finished in 1585 and the second enclosure (ninomaru) by 1588, while work on the outer defenses (sōgamae) continued until Hideyoshi's death. The castle would become the last stronghold of the Toyotomi clan after Hideyoshi's death.

=== Conflict with Katsuie ===
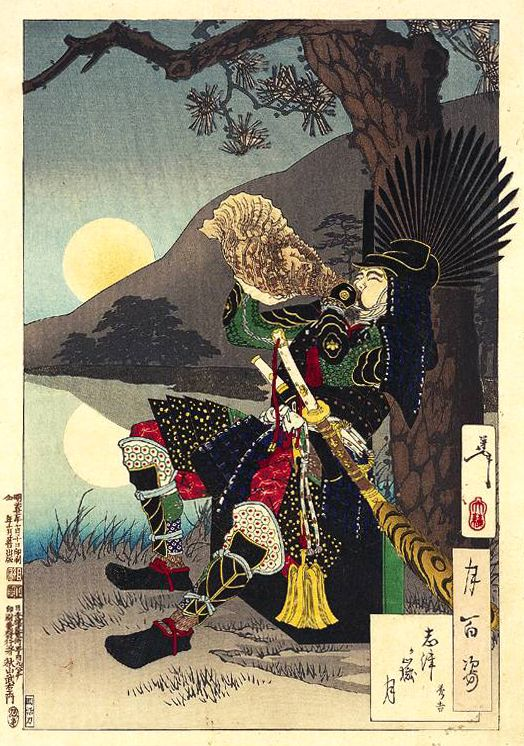
One Hundred Aspects of the Moon No. 67, by Yoshitoshi: The Moon and Hideyoshi at the Battle of Shizugatake.

By mid-1582, Hideyoshi held a commanding position. He summoned the powerful daimyō to Kiyosu Castle on July 16, 1582 (the 27th day of the 6th month of Tenshō 10), so that they could determine Nobunaga's heir. Oda Nobukatsu and Oda Nobutaka quarreled, causing Hideyoshi to instead choose Nobunaga's infant grandson Oda Hidenobu.

Shibata Katsuie initially supported Hideyoshi's decision, but later supported Nobunaga's third son Nobutaka, for whom Katsuie had performed the genpuku ritual. Katsuie allied with Nobutaka and Takigawa Kazumasu against Hideyoshi. Tension quickly escalated between Hideyoshi and Katsuie, and at the Battle of Shizugatake in the following year, Hideyoshi destroyed Katsuie's forces. Hideyoshi had thus consolidated his own power, dealt with most of the Oda clan, and now controlled some 30 provinces.

=== Conflict with Ieyasu ===
In 1584, Nobukatsu allied himself with Tokugawa Ieyasu, and the two sides fought at the Battle of Komaki and Nagakute, which ended in a stalemate, although Hideyoshi's forces suffered heavy losses. Ieyasu and Hideyoshi never fought against each other in person, but Ieyasu checked the advance of Hideyoshi's allies. After Hideyoshi and Ieyasu heard the news of Ikeda Tsuneoki and Mori Nagayoshi's deaths, both withdrew their troops.

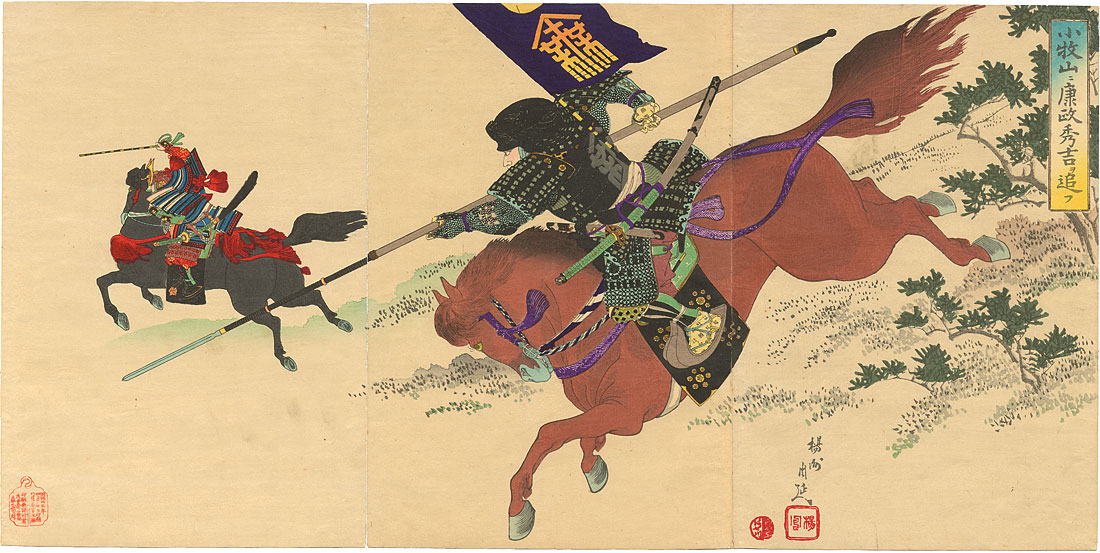
Edo period portrayal of Sakakibara Yasumasa chasing Toyotomi Hideyoshi at Mount Komaki

Following this, Ieyasu's general Sakakibara Yasumasa circulated a derogatory manifesto condemning Hideyoshi's conduct as a betrayal of Nobunaga's wishes and also insulting Hideyoshi's origins. This infuriated Hideyoshi, who offered a reward of 100,000 kan to anyone who could bring him Yasumasa's head. (Note: This story of Yasumasa insulting Hideyoshi first appeared in a work by Arai Hakuseki. Historian Watanabe Daimon stated that it is difficult to confirm the veracity of this story.)

Later, Hideyoshi made peace with Nobukatsu and Ieyasu, ending the pretext for war between the Tokugawa and Hashiba clans. However, Ieyasu continued to refuse to become Hideyoshi's vassal. Hideyoshi was preparing to attack Ieyasu, but the 1586 Tenshō earthquake caused extensive damage across central Japan, destroying his forward base at Ōgaki Castle, and forced Hideyoshi to abandon the campaign against Ieyasu. Hideyoshi sent his younger sister Asahi no kata and mother Ōmandokoro to Tokugawa Ieyasu as hostages. In response, Ieyasu finally traveled to Osaka and expressed his intention to submit to Hideyoshi.

=== Toyotomi clan and Imperial Court appointment ===
Like Oda Nobunaga before him, Hideyoshi never achieved the title of shōgun. Instead, he arranged to have himself adopted by Konoe Sakihisa, one of the highest-ranking members of the Fujiwara clan, and secured a succession of high court titles. These included the prestigious position of Imperial Regent (kampaku) in 1585 and Chancellor (daijō-daijin) in 1586. In 1586, Hideyoshi was formally given the new clan name Toyotomi (instead of Fujiwara) by the Imperial Court. He built a lavish palace in 1587, the Jurakudai, and entertained the reigning Emperor Go-Yōzei the following year.

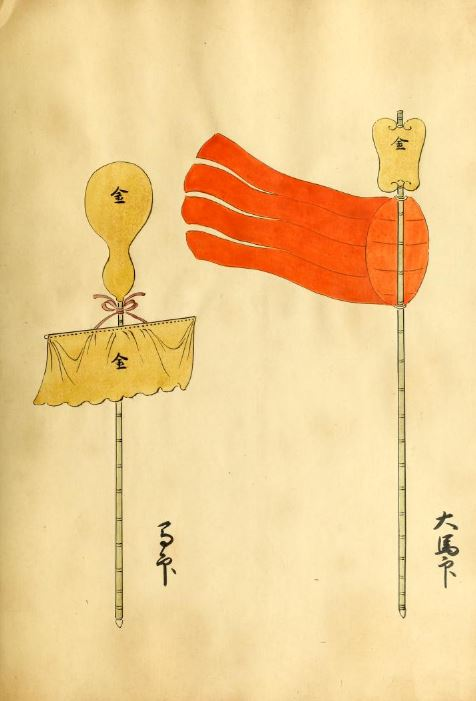
Battle standards of Toyotomi Hideyoshi

== Unification of Japan (1585–1592) ==
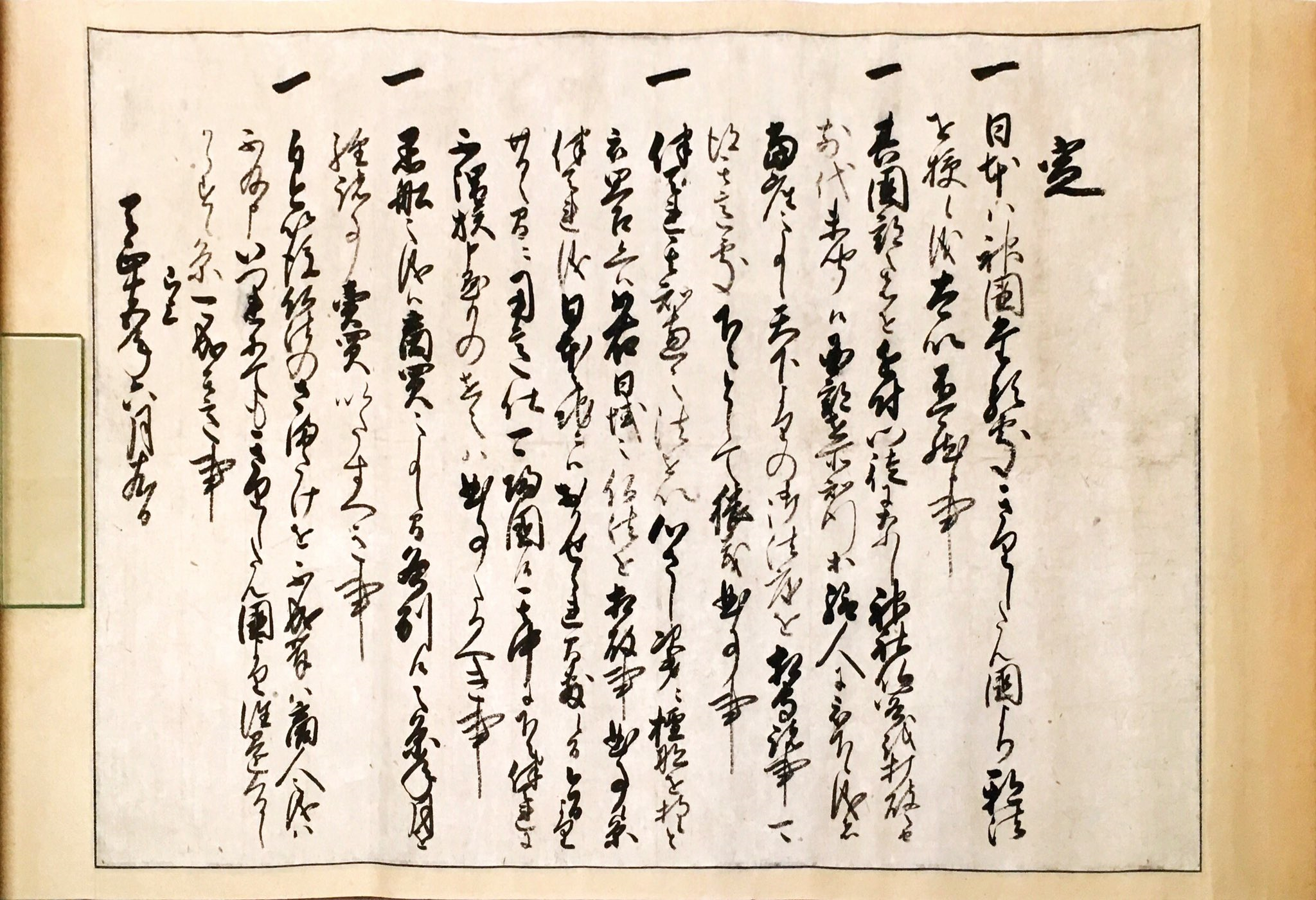
Hideyoshi promulgated a ban on Christianity in the form of the "Bateren-tsuiho-rei" (the Purge Directive Order to the Jesuits) on July 24, 1587.

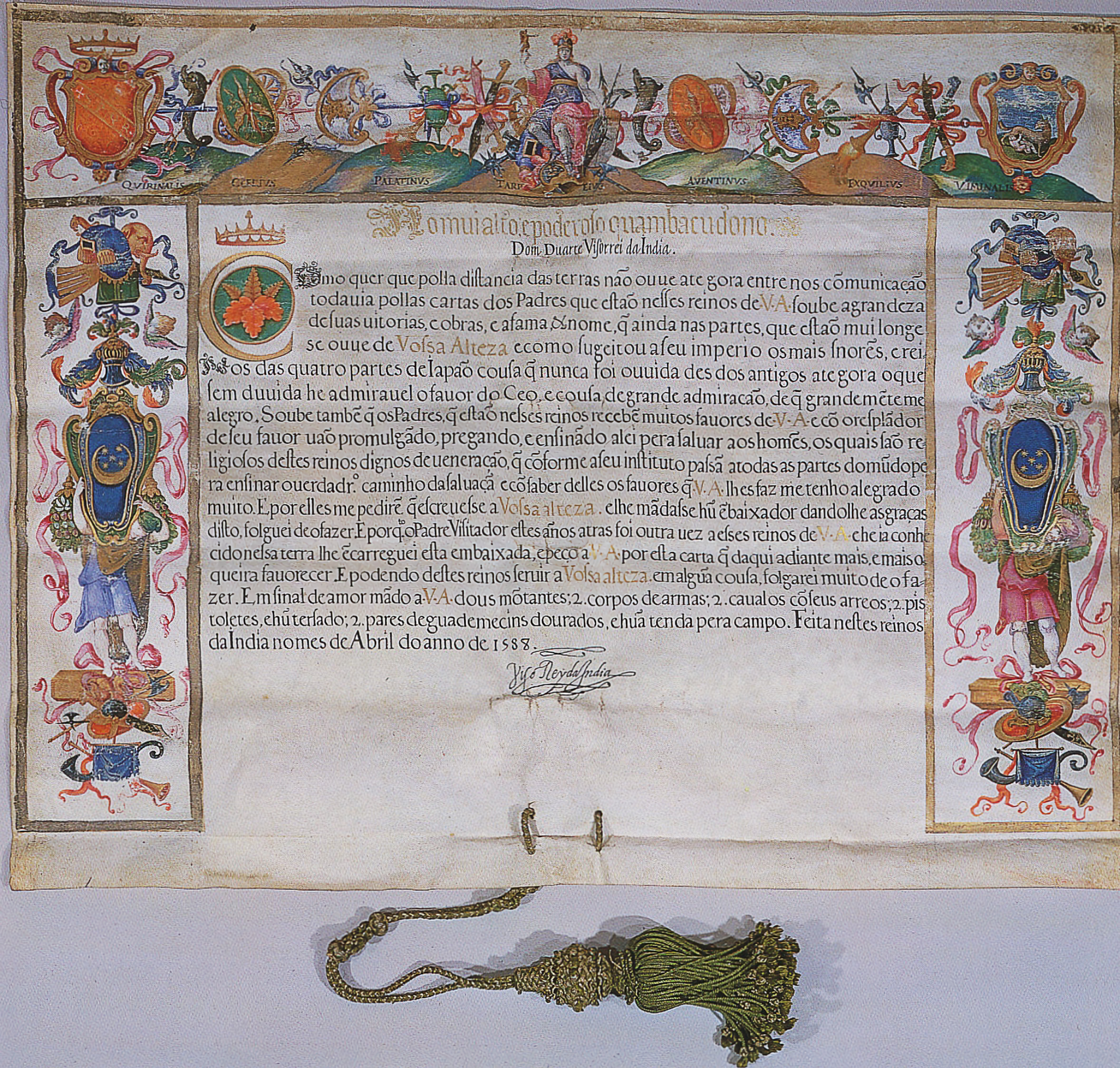
Letter from Duarte de Meneses, Viceroy of Portuguese India, to Hideyoshi dated April 1588, concerning the suppression of Christians, a National Treasure of Japan

In 1585, Hideyoshi launched the Siege of Negoro-ji and subjugated Kii Province. The Negoro-gumi, the warrior monks of Negoro-ji, were allied with the Ikkō-ikki and with Tokugawa Ieyasu, whom they supported in the Battle of Komaki and Nagakute the previous year. After attacking a number of other outposts in the area, Hideyoshi's forces attacked Negoro-ji from two sides. By this time many of the Negoro-gumi had already fled to Ōta Castle, which Hideyoshi later besieged. The complex was set aflame, beginning with the residences of the priests, and Hideyoshi's samurai cut down monks as they escaped the blazing buildings.

In the 1585 Invasion of Shikoku, Toyotomi forces seized Shikoku island, the smallest of Japan's four main islands, from Chōsokabe Motochika. Hideyoshi's forces arrived 113,000 strong under Toyotomi Hidenaga, Toyotomi Hidetsugu, Ukita Hideie, and the Mōri clan under Mōri Terumoto, Kobayakawa Takakage and Kikkawa Motonaga. Chōsokabe fielded 40,000 men. Despite the overwhelming size of Hideyoshi's army, and the suggestions of his advisors, Motochika chose to fight to defend his territories.

In late summer 1585, Hideyoshi launched an attack on Etchū Province and Hida Province where he besieged Toyama Castle.

=== 1586–1588 activities ===
In 1586 Hideyoshi began his campaign to take Kyūshū from the Shimazu clan, sending advance forces under Kuroda Yoshitaka and Sengoku Hidehisa to the island. In 1587, Toyotomi Hidenaga, Hideyoshi's half-brother, landed in the south of Bungo Province on Kyūshū's eastern coast. Meanwhile, Hideyoshi took his own forces down a more western route, in Chikuzen Province. With a total of 200,000 soldiers against the 30,000 men of the Shimazu forces, the two brothers met in Satsuma Province. They besieged Kagoshima Castle, the Shimazu clan's home. The Shimazu surrendered, with Shimazu Yoshihisa submitting to Hideyoshi in the fifth month of 1587.

In 1588, Hideyoshi forbade peasants to own weapons and launched a sword hunt to confiscate all such weapons. The weapons were melted down into building material for the Hall of the Great Buddha at the Hōkō temple in Kyoto, which was built by Hideyoshi. This measure effectively stopped peasant revolts and ensured greater stability at the expense of the freedom of the individual daimyō.

=== Odawara Campaign ===
In 1590, Hideyoshi carried out the Odawara Campaign against the Later Hōjō clan in the Kantō region, in what historian Stephen Turnbull calls "the most unconventional siege lines in samurai history". Hideyoshi's besieging army was entertained by everything from concubines, prostitutes, and musicians to acrobats, fire-eaters, and jugglers. The defenders slept on the ramparts with their teppō and armor; despite their smaller numbers, they discouraged Hideyoshi from attacking. Hideyoshi had Ishigakiyama Ichiya Castle secretly constructed in a nearby forest. During the siege, Hideyoshi offered Ieyasu the eight Hōjō-ruled provinces in the Kantō region in exchange for the submission of Ieyasu's five provinces, which Ieyasu accepted.

In the 10th month of Tenshō 18 (October 29 to November 26, 1590), an uprising broke out in the Yokote Basin, Senboku District (in present-day Akita Prefecture), in opposition to the Taikō land survey conducted by the Toyotomi government. The rebellion was later suppressed, but it proved disastrous for the Onodera clan.

=== 1591 activities ===
In 1591, Hideyoshi ordered Sen no Rikyū to commit suicide, possibly in a fit of anger. Rikyū died on April 21, 1591 (the 28th day of the 2nd month of Tenshō 19). Following Rikyū's death, Hideyoshi turned his attention from tea ceremony to Noh, which he had been studying since becoming Imperial Regent. During his brief stay in Hizen-Nagoya Castle in what is today Saga Prefecture, on Kyūshū, Hideyoshi memorized the shite (lead role) parts of ten Noh plays, which he then performed, forcing various daimyō to accompany him onstage as the waki (secondary, accompanying role). He even performed before the emperor.

The Kunohe rebellion, an insurrection that occurred in Mutsu Province from the spring of 1591 until October 21, 1591 (the 4th day of the 9th month of Tenshō 19), began when Kunohe Masazane, a claimant to leadership of the Nanbu clan, launched a rebellion against his rival Nanbu Nobunao which spread across Mutsu Province. Nobunao was backed by Hideyoshi, who sent a large army into the Tōhoku region in mid-1591 which quickly defeated the rebels. Hideyoshi's army arrived at Kunohe Castle in early September. Masazane, outnumbered, surrendered Kunohe Castle and was executed with the castle defenders. The Kunohe rebellion was the final battle in Hideyoshi's campaigns during the Sengoku period and completed the unification of Japan.

== Taikō (1592–1598) ==
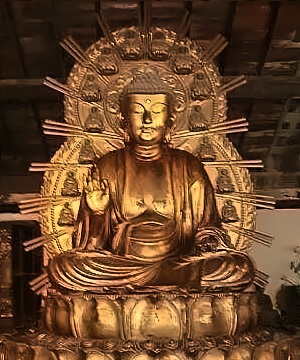
Replica of Great Buddha of Kyoto. The Great Buddha of Kyoto was built by Hideyoshi to show off his power.

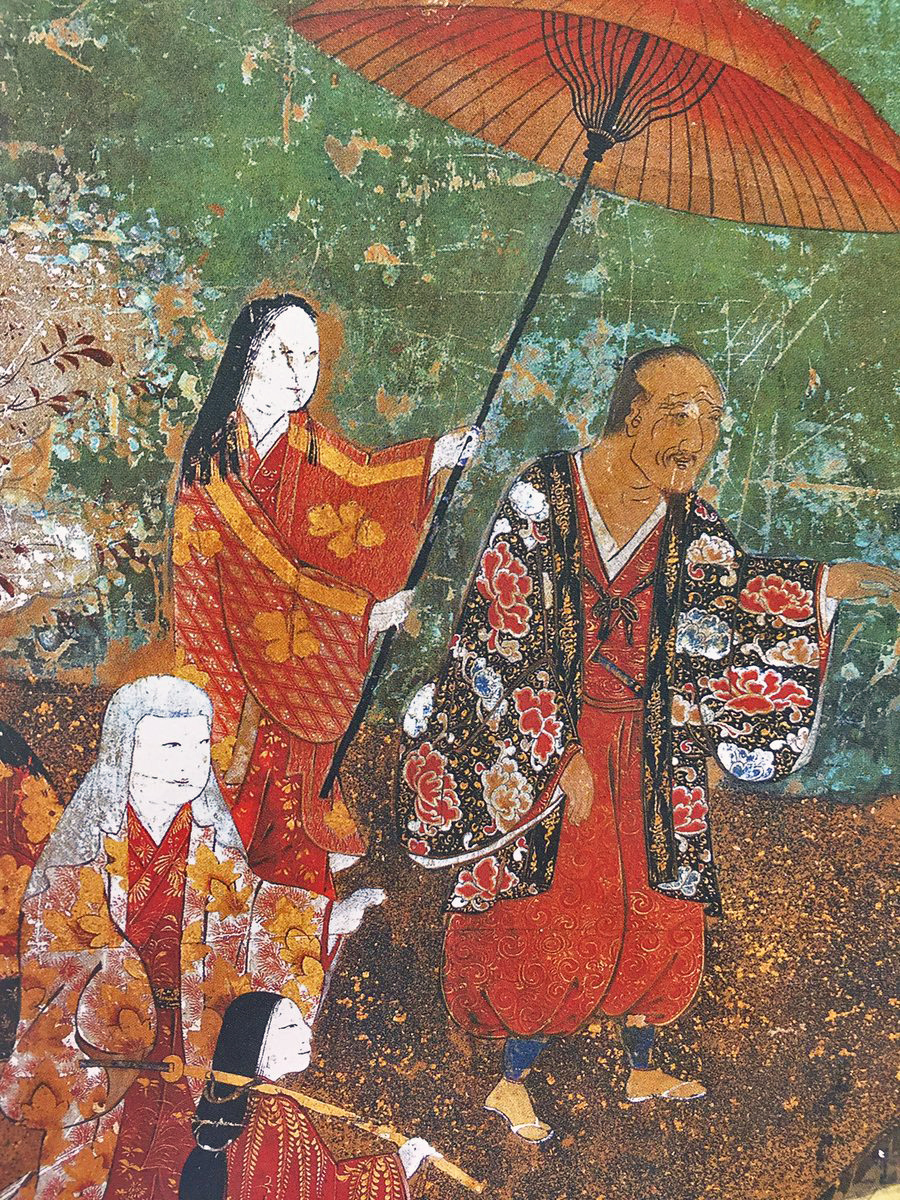
Toyotomi Hideyoshi and his wife Kōdai-in attended the flower viewing.

The future stability of the Toyotomi dynasty after Hideyoshi's eventual death was put in doubt when his only son, three-year-old Tsurumatsu, died in September 1591, which followed his half-brother Hidenaga's death from illness earlier that year in February. Hideyoshi subsequently named his nephew Hidetsugu his heir, adopting him in January 1592. Hideyoshi resigned as kampaku to take the title of taikō (retired regent), and Hidetsugu succeeded him as kampaku.

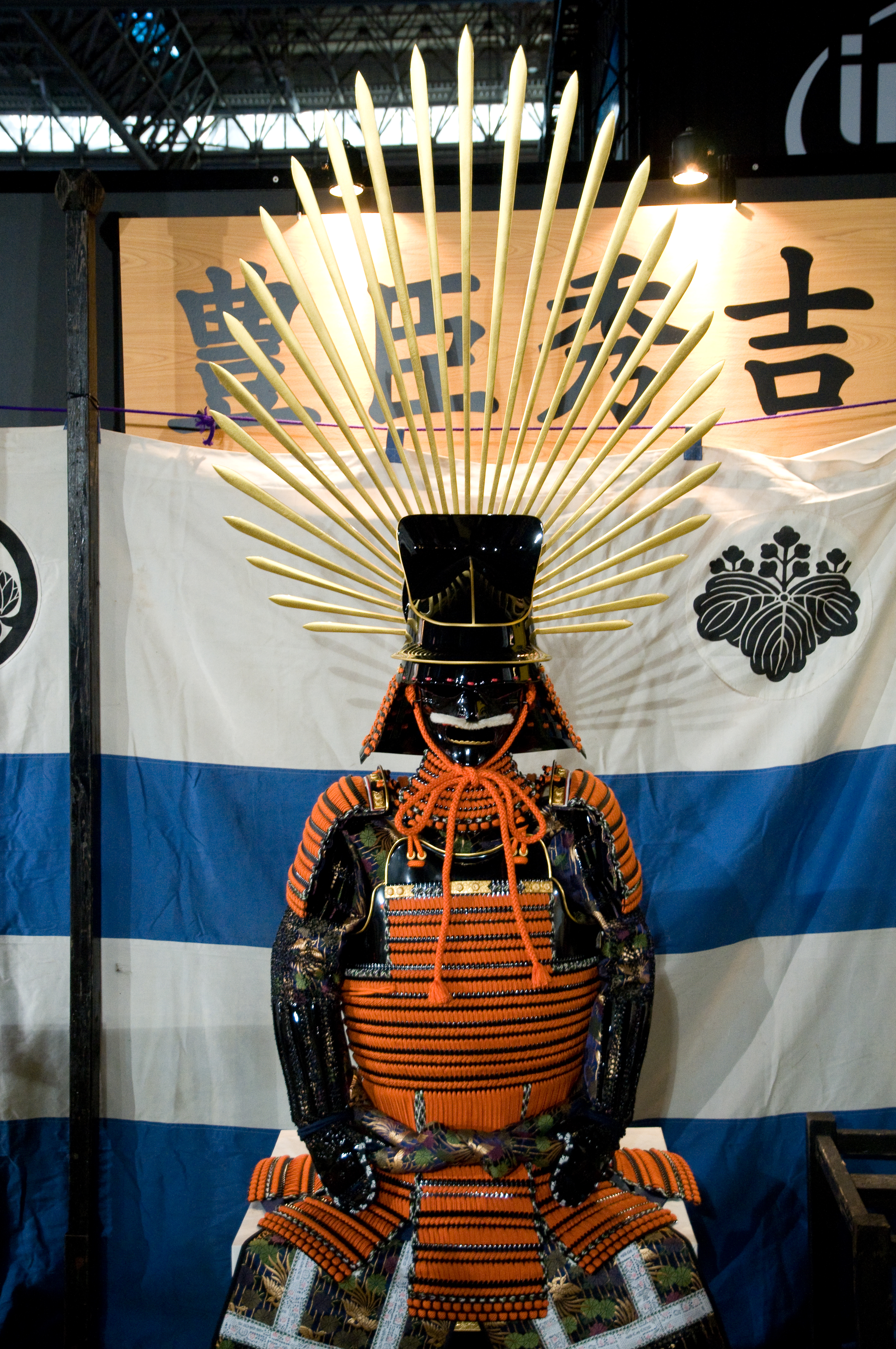
Replica of Toyotomi Hideyoshi's armor

Hideyoshi adopted Oda Nobunaga's dream of a Japanese conquest of China, and launched the conquest of the Ming dynasty by way of Korea (then Joseon).

In 1592, Hideyoshi began an invasion of Korea with the intent of conquering Korea and eventually Ming China. In 1593, he tried and failed to compel Taiwan into a tributary relationship. Hideyoshi's explicit war goal was for Japan to replace China at the top of the international order. Hideyoshi wrote to his adopted son Hidetsugu that "it is not Ming China alone that is destined to be subjugated by us, but India, the Philippines, and many islands in the South Sea will share a like fate."

=== First campaign against Korea ===
In the first campaign, Hideyoshi appointed Ukita Hideie as field marshal and sent him to the Korean Peninsula in April 1592. Konishi Yukinaga occupied Seoul, which was the capital of Joseon, on June 19. After Seoul fell, Japanese commanders held a war council there in June and determined targets of subjugation called Hachidō kuniwari (八道国割, "division of the eight provinces"). Each targeted province was attacked by one of the army's eight divisions:

- Pyeongan Province by the First Division led by Konishi Yukinaga.
- Hamgyong Province by the Second Division led by Katō Kiyomasa.
- Hwanghae Province by the Third Division led by Kuroda Nagamasa.
- Gangwon Province by the Fourth Division led by Mōri Katsunaga.
- Chungcheong Province by the Fifth Division led by Fukushima Masanori.
- Jeolla Province by the Sixth Division led by Kobayakawa Takakage.
- Gyeongsang Province by the Seventh Division led by Mōri Terumoto.
- Gyeonggi Province by the Eighth Division led by Ukita Hideie.

Within four months, Hideyoshi's forces had reached the border of Manchuria and had occupied much of Korea. The Korean king Seonjo of Joseon escaped to Uiju and requested military intervention from China. In 1593, the Wanli Emperor of Ming China sent an army under General Li Rusong to block the planned Japanese invasion of China and recapture the Korean peninsula. On January 7, 1593, the Ming relief forces recaptured Pyongyang and surrounded Seoul, but Kobayakawa Takakage, Ukita Hideie, Tachibana Muneshige and Kikkawa Hiroie were able to win the Battle of Byeokjegwan north of Seoul (now Goyang). At the end of the first campaign, Japan's entire navy was destroyed by Admiral Yi Sun-sin of Korea, whose base was located in a part of Korea the Japanese could not control. This destroyed Japan's ability to resupply its troops in Seoul, effectively ending the invasion.

=== Succession dispute ===
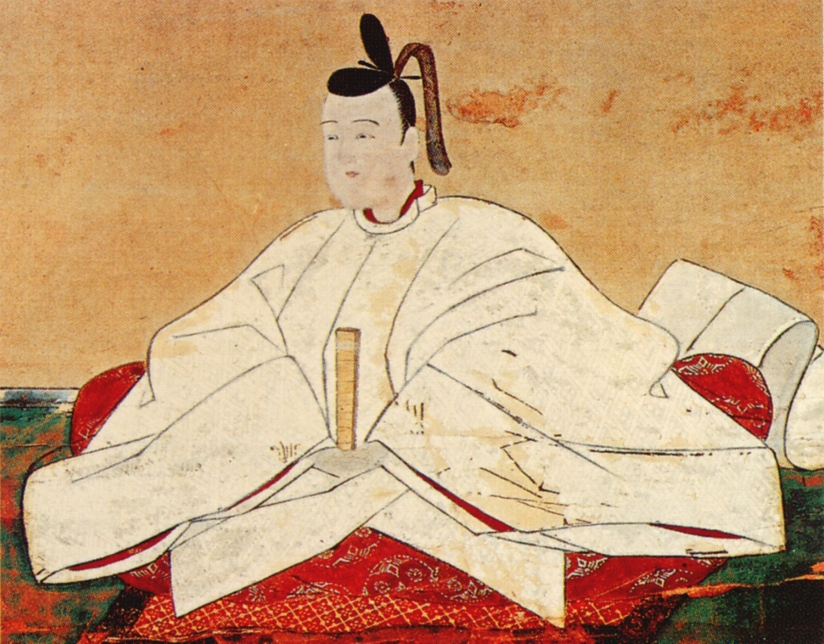
Toyotomi Hideyori

Following Hideyoshi's appointment of his nephew Hidetsugu to the position of kampaku, tensions developed from the dual power structure between Hidetsugu, who led the court system, and Hideyoshi, who retained actual military power as retired regent. Although Hideyoshi orchestrated Hidetsugu's rise, the regent's position was governed by established court frameworks, limiting Hideyoshi's ability to bypass precedents. This led to the formation of two factions: the "Taikō (Hideyoshi's) group" and the "kampaku (Hidetsugu's) group," which clashed over political and military issues.

The birth of Hideyoshi's second son, Hideyori, in 1593 exacerbated these tensions, as it introduced another potential heir to the Toyotomi dynasty. In August 1595, amidst suspicions of treason and the ongoing Korean invasion, Hidetsugu was stripped of his titles, exiled to Mount Kōya, and ordered to commit suicide, which he did on August 20, 1595 (the 15th day of the 7th month of Bunroku 4). Hideyoshi then had members of Hidetsugu's family, including 31 women and several children, executed by beheading in Kyoto. In the aftermath, Hideyoshi solidified his authority by securing loyalty oaths, signed in blood, from magistrates and daimyō, including Tokugawa Ieyasu, Maeda Toshiie, Ukita Hideie, Mōri Terumoto, and Kobayakawa Takakage.

=== Second campaign against Korea ===
Peace negotiations dragged on for several years. Konishi Yukinaga and the Ming envoy Shen Weijing forged Hideyoshi's memorial to the Ming court, and on that basis the Ming agreed to invest him as "King of Japan". When the deception came to light during Hideyoshi's audience with the Ming envoys at Osaka Castle in 1596, he was enraged, and in 1597 he appointed Kobayakawa Hideaki to lead a renewed invasion of Korea. This invasion met with less success than the first; Japanese troops remained pinned down in Gyeongsang Province, and although the Japanese forces turned back several Chinese offensives in Suncheon and Sacheon in the autumn of 1598, they were unable to make further progress as the Ming army prepared for a final assault. While the Battle of Sacheon, led by Shimazu Yoshihiro, was a major Japanese victory, all three parties to the war were exhausted. Hideyoshi told his commander in Korea, "Don't let my soldiers become spirits in a foreign land."

== Death ==
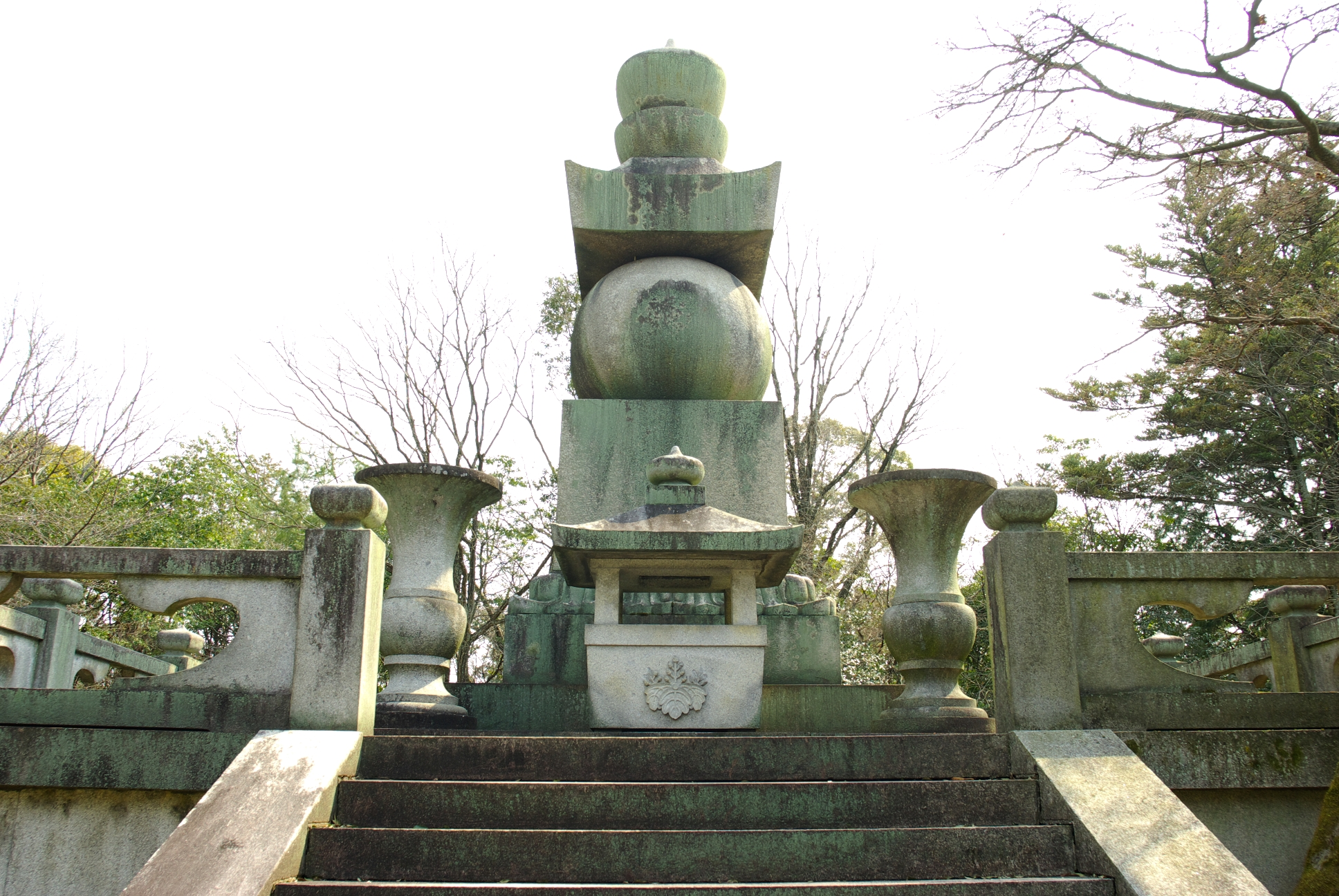
Houkokubyo (Mausoleum of Toyotomi Hideyoshi) Higashiyama-ku, Kyoto

Toyotomi Hideyoshi died at Fushimi Castle on September 18, 1598 (Keichō 3, 18th day of the 8th month). His last words, delivered to his closest daimyō and generals, were "I depend upon you for everything. I have no other thoughts to leave behind. It is sad to part from you." His death was kept secret by the Council of Five Elders to preserve morale, and they ordered Japanese forces in Korea to return to Japan.

According to the Tokugawa Jikki record, Hideyoshi held a secret meeting with Koide Hidemasa and Katagiri Katsumoto where he shared his regret about launching invasions of Korea. Hideyoshi also instructed Hidemasa and Katsumoto to guide Hideyori into making an alliance with Ieyasu, as he predicted the power of the Tokugawa clan would grow unchecked after his death, and the only solution for the Toyotomi clan to survive was to not oppose Ieyasu.

After Hideyoshi's death, the other members of the Council of Five Elders were unable to keep Ieyasu's ambitions in check. Two of Hideyoshi's top generals, Katō Kiyomasa and Fukushima Masanori, had served in Korea but returned to find the Toyotomi clan castellan Ishida Mitsunari in power. He held the generals in contempt, and they sided with Ieyasu. Hideyori lost the power his father once held, and Ieyasu's power was consolidated when his Eastern Army defeated Mitsunari's Western Army at the Battle of Sekigahara in 1600. Ieyasu, who was appointed shōgun in 1603 and established the Tokugawa shogunate, attacked Osaka Castle twice in 1614 and 1615 (the Siege of Osaka), forcing Hideyoshi's concubine Yodo-dono and Hideyori to commit suicide. Their deaths ended the Toyotomi clan.

Historians generally attribute the weakening of the Toyotomi regime and its eventual downfall mainly to Hideyoshi's loss of all his adult heirs, which left only the five-year-old Hideyori as his successor.

== Family ==
- Father: Kinoshita Yaemon (d. 1543)
  - Adopted father: Konoe Sakihisa (1536–1612)
- Mother: Ōmandokoro (1513–1592)
  - Siblings:
    - Toyotomi Hidenaga (1540–1591)
    - Tomo (1534–1625), married Soeda Jinbae
    - Asahi no kata (1543–1590), married first Soeda Oshinari then Tokugawa Ieyasu

=== Wives and concubines ===
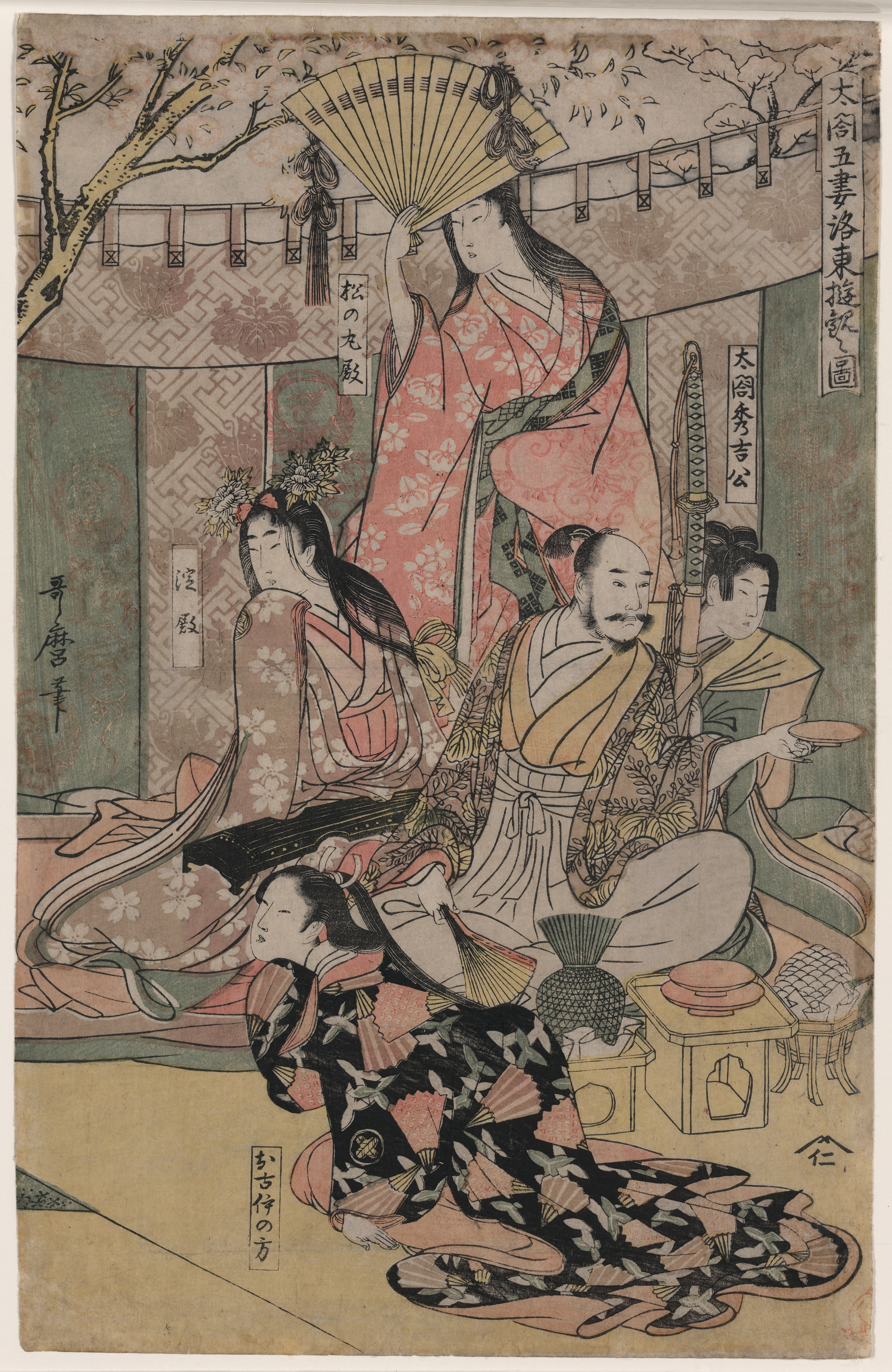
Hideyoshi sitting with his wives and concubines

- Wife Nene (1541/1549 – 1624), or One, later Kōdai-in
- Minami-dono, daughter of Yamana Toyokuni
- Yodo-dono (1569–1615), or Chacha, later Daikōin, daughter of Azai Nagamasa
- Minami no Tsubone, daughter of Yamana Toyokuni
- Kyōgoku Tatsuko, daughter of Kyōgoku Takayoshi
- Kaga-dono or Maahime, daughter of Maeda Toshiie
- Kaihime, daughter of Narita Ujinaga
- Sonnomaru-dono, adopted daughter of Gamō Ujisato, daughter of Oda Nobunaga
- Kusu no Tsubone, later Hokoin, daughter of Azai Nagamasa
- Sanjo-dono or Tora, daughter of Gamō Katahide
- Himeji-dono, daughter of Oda Nobukane
- Hirozawa no Tsubone, daughter of Kunimitsu Kyosho
- Ōshima or Shimako, later Gekkein, daughter of Ashikaga Yorizumi
- Anrunkin or Otane no Kata
- Ofuku, later Enyu-in, daughter of Miura Noto no Kami and mother of Ukita Hideie

=== Children ===
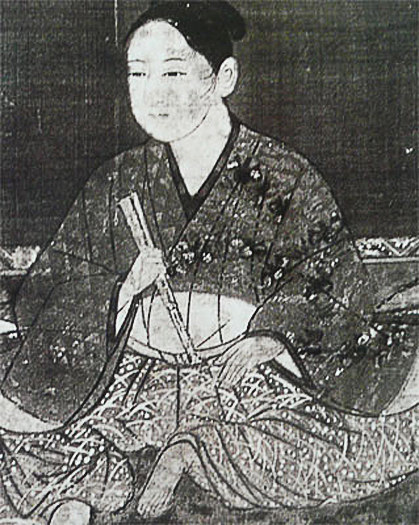
Hashiba Hidekatsu (Ishimatsumaru)

- Hashiba Hidekatsu (Ishimatsumaru) (1570–1576) by Minami-dono
- daughter (name unknown) by Minami-dono

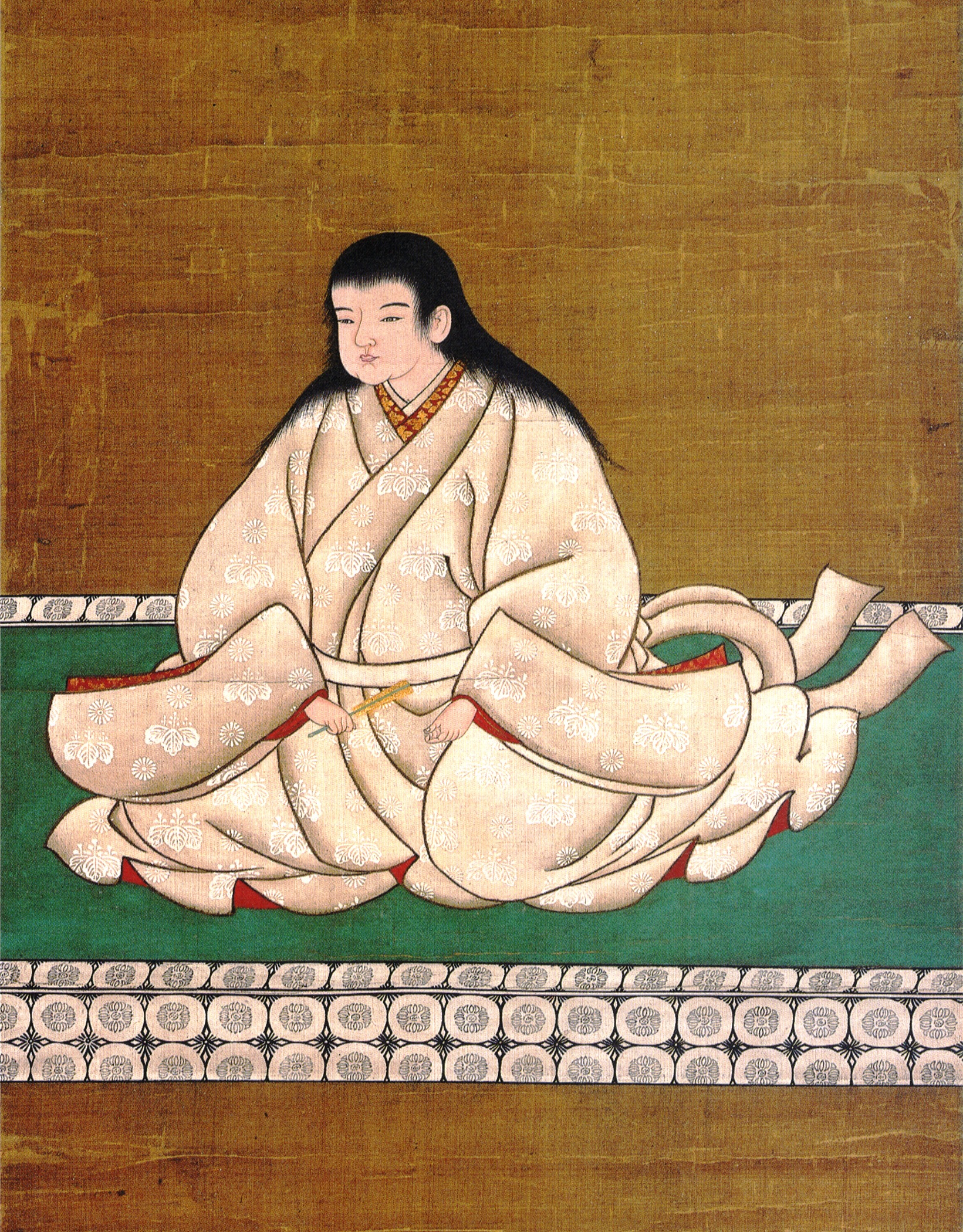
Tsurumatsu

- Toyotomi Tsurumatsu (1589–1591) by Yodo-dono
- Toyotomi Hideyori (1593–1615) by Yodo-dono

=== Adopted sons ===
- Hashiba Hidekatsu (Otsugimaru) (1567–1586), fourth son of Oda Nobunaga
- Oda Nobutaka, later Toyotomi Takahiro (1576–1602), seventh son of Oda Nobunaga
- Oda Nobuyoshi, later Toyotomi Musashi (1573–1615), eighth son of Oda Nobunaga
- Oda Nobuyoshi (d. 1609), tenth son of Oda Nobunaga
- Ukita Hideie (1572–1655), son of Ukita Naoie
- Toyotomi Hidetsugu (1568–1595), first son of Hideyoshi's sister Tomo with Miyoshi Kazumichi
- Toyotomi Hidekatsu (1569–1592), second son of Hideyoshi's sister Tomo with Miyoshi Kazumichi
- Toyotomi Hideyasu (1579–1595), third son of Hideyoshi's sister Tomo with Miyoshi Kazumichi
- Yūki Hideyasu (1574–1607), Tokugawa Ieyasu's second son
- Ikeda Nagayoshi, third son of Ikeda Nobuteru
- Kobayakawa Hideaki (1577–1602), Hideyoshi's nephew from his wife Nene's family
- Prince Hachijō Toshihito (1579–1629), sixth son of Prince Masahito

=== Adopted daughters ===
- Gohime (1574–1634), daughter of Maeda Toshiie, married Ukita Hideie
- O-hime (1585–1591), daughter of Oda Nobukatsu, married Tokugawa Hidetada
- Oeyo (1573–1626), daughter of Azai Nagamasa, married Saji Kazunari, Toyotomi Hidekatsu, Tokugawa Hidetada
- Konoe Sakiko (1575–1630), daughter of Konoe Sakihisa, married Emperor Go-Yōzei
- Chikurin-in (1579/80–1649), daughter of Ōtani Yoshitsugu. She was also known as Akihime and Riyohime. She was married to Sanada Yukimura. They had two sons, Sanada Daisuke and Sanada Daihachi, and several daughters.
- Toyotomi Sadako (1592–1658), daughter of Toyotomi Hidekatsu with Oeyo, later became the adopted daughter of Tokugawa Hidetada and married Kujō Yukiie
- Daizen-in, daughter of Toyotomi Hidenaga, married Mōri Hidemoto
- Kikuhime, daughter of Toyotomi Hidenaga, married Toyotomi Hideyasu
- Maeda Kikuhime (1578–1584), daughter of Maeda Toshiie

=== Grandchildren ===
- Toyotomi Kunimatsu (1608–1615)
- Tenshuni (天秀尼) (1609–1645)

== Character and policy analysis ==
Described as a "hitotarashi" (a person with natural charisma or a master charmer), Hideyoshi was skilled at winning people over and mastering human psychology. This won him the regard of both his superiors and his subordinates, and led some opposing warlords to surrender after meeting him in person. According to Japanese historian Watanabe Daimon, Hideyoshi had a deep inferiority complex which influenced his behavior after he became regent, as he often toyed with or pranked his vassals. This behavior may have stemmed from his humble origin and experiences during Nobunaga's lifetime, such as not being permitted to ride alongside other generals from the samurai class and being required to dismount before bowing.

=== Religious policy ===
In 1587, while trying to establish control in some parts of Kyūshū, Hideyoshi encountered Buddhist temples that, according to the historian Paul E. Eckel, had been sacked by Catholic forces attempting to forcibly convert the island. In response, he issued the Bateren Edict (Note: Bateren is derived from the Latin patrem, which means father in the accusative case, or the Portuguese word padre) on the 19th day of the sixth month of Tenshō 15 (July 24, 1587, in the Gregorian calendar), which ordered the expulsion of Christian missionaries from Japan. Promulgated during Hideyoshi's campaign to unify Kyūshū, the edict was a response to several perceived threats posed by Christianity, to exert greater control over the Kirishitan daimyō or to prohibit human trafficking. According to the historian Arata Harumasa, at least 50,000 Japanese people were sold overseas as slaves around that time, mainly by Portuguese merchants. This stance was further shown in Hideyoshi's letter sent on July 25, 1590, to Alessandro Valignano, the contents of which are similar to those of a letter he sent to the ruler of Joseon. In those letters, Hideyoshi expressed his view that Indian Buddhism, Chinese Confucianism, and Japanese Shinto are fundamentally one unit, while also warning that he would no longer tolerate the propagation of Christianity ("evil religion" in Hideyoshi's letter), and that he would no longer allow Christian missionaries to enter the country, though he still allowed merchants from Europe (Nanban) to enter and trade.

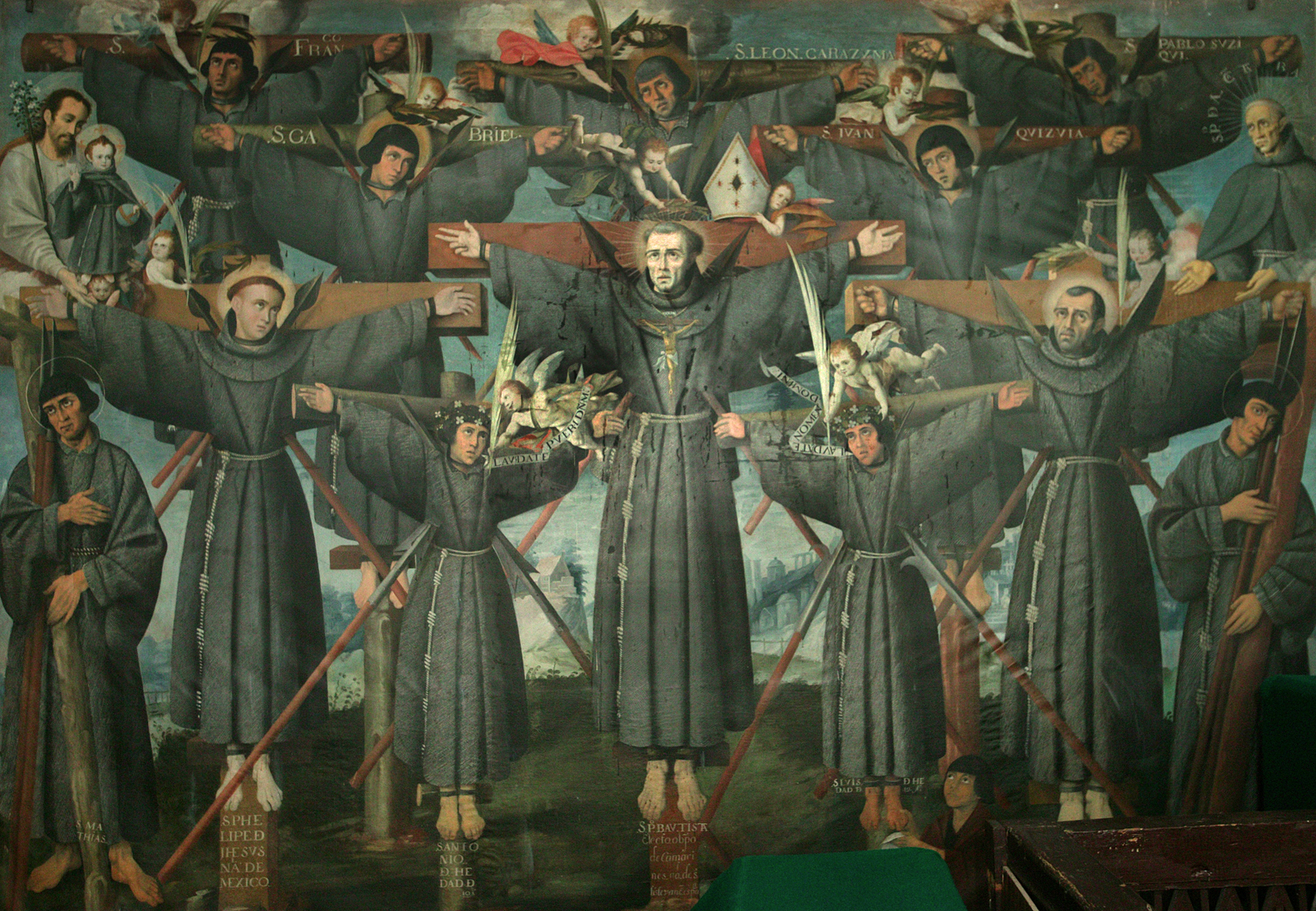
The 26 Christian martyrs of Nagasaki, 18–19th century, Choir of La Recoleta, Cuzco

In late 1596, Toyotomi Hideyoshi had twenty-six Christians arrested as a warning to Japanese who wanted to convert to Christianity. They are known as the Twenty-six Martyrs of Japan. They included five European Franciscan missionaries, one Mexican Franciscan missionary, three Japanese Jesuits and seventeen Japanese laymen including three young boys. They were tortured, mutilated, and paraded through towns across Japan. On February 5, they were executed in Nagasaki by public crucifixion.

== Legacy ==
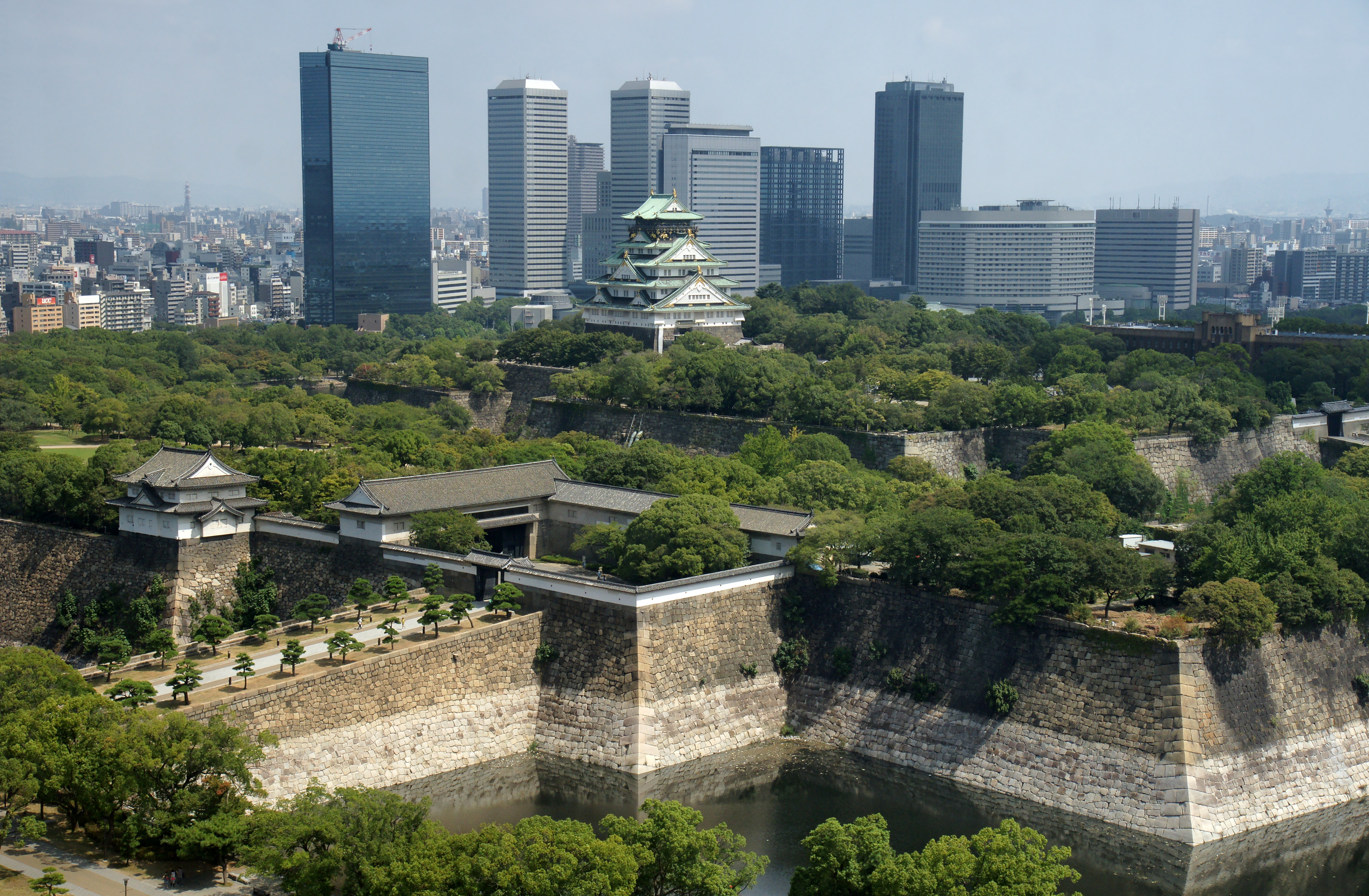
A replicated Osaka Castle has been created on the site of Hideyoshi's great donjon. The iconic castle has become a symbol of Osaka's re-emergence as a great city after its devastation in World War II.

By August 18, 1915, Hideyoshi had been posthumously raised to Senior First Rank.

Toyotomi Hideyoshi changed Japanese society in many ways. These include the imposition of a rigid class structure, restrictions on travel, and surveys of land and production.

Class reforms affected commoners and warriors. During the Sengoku period, the lack of central government and the constant threat of war had made it common for peasants to become warriors and for samurai to farm. Upon taking control, Hideyoshi decreed that peasants be disarmed. Conversely, he required samurai to leave the land and take up residence in the castle towns.

Furthermore, he ordered comprehensive surveys and a complete census of Japan. Once this was done and all inhabitants were registered, he required all Japanese to stay in their respective han (fiefs) unless they obtained official permission to go elsewhere. This helped maintain order in a period when bandits still roamed the countryside and peace was still new. The land surveys formed the basis for systematic taxation.

Hideyoshi built Osaka Castle to guard the western approaches to Kyoto. In 1590, Hideyoshi banned "unfree labor" or slavery in Japan, but forms of contract and indentured labor persisted alongside the period penal codes' forced labor.

Hideyoshi also influenced the material culture of Japan. He lavished time and money on the Japanese tea ceremony, collecting implements, sponsoring elaborate social events, and patronizing acclaimed masters. As interest in the tea ceremony rose among the ruling class, so too did the demand for fine ceramic implements, and during the course of the Korean campaigns, not only were large quantities of prized ceramic ware confiscated but many Korean artisans were forcibly relocated to Japan.

Inspired by the Golden Pavilion in Kyoto, he had the Golden Tea Room constructed, which was covered with gold leaf and lined inside with red gossamer. Because the room was portable, he could practice the tea ceremony wherever he went, displaying his power and status at all times.

Politically, he set up a governmental system that balanced the most powerful Japanese warlords (or daimyō). A council was created to include the most influential lords. At the same time, a regent was designated to be in command.

Just before his death, Hideyoshi hoped to set up a system stable enough to survive until his son grew old enough to become the next leader.

Ieyasu left in place the majority of Hideyoshi's decrees and built his shogunate upon them. This ensured that Hideyoshi's cultural legacy remained. In a letter to his wife, Hideyoshi wrote:

I mean to do glorious deeds and I am ready for a long siege, with provisions and gold and silver in plenty, so as to return in triumph and leave a great name behind me. I desire you to understand this and to tell it to everybody.

== Names ==
Contemporary Catholic sources referred to him as Cuambacondono (from kampaku and the honorific -dono) and "emperor Taicosama" (from taikō, a retired kampaku (see Sesshō and Kampaku), and the honorific -sama).

== In popular culture ==
=== Films ===
In the 1949 Mexican hagiographic film Philip of Jesus, Luis Aceves Castañeda plays a character corresponding to Hideyoshi but named "Emperor Iroyoshi Taikosama".

In the 2009 Japanese historical fantasy film Goemon, Toyotomi Hideyoshi (played by Eiji Okuda) is the principal antagonist of the protagonist, Ishikawa Goemon. The film draws on the tradition that Goemon was executed in 1594 for a failed attempt to assassinate Hideyoshi, but otherwise departs freely from both history and tradition: its Goemon kills Hideyoshi and avenges Oda Nobunaga, whereas tradition has him serving Nobunaga's enemies and attempting to kill both men.

Hideyoshi is portrayed by actor/director Takeshi Kitano in his 2023 film Kubi.

=== Anime ===
In the anime series Great Pretender (2020), Hideyoshi is referenced many times by Laurent Thierry, one of the central protagonists of the series.

=== Documentary ===
In the Netflix documentary series Age of Samurai: Battle for Japan (2021), Hideyoshi is portrayed by Masami Kosaka. The show depicts his life and rise to power.

=== Television ===
Actor Naoto Takenaka portrays Toyotomi Hideyoshi in the 1996 NHK drama Hideyoshi, which shows his life from his time under Oda Nobunaga to his rise as a leader himself who helped to unify Japan. It earned an average TV rating of 30.5% running from January 7 – December 22, 1996. He respirsed his role in 2014 Taiga drama Gunshi Kanbei Additionally, actor Yukijirō Hotaru plays the Taikō (Nakamura Hidetoshi), a character based on Toyotomi Hideyoshi, in the 2024 miniseries Shōgun.

=== Video games ===
- Toyotomi Hideyoshi is a playable and non-playable character in Koei Tecmo's Samurai Warriors series and Nobunaga's Ambition series. Both series follow historical events of the late Sengoku period.
- Toyotomi Hideyoshi appears in Civilization VII as a leader, added in the Brush and Blade Collection DLC.
- Toyotomi Hideyoshi appears in Stronghold: Warlords as an AI lord.
- Naoto Takenaka, who played Hideyoshi in the 1996 NHK drama, reprised the role in Nioh 2.

== See also ==
- Itsukushima's Senjokaku Hall
- Sorori Shinzaemon
- Dom Justo Takayama
- Bateren Edict
- Imjin War
- Endoji Shopping Arcade Statues

== Appendix ==
=== Bibliography ===
- Kazuhiro Marushima (丸島和洋) (2015). "北条・徳川間外交の意思伝達構造" [The structure of communication in diplomacy between the Hojo and Tokugawa]. 国文学研究資料館紀要. 11 (11). 国文学研究資料館. doi:10.24619/00001469. ISSN 1880-2249.
- Berry, Mary Elizabeth. (1982). Hideyoshi. Cambridge: Harvard UP, ISBN 978-0674390256; OCLC 8195691
- Haboush, JaHyun Kim. (2016) The Great East Asian War and the Birth of the Korean Nation (2016) excerpt
- Hirayama, Yū (2015). 天正壬午の乱 [Tensho-Jingo war] (増補改訂版 ed.). 戎光祥出版. ISBN 978-4-86403-170-7.
- Jansen, Marius B. (2000). The Making of Modern Japan. Cambridge: Harvard UP. ISBN 978-0674003347; OCLC 44090600
- Joly, H. L., Legend in Japanese Art, London, 1908.
- Nussbaum, Louis-Frédéric and Käthe Roth. (2005). Japan encyclopedia. Cambridge: Harvard University Press. ISBN 978-0-674-01753-5; OCLC 58053128
- Thornton, S. A., The Japanese Period Film: A Critical Analysis, Jefferson, NC, 2008.

Regnal titles
Preceded by Konoe Sakihisa	Kampaku; 1585–1591	Succeeded by Toyotomi Hidetsugu
Government offices
Preceded by Fujiwara no Sakihisa	Daijō Daijin; 1585–1591	Succeeded by Tokugawa Ieyasu
