= Toyotomi Hidetsugu =

Japanese daimyō (1568–1595)

- 豊臣 秀次
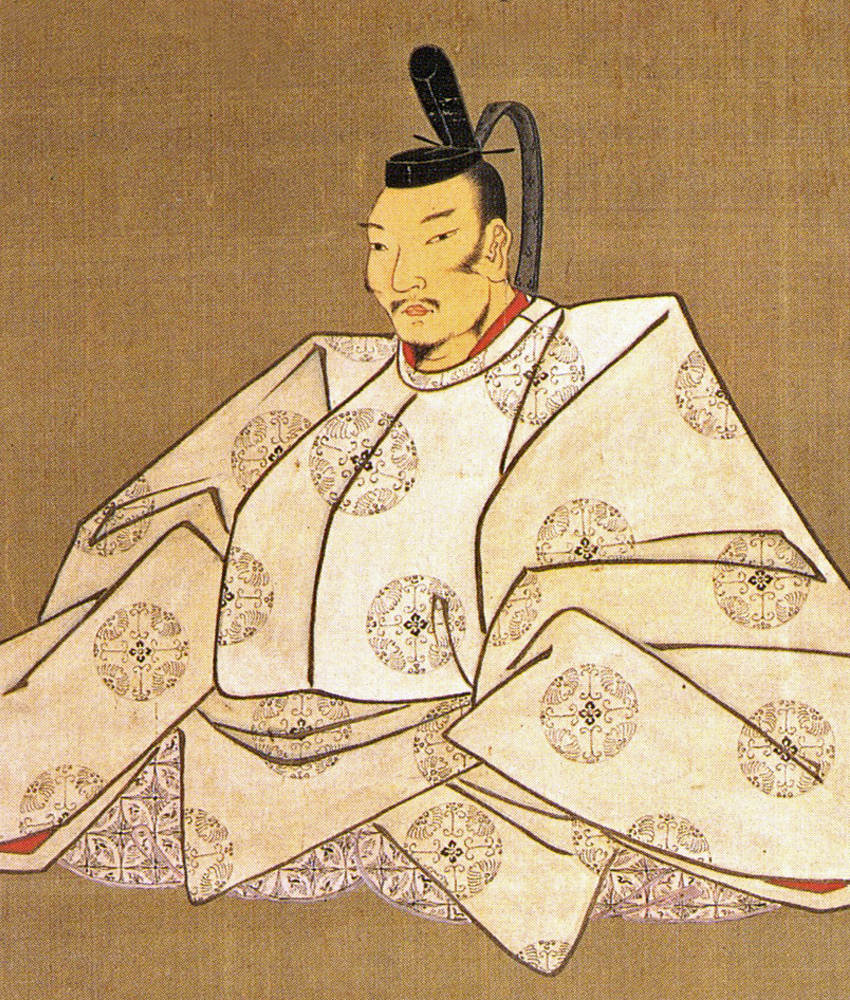

Imperial Regent of Japan
- In office 1585–1591
- Monarch: Go-Yōzei
- Preceded by: Toyotomi Hideyoshi
- Succeeded by: Kujō Kanetaka

Personal details
- Born: Miyoshi Nobuyoshi; 1568 Chita District, Owari Province, Japan (current Chita District, Aichi, Japan)
- Died: August 20, 1595 (aged 26–27)
- Parents: Miyoshi Kazumichi (father); Tomo (mother)
- Relatives: Toyotomi Hideyoshi (uncle); Toyotomi Hidenaga (uncle); Toyotomi Hideyori (cousin); Toyotomi Hidekatsu (brother)
- Other names: Hashiba Hidetsugu
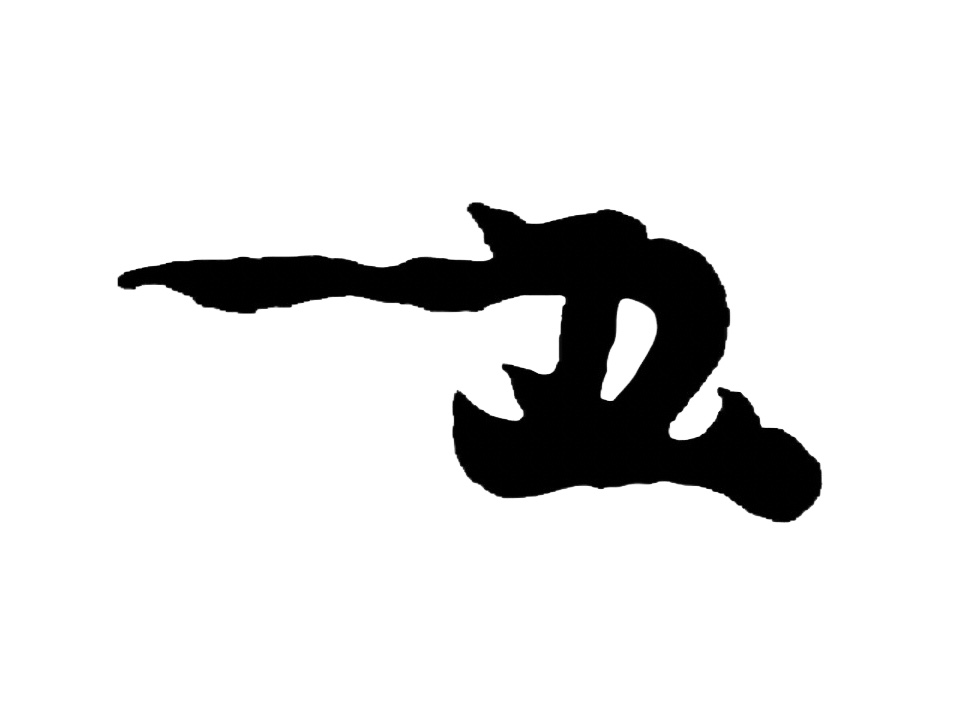
- Signature

Military service
- Allegiance: Toyotomi clan
- Battles/wars: Battle of Shizugatake (1583); Battle of Komaki (1584); Invasion of Shikoku (1585); Siege of Odawara (1590); Kunohe rebellion (1591)

Toyotomi Hidetsugu (豊臣 秀次; 1568 – August 20, 1595) was a daimyō during the Sengoku period of Japan. He was the nephew and retainer of Toyotomi Hideyoshi, the unifier and ruler of Japan from 1590 to 1598. Despite being Hideyoshi's closest adult, male relative, Hidetsugu was accused of atrocities and attempting to stage a coup after the birth of Hideyoshi's son, and he was ordered to commit seppuku. Hidetsugu's entire family, including children, were also executed on Hideyoshi's orders. His death and that of his family contributed to the quick dissolution of Toyotomi authority after Hideyoshi's death three years later.

== Biography ==
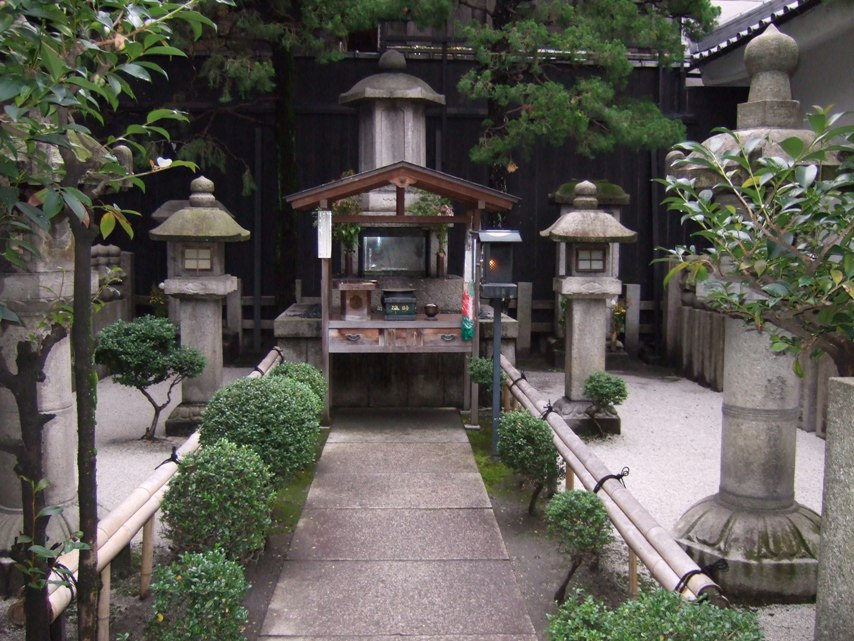
Toyotomi Hidetsugu's grave in the Zuisenji Temple (Kyoto) grounds. In the center is a hollow stone coffin with an inscription carved into it.

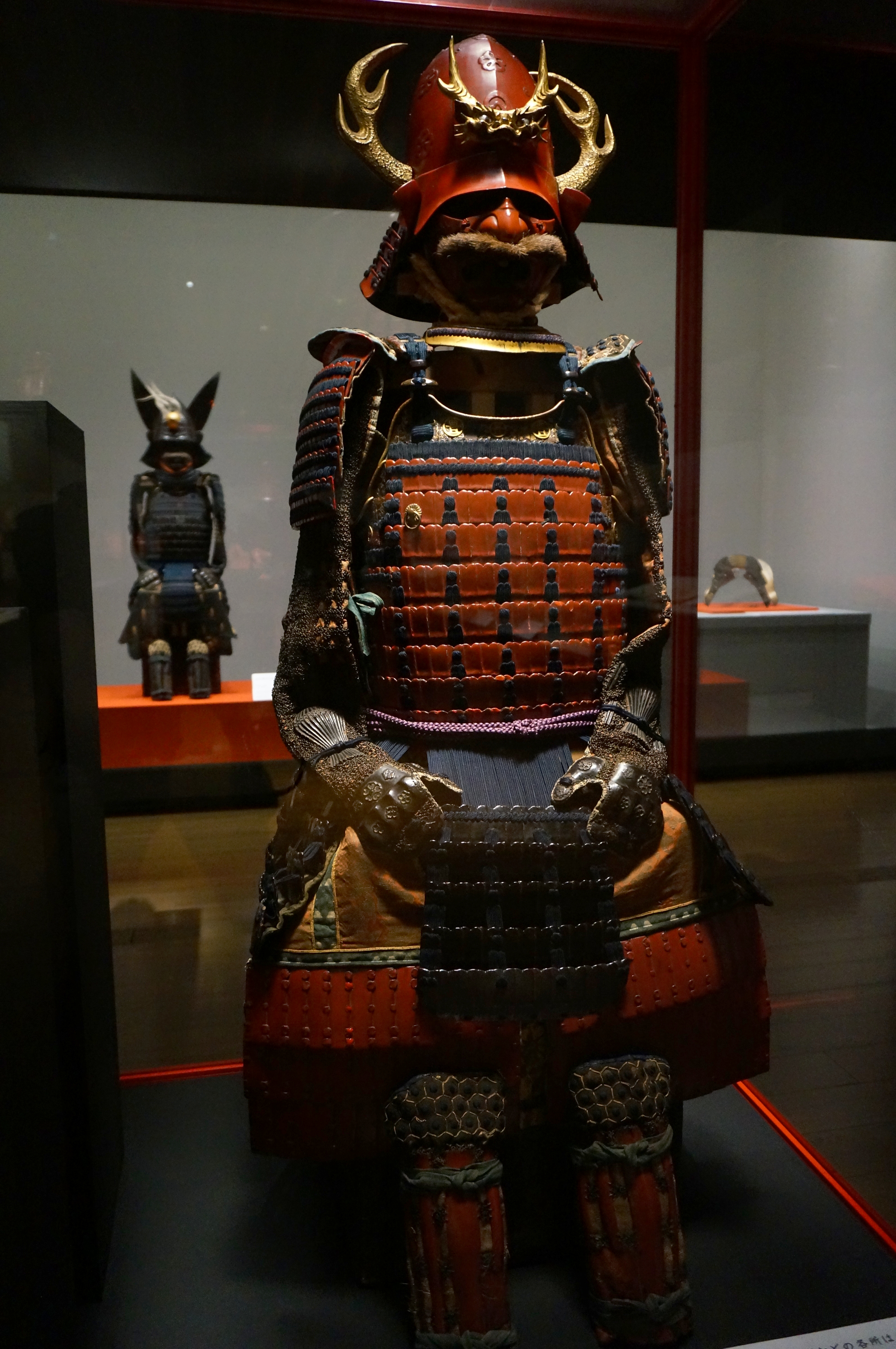
Toyotomi Hidetsugu's gusoku armor, Azuchi–Momoyama period, 16th–17th century, Suntory Museum of Art

Hidetsugu was born to Tomo (Hideyoshi's elder sister) with Miyoshi Kazumichi and later adopted by Miyoshi Yoshifusa, his name was Miyoshi Nobuyoshi. He later renamed himself Hashiba Hidetsugu, in honor of his famous uncle: "Hashiba" was Hideyoshi's family name, and "Hidetsugu" can be translated as "next hide".

After the Incident at Honnō-ji in 1582, Hidetsugu was given a 400,000 koku fiefdom in Ōmi Province because he was one of Hideyoshi's few relatives. In his subsequent career as a general, during the Battle of Shizugatake in 1583, he held Oiwayama-fort (大岩山砦, Oiwayama-toride) with Takayama Ukon and Nakagawa Kiyohide and sustained heavy losses in the Battle of Nagakute in 1584 against Tokugawa Ieyasu.

He proved himself in Hideyoshi's invasion of Shikoku and Siege of Odawara. He also proved to be a competent manager of the castle town of Ōmihachiman.

A practitioner of the shudō tradition, Hidetsugu had a number of wakashū. Among these were Yamamoto Tonoma, Yamada Sanjuro, and his most beloved, Fuwa Bansaku (also Mansaku), who gained lasting renown for his beauty of body and spirit.

In 1590, (Tenshō 18), he was appointed castellan of Kiyosu Castle in Owari Province, where Oda Nobukatsu had once ruled. The following year, Hideyoshi lost his legitimate heir Tsurumatsu (who died before adulthood) and so gave Hidetsugu the position of Imperial Regent. This meant Hidetsugu had to move to Jurakudai in Kyoto, and resulted in a so-called "dual system of government" (二元政治) run by Hideyoshi and Hidetsugu, with the assumption that the latter would succeed the former upon his death. As Hideyoshi was busy handling the invasion of Korea, Hidetsugu acted in his place when handling domestic affairs.

However, in 1593, Hideyoshi's concubine, Yodo-dono, gave birth to a new heir, Hideyori, and the relationship between Hidetsugu and Hideyoshi began to deteriorate. Rumours spread of Hidetsugu committing repeated and unjust murders, earning him the nickname "life-killing kanpaku" (殺生関白, sesshō-kanpaku) – although modern historians doubt that these rumours were accurate.

Finally, in 1595, Hidetsugu was accused of plotting a coup and ordered to commit ritual suicide at Mt. Koya. His three wakashu died with him, committing suicide with Hidetsugu's assistance.

Daimyō associated with him were confined and the Jurakudai was destroyed. Controversially, Hideyoshi ordered the execution of Hidetsugu's entire family, including children, wives and mistresses, at Sanjogawara. The harshness and brutality of executing 39 women and children shocked Japanese society and alienated many daimyō from Toyotomi rule. Combined with the fact that Hidetsugu was the last adult member of the Toyotomi clan besides Hideyoshi himself, the whole incident is often believed to be one of the key causes of the Toyotomi clan's downfall. In a particularly tragic case, Hideyoshi refused to spare the life of Mogami Yoshiaki's 15-year-old daughter, who had only just arrived in Kyoto to become Hidetsugu's concubine and had not yet even met her husband-to-be. Her death caused the powerful Mogami clan to zealously support Tokugawa Ieyasu in the Battle of Sekigahara against Toyotomi loyalist forces, five years later. The bodies were buried along a riverbank but were washed away by a flood; the site of Hidetsugu's grave is Zuisenji Temple (Kyoto).

Only two daughters of Hidetsugu's children were spared: Kikuhime, one month old, who was adopted by her grandfather's nephew, Gotō Noriyoshi and Ryūsei-in who became Sanada Yukimura's concubine.

== Family ==
- Father: Miyoshi Kazumichi (1534–1612)
- Mother: Tomo (1534–1625)
- Siblings:
  - Toyotomi Hidekatsu (1569–1592)
  - Toyotomi Hideyasu (1579–1595)
- Wives, Concubines, and children:
  - Wife: Ikeda Tsuneoki's daughter, called "Waka Mandokoro"
  - Wife: Ichi no Dai (1562–1595), daughter of Imadegawa Harusue
    - Daughter: Ryūsei-in (d.1633), Sanada Yukimura's concubine
  - Concubine: Kogami-dono (d.1595), daughter of Shijo Takamasa
  - Concubine: Ako no Kata (d.1595), daughter of Hibino Kiyozane
    - First son: Toyotomi Senchiyomaru (1590–1595)
  - Concubine: Otatsu no Kata (d.1595), daughter of Yamaguchi Shigekatsu
    - Second son: Toyotomi Hyakumaru (1592–1595)
  - Concubine: Sachiko (d.1595), daughter of Kitano Shobai-in
    - Third son: Toyotomi Jumaru (1593–1595)
  - Concubine: Ocho no Kata (d.1595), daughter of Takenaka Shigesada
    - Fourth son: Toyotomi Tsuchimaru (1595–1595)
  - Concubine: Okame no Mae (d.1595), daughter of Goshoji Zenjo
    - First daughter: Rogetsu-in (1587–1595)
  - Concubine: Kyoku-dono (d.1595), daughter of Itsuki Takashige
    - Third daughter: Kikuhime (1595–1615)
  - Concubine: Komahime [1580-d.1595), daughter of Mogami Yoshiaki
