= Toyotomi Sadako =

Japanese noble woman (1592–1658)

Kita no mandokoro Toyotomi Sadako
- 豊臣 完子
- The emblem (mon) of the Toyotomi clan

Kita no Mandokoro
- In office 1609–1658
- Title: Junior Third Rank (従三位)

Personal life
- Born: 1592
- Died: 1658 (aged 65–66)
- Spouse: Kujo Yukiie (m. 1604; died 1665)
- Children: Nijō Yasumichi; Kujō Michifusa; Matsudono Michimoto (1615-1646); Eigon; Michiko at least two more daughters
- Parent: Toyotomi Hidekatsu; Oeyo

Religious life
- Religion: Buddhism

Military service
- Allegiance: Toyotomi clan Tokugawa clan Kujō family

Toyotomi Sadako (豊臣 完子,1592 – 1658) was a Japanese noble woman from the Sengoku period and Edo period. She was a daughter of Toyotomi Hidekatsu (Toyotomi Hideyoshi's nephew) and Oeyo (Oichi's daughter, Oda Nobunaga's niece). In 1609, she ascended to the status of Kita no Mandokoro. Due to being directly linked to prominent figures of her time, she was inducted into the Junior Third Rank of the Imperial Court (Jusanmi), one of the highest honors that could be conferred by the Emperor of Japan.

== Genealogy ==
Sadako's birth name is not known. She was born of the adopted son of Toyotomi Hideyoshi, Toyotomi Hidekatsu (second son of Hideyoshi's sister, Tomo, with Miyoshi Kazumichi) and Oeyo, daughter of Azai Nagamasa and Oichi. Later, her mother married Tokugawa Hidetada, the second shogun of the Tokugawa shogunate. Sadako was a maternal half-sister of Tokugawa Iemitsu .

Sadako married Kujo Yukiie, a court noble. Her children were Kujo Michifusa, Nijo Yasumichi, Matsudono Michimoto, Eigon, a daughter named Michiko, a second daughter who was wife of Kojun of Hongan-ji Temple and a third daughter.

== Life ==
Toyotomi Sadako's father, Hidekatsu, died of disease in the Bunroku campaign before her birth, and Oeyo gave birth to her in the home of her elder sister, Yodo-dono. Oeyo had her third marriage to Tokugawa Hidetada in 1595, and therefore she was taken in and brought up by her aunt, Yodo-dono. Yodo-dono is said to have brought her up carefully as a biological child, but she was recorded as another child considered Yodo-dono's own (another child considered one's own is generally regarded as an adopted child having only the name of a biological child because they have no right of inheritance), not as an adopted child in the "Keicho nikkenroku," probably due to the matter of inheritance.

Sadako married Kujo Yukiie in June 1604. It is recorded that Sadako's menoto (a woman who provides breast-feeding for a highborn baby) died immediately before the marriage. Yodo-dono organized everything about the marriage, which surprised the people in Kyoto. Also, Yodo-dono built the gorgeous Kujo shintei (Kujo's new residence) under the name of her brother-in-law, Toyotomi Hideyori. It is clarified that there was a movement to have Hideyori appointed to the Sadaijin (Minister of the Left) in the Imperial Court in 1608, four years after the marriage.

On January 31, 1609, Sadako's husband was appointed to the Kanpaku (chief adviser to the Emperor), and she became to a higher political status, Kita no Mandokoro. She was inducted into the Junior Third Rank of the Imperial Court (Jusanmi). Meanwhile, her personal name, 'Sadako,' is thought to have been determined at that time.

After the Toyotomi clan was ruined in 1615 during the Siege of Osaka, Sadako became an adopted daughter of her mother's husband, Tokugawa Hidetada. She also served as a precious mediator for the Tokugawa clan between court nobles and warriors, since Sadako's mother, Oeyo, had married into the Tokugawa family. Toyotomi Sadako died in 1658 at 67 years of age.

There were several children between Sadako and Yukiie, and those children are thought to have been descended from the Toyotomi family. For that reason, Yukiie's family line is thought to be closer to the main branch of the Toyotomi family after the ruin of the Toyotomi clan. Those children married into the Asano clan, and therefore the Asano family was also descended from the Toyotomi family. Meanwhile, for the reasons stated above, Emperor Showa is descended from her.

== Family ==
- Father: Toyotomi Hidekatsu
- Mother: Oeyo
- First adopted parents: Toyotomi Hideyoshi and Yodo-dono
- Second adopted father: Tokugawa Hidetada
- Husband: Kujō Yukiie
- Children:
  - Nijō Yasumichi
  - Kujō Michifusa
  - Matsudono Michimoto (1615-1646)
  - Michiko married Sennyo
  - daughter (1613-1632) married Ryōnyo
  - daughter (1625-1664)
  - son (1622-1664)

== Bibliography ==
- ネケト. 九条家（摂家） (in Japanese). Archived from the original on 2007-09-27.
