= Tomo (Toyotomi) =

Japanese samurai class woman

Nisshu-ni
- 日秀尼
- The emblem (mon) of the Toyotomi clan

Personal life
- Born: 1534
- Died: 1625 (aged 90–91)
- Children: Toyotomi Hidetsugu; Toyotomi Hidekatsu; Toyotomi Hideyasu
- Parent: Ōmandokoro

Religious life
- Religion: Buddhism

Military service
- Allegiance: Toyotomi clan Tokugawa clan

Toyotomi Tomo or Nisshu-ni (日秀尼, 1534 - 30 May 1625) was a Japanese noble woman member from the aristocrat samurai family, Toyotomi clan, from the Sengoku period to the early Edo period. She was the sister of Toyotomi Hideyoshi the second "Great Unifier" of Japan. She was the daughter of Ōmandokoro, the matriarch of Toyotomi clan, and mother of Toyotomi Hidekatsu, Toyotomi Hidetsugu and Toyotomi Hideyasu. Tomo was the founder of Zensho-ji Temple. She was one of the last survivors of the Toyotomi clan; the clan was exterminated after the Siege of Osaka.

== Life ==
Her personal name was Tomo or Tomoko, but she was commonly known as Munakumoni or Nisshu-ni. Her pseudonym was Zuiryu-in. Tomo married Miwa Yasuke, a farmer who called himself a relative of the Miwa Family in Yamato Province and renamed himself Miwa Yoshifusa later. During the marriage, Tomo gave birth to Hidetsugu (1568), Hidekatsu (1569) and Hideyasu (1579).

In 1591, Hidetsugu and Hidekatsu became adopted sons of Hideyoshi and also became kanpaku (advisor to the emperor) but the relationship between Hidetsugu and Hideyoshi began to deteriorate after his son Toyotomi Hideyori was born, and he was ordered to commit seppuku while his wife and all other women of his household with him were executed beside Sanjo-gawa River. The harshness and brutality of executing 39 women and children shocked Japanese society and alienated many daimyō from Toyotomi rule. Combined with the fact that Hidetsugu was the last adult member of the Toyotomi clan besides Hideyoshi himself, the whole incident is often seen to be one of the key causes of the Toyotomis' downfall.

Following this incident, Tomo became a Buddhist nun, took the name Nisshu-ni and established a Buddhist hall on the site of the present Zensho-ji Temple. Zuiryu-ji Temple was dedicated by Nisshu to pray for her own soul following her death. This temple began with a thatched hut that was built in 1597 in Kameyama, Saga to pray for the soul of Hidetsugu

Her husband Yoshifusa died of illness around 1600. Nisshu had Ondahime, her great-granddaughter and the fifth daughter of Sanada Yukimura, take refuge at her residence at the time of the downfall of the Toyotomi family resulting from the Siege of Osaka in 1615. Later, Ondahime married Iwaki Nobutaka, the younger brother of Satake Yoshinobu.

Tomo survived the entire period of the fighting states, seeing the rise and fall of the Toyotomi family, the clan that unified Japan before the formation of the Tokugawa Shogunate. She was the only survivor of the main lineage of Toyotomi's matriarch, Omandokoro, dying on April 20, 1625. She was 92 years old.

== Family ==
- Father: Chikuami
- Mother: Ōmandokoro (1513–1592)
- Siblings:
  - Toyotomi Hideyoshi (1537-1598)
  - Toyotomi Hidenaga (1540-1591)
  - Asahi no kata (1543-1590), married Tokugawa Ieyasu
- Husband:
  - Miyoshi Yoshifusa
- Children:
  - Toyotomi Hidekatsu
  - Toyotomi Hidetsugu
  - Toyotomi Hideyasu

== Bibliography ==
- Yosuke Watanabe National Diet Library Digital Collection "Toyota Ko and his Family" Japan Academic Promotion Association, 1919 .
