= Kujō Kaneharu =

Kujō Kaneharu (九条 兼晴; 1641 – 1677), son of Takatsukasa Norihira and adopted son of regent Michifusa, was a kugyō or Japanese court noble of the Edo period (1603–1868). Unlike other members of the family, he did not hold regent positions kampaku and sesshō. He married a daughter of Kujō Michifusa.

== Family ==
- Father: Takatsukasa Norihira
- Mother: Reizei Tamemitsu’s daughter
- Foster Father: Kujō Michifusa
- Wife: Kujō Tokihime, daughter of the regent Kujō Michifusa
- Concubine: unknown
- Children:
  - Kujō Sukezane by Tokihime
  - Nijō Tsunahira by Concubine
  - Jūnyo (1673-1739)
