= Asahi no kata =

Japanese noble (1543–1590)

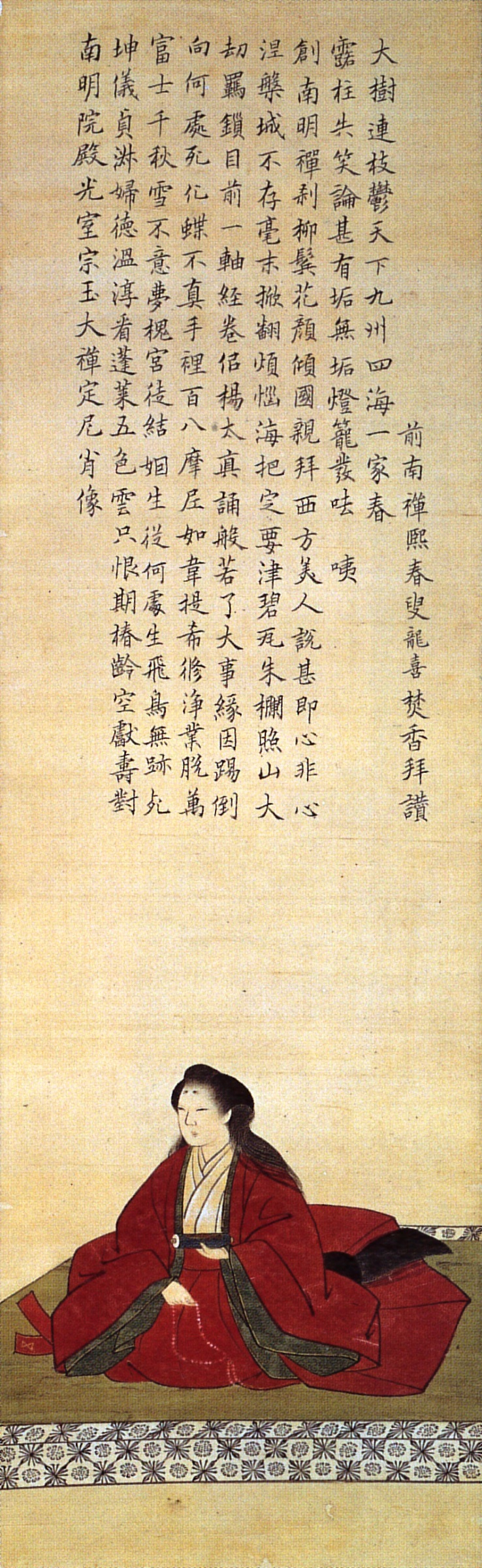
Portrait of Asahi-hime, younger sister of Toyotomi Hideyoshi

Asahi no kata (朝日の方, 1543 – February 18, 1590) was a Japanese aristocrat of the Sengoku period. She was a half-sister of Toyotomi Hideyoshi and wife of Tokugawa Ieyasu, two of the three "Great Unifiers" of Japan. Apart from "Asahi no kata", she is also known as Suruga Gozen (駿河御前) and Asahi-hime (朝日姫), though none of these are personal names, which roughly translate to "the person of Asahi", "the Lady Suruga", or "Princess Asahi", respectively.

== Life ==
In 1543, Asahihime was born as the daughter of Ōmandokoro and Chikuami, a farmer in Owari Province. Along with the rise of Hideyoshi under Oda Nobunaga, her husband was elevated to the status of a bushi and adopted the name of Saji Hyūga-no-kami.

Asahi no kata was first married to Saji Hyūga no kami, but when her brother Toyotomi Hideyoshi wished to make peace with Tokugawa Ieyasu after the Battle of Komaki and Nagakute, Hideyoshi expressed interest in marrying her to Ieyasu. In 1586, the retainers of Oda Nobukatsu were dispatched as messengers to Yoshida in Mikawa and, via Sakai Tadatsugu, proposed a marriage to appease Tokugawa Ieyasu. Ieyasu accepted the proposal and sent Sakakibara Yasumasa as his representative to Kyōto to exchange betrothal gifts.

As a result, Saji Hyūga committed suicide, in order to not pose an obstacle to such a powerful political marriage, and the two were married soon afterwards.

Asahihime departed from Ōsaka Castle and went to Hideyoshi's formal residence in Kyōto known as jurakutei. In the fifth month, a wedding procession departed from the capital with over 150 participants including Asano Nagamasa and others famous warlords. During the procession, retainers of Nobukatsu including Oda Nagamasu also joined. Days later, the procession reached Nishino in Mikawa, and, in May 14, arrived in Hamamatsu whereupon she was married into the Tokugawa family as the formal (second) wife of Ieyasu. At this time, Ieyasu was forty-five years old and Asahihime was forty-four. Thereafter, Asahihime kept a residence in Fuchū in Suruga so she was referred to as Suruga Gozen.

Even after completion of the wedding ceremony, Ieyasu did not go to Kyōto so, on the premise that Ōmandokoro would visit Suruga Gozen in Okazaki, she further became a hostage, whereupon Ieyasu went to Kyōto and entered into a peace arrangement with Hideyoshi.

In 1588, Suruga Gozen visited Kyōto to visit her ill mother, but, before long, she began to recover, so, on September, she returned to Suruga. It is not certain when she went to Kyōto again, but while residing in Hideyoshi's residence, she fell ill in the first month of 1590, and died on January at the age of forty-seven.

Around this time, Ieyasu was preparing for an expedition known as the Conquest of Odawara, and, while concealing his mourning, interred her at the Tōfuku Temple in Kyōto. Suffering from ill health in her later years, Suruga Gozen became a follower of the Rinzai sect of Buddhism, and her posthumous name is Nanmei-in.

A memorial tower was built at the Tōfuku Temple so that Ieyasu could pay tribute to her after her death. This is the family temple for the Tokugawa shōgun family where her portrait is kept. Ieyasu also had built a grave at the Zuiryū Temple on Mount Taiun in Sunpu. Hideyoshi visited this site to pay his respects while en route on the Conquest of Odawara. A memorial tower was constructed for memorial services and he donated lands to the temple.

Tokugawa and his new wife visited her mother when she fell ill in 1589; the mother of Asahi no kata and Hideyoshi died the following year, as did Asahi no kata herself.

== Family ==
- Father: Chikuami
- Mother: Ōmandokoro (1513–1592)
- Siblings:
  - Toyotomi Hideyoshi (1537–1598)
  - Toyotomi Hidenaga (1540–1591)
  - Tomo (1534–1625), married Soeda Jinbae
- Husbands:
  - Soeda Yoshinari (m. ??–1586)
  - Tokugawa Ieyasu (m. 1586–1590)
