= Kujō Michifusa =

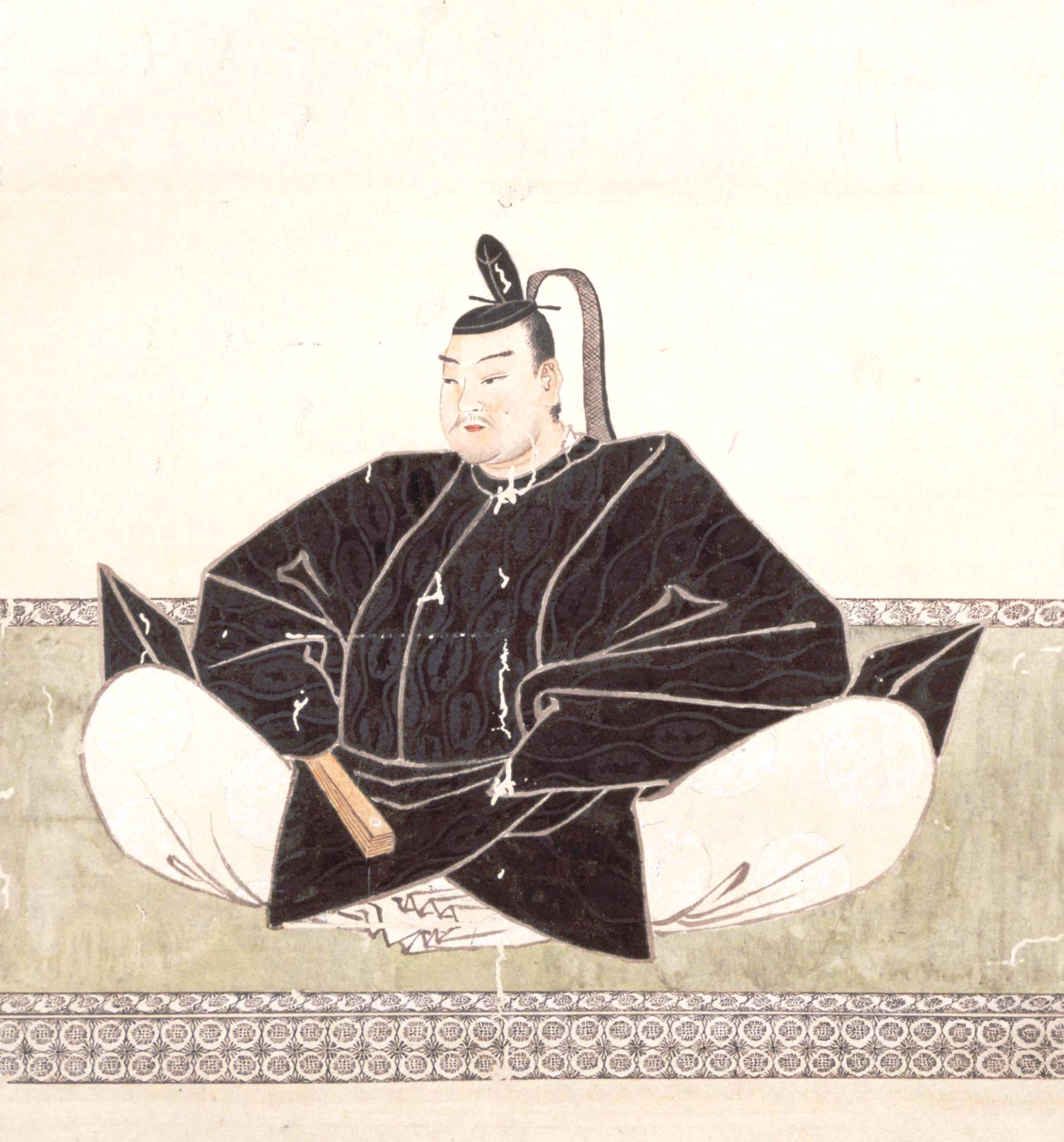
Kujō Michifusa

Kujō Michifusa (九条 道房; 1609 – 1647), son of regent Yukiie, was a kugyō or Japanese court noble of the Edo period (1603–1868). He held a regent position sesshō in 1647. He married a daughter of second head of Echizen Domain Matsudaira Tadanao. One of the couple's daughters married regent Kujō Kaneharu who they adopted as son, and their second and fifth daughters are consorts of third head of Hiroshima Domain Asano Tsunaakira.

== Family ==
- Father: Kujō Yukiie
- Mother: Toyotomi Sadako (1592–1658), daughter of Toyotomi Hidekatsu and Asai Oeyo
- Wife: Matsudaira Tsuruhime (1618–1671), daughter of Matsudaira Tadanao of Fukui Domain and Tokugawa Katsuhime (daughter of Tokugawa Hidetada)
- Children (all by Tsuruhime):
  - Tokihime married Kujō Kaneharu
  - Aihime (d. 1659) married Asano Tsunaakira
  - Yasuhime (d. 1679) married Asano Tsunaakira
  - Yoshihime married Jonnyo
  - Umehime married Matsudaira Tsunakata
