= Toyotomi Hidenaga =

Japanese warlord (1540–1591), half-brother of Toyotomi Hideyoshi

- 豊臣 秀長

Governor of Izumi, Kii and Yamato Province
- In office 1585–1591

Personal details
- Born: Koichirō (小一郎); April 8, 1540
- Died: February 15, 1591 (aged 50) Kōriyama, Yamato, Japan
- Spouse: Chiun'in
- Relatives: Chikuami (father); Ōmandokoro (mother); Toyotomi Hideyoshi (half-brother); Asahi no kata (sister); Toyotomi Hidetsugu (nephew); Toyotomi Hideyori (nephew)
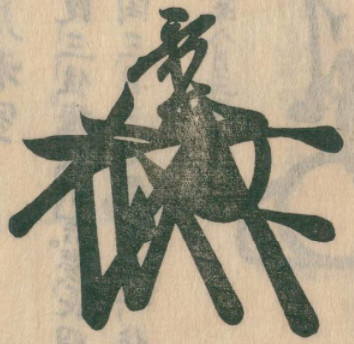
- Signature

Military service
- Allegiance: Toyotomi clan
- Rank: Dainagon
- Unit: Toyotomi clan
- Battles/wars: Chugoku campaign (1577-1582); Battle of Yamazaki (1582); Battle of Shizugatake (1583); Battle of Komaki and Nagakute (1584); Invasion of Shikoku (1585); Kyūshū Campaign (1587)

Toyotomi Hidenaga (豊臣 秀長; April 8, 1540 – February 15, 1591), formerly known as Hashiba Koichirō (羽柴 小一郎) and Hashiba Hidenaga (羽柴 秀長), was a Japanese daimyō of the Sengoku period and a half-brother of Toyotomi Hideyoshi. As one of the most powerful and significant warlords of Japan, he was regarded as "Hideyoshi's brain and right-arm".

== Life ==
Hidenaga was also known by his court title, Dainagon (大納言). He promoted Tōdō Takatora to chief engineer. He led Hideyoshi's vanguard force a few years later into Satsuma Province, contributing heavily to his half-brother's victories in gaining control of Kyūshū. Hidenaga was awarded the provinces of Kii, Izumi and Yamato, reaching a governance of one million koku.

He took part in the 1582 Battle of Yamazaki, the 1583 Battle of Shizugatake, also lead Toyotomi's troops at the Invasion of Shikoku (1585), and the 1587 Battle of Takajo, Battle of Sendaigawa and Siege of Kagoshima.

He died 15 February 1591, (Note: 22nd day, 1st month, Tenshō 19.) at Kōriyama, Yamato Province (now Nara Prefecture), and his tomb is called Dainagon-zuka (大納言塚).

During the Warring States period, it was not uncommon for even parents and siblings to engage in lethal conflicts, yet he unwaveringly supported his brother. Many historians believe that "Had Hidenaga lived longer, the Toyotomi regime would have been secure". Indeed, Hideyoshi's Korean campaign and the purge of Hidetsugu occurred after the deaths of Hidenaga and Sen no Rikyū.

== Family ==
- Father: Chikuami
- Mother: Ōmandokoro (1516-1592)
- Siblings:
  - Toyotomi Hideyoshi
  - Asahi no kata
  - Tomo, married Soeda Jinbae
- Wife: Chiun'in
- Children:
  - Koichiro later Yosuke
  - Kikuhime, married Toyotomi Hideyasu
  - Daizen-in, married Mori Hidemoto

== Honours ==
- Junior Second Rank (August 8, 1587)

== See also ==
- Hōkoku Shrine (Osaka)
- Brothers in Arms, a television series about the life of Hidenaga.
