= Toyotomi Hidekatsu =

Japanese samurai (1569–1592)

- 豊臣 秀勝
- Born: 1569
- Died: October 14, 1592 (aged 22–23)
- Relatives: Oeyo (wife); Toyotomi Sadako (daughter); Tomo (mother)
- Military career
- Nickname: Kokichi
- Conflicts: Korean campaign

Toyotomi Hidekatsu (豊臣 秀勝, 1569 – October 14, 1592) was Toyotomi Hideyoshi's nephew (later adopted) and a Japanese samurai of the Sengoku period. He was the lord of Gifu Castle between 1591-1592.

He was the second son of Hideyoshi's sister, Tomo, with Miyoshi Kazumichi. His childhood name was Kokichi and given that he is often confused with Hashiba Hidekatsu (fourth son of the Oda Nobunaga and also adopted son of Toyotomi Hideyoshi), historians refer to him as Kokichi Hidekatsu for convenience. He married Oeyo, daughter of Oichi and Azai Nagamasa and the sister of Yodo-dono.

In 1592, he participated in the Japanese invasions of Korea launched by Toyotomi Hideyoshi, where he died of illness at Karashima (Kyosaito) [called Geoje Island, Korea].

His daughter Toyotomi Sadako married the regent Kujō Yukiie and become Kita no mandokoro.

== See also ==
- Gō, the Japanese Taiga drama that aired in 2011
