= Kujō Yukiie =

Kujō Yukiie (九条 幸家; April 7, 1586 – September 29, 1665), son of regent Kanetaka, was a kugyō or Japanese court noble of the Edo period (1603–1868). His given name was initially忠栄 (Tadahide). He held a regent position kampaku from 1608 to 1612 and from 1619 to 1623. He married Toyotomi Sadako (1592–1658), a daughter of Toyotomi Hidekatsu and Oeyo and adopted daughter of shōgun Tokugawa Hidetada. The couple had, among other children, sons Nijō Yasumichi, Kujō Michifusa, Matsudono Michimoto (1615-1646).

== Family ==
- Father: Kujō Kanetaka
- Mother: Takakura Hiroko
- Wife: Toyotomi Sadako (1592–1658), daughter of Toyotomi Hidekatsu and Oeyo
- Children (all by Toyotomi Sadako):
  - Nijō Yasumichi
  - Kujō Michifusa
  - Matsudono Michimoto (1615-1646)
  - daughter married Sennyo
  - daughter (1613-1632) married Ryōnyo
  - daughter (1625-1664)
  - son (1622-1664)
