= Ono Otsū =

Japanese calligrapher

- 小野お通
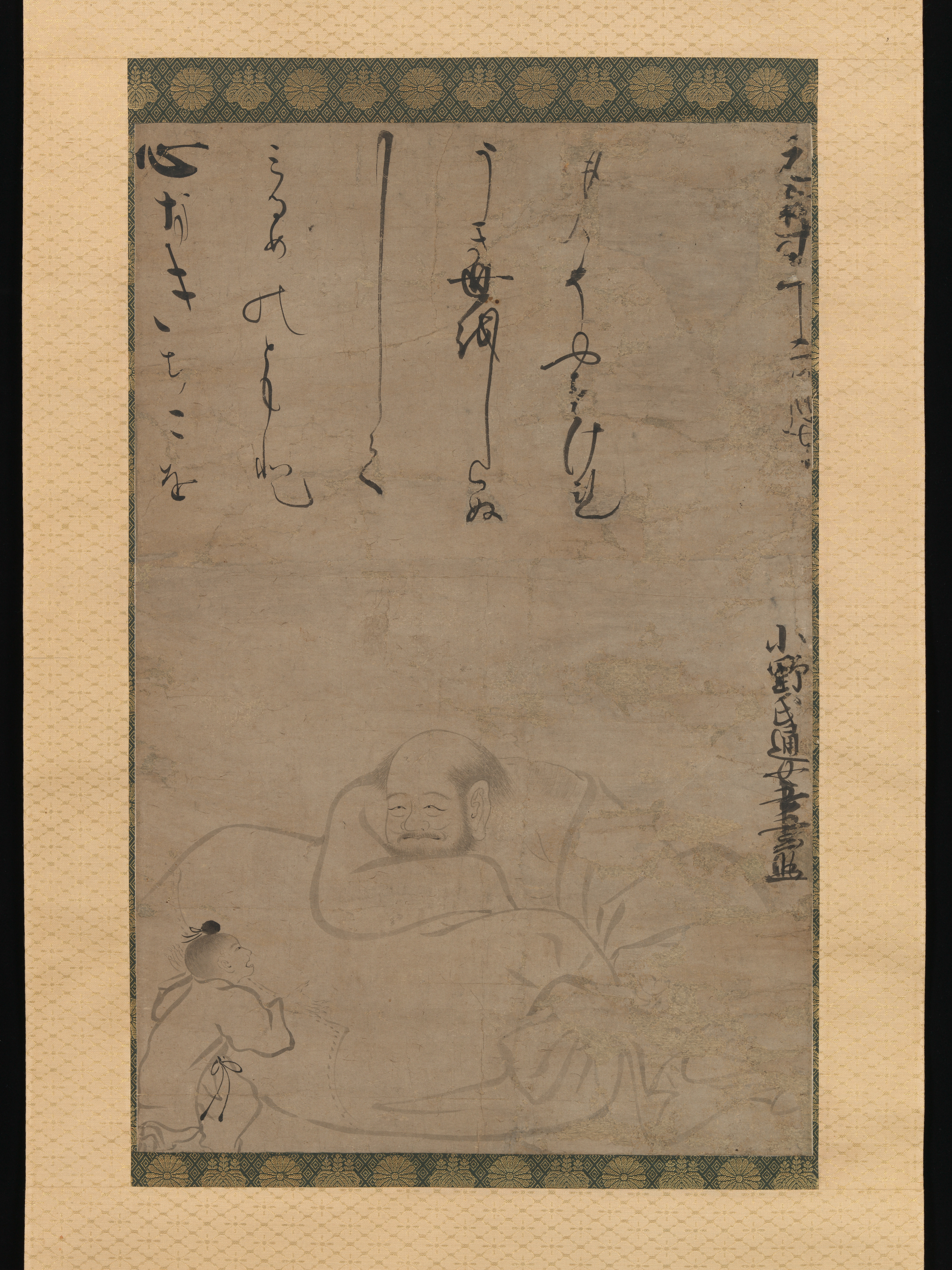
- Hotei with a Child - Ono Otsu (1624)
- Born: 1559-1568
- Died: 1631
- Other name: Ono Ozu
- Occupations: Painter, calligrapher, Musician and poet

Ono Otsū (小野お通, 1559 or 1568–1631), also known as Ono no Ozū, was a Japanese noblewoman, calligrapher, poet, painter and musician. She was a student of the arts in Kyoto, studying painting, calligraphy, music, chanting, and waka poetry. Her work was noticed by members of the Tokugawa shogunate, including Tokugawa Ieyasu and Tokugawa Hidetada, and she was often hired by them to teach members of their court. Because she was the author of works that impacted Japanese art during the Azuchi-Momoyama and Edo period, and served several prominent figures, Otsū was proclaimed one of the leading female calligraphers of premodern Japan.

== Biography ==
Ono Otsū was born in 1559 into a noble samurai family, but there is not much information about her early life. According to some sources, Ono Masahide, an ally of Oda Nobunaga and owner of a fiefdom in Mino province, would take care of Ono Otsū after her father's death. She may have married a daimyo of Noto province and then relocated to Kyoto following the death of her husband in battle. In the capital, she studied arts, including waka composition with the nobleman Kujō Tanemichi (1507–1594) and was subsequently welcomed into aristocratic and high-ranking military circles. Learned writing from Kanoe Nobutada, a member of the Emperor's court in Kyoto, one of the Three Calligraphers of Konoe.

She worked throughout her life as a lady-in-waiting in the courts of families of important leaders such as Toyotomi Hideyoshi, Tokugawa Ieyasu and Tokugawa Hidetada. Skilled in poetry, she also tried her hand at calligraphy, painting, music, and cha no yu (tea ceremony). She became famous for her artistic talent and taught both poetry and calligraphy at the various courts. During her life, she was said to have served Fujiwara no Haruko (Emperor Go-Yōzei's mother), Oda Nobunaga, Toyotomi Hideyoshi, Kodai-in (Nene), Yodo-dono. Some accounts declare that she served in the retinue of Tokugawa Masako, the chief consort of Emperor Go-Mizunoo and mother of Empress Meishō. She was also said to be close to the daimyo of Ueda Domain and Matsushiro domain, Sanada Nobuyuki.

Otsū apparently married a member of the Toyotomi clan, but they divorced due to her husband's alcoholism. After this, she became a tutor for a noblewoman.

== Known works ==
Celebrated above all as a calligrapher, Ono Otsū was also important for her paintings in which she placed a calligraphic inscription on the image. Her style of calligraphy marked by ornamental decorations became a great inspiration for women of the highest castes of the Edo period. She was thought to be the author of the Joruri Monogatari, the precursor to Joruri. She created distinctive style calligraphy, decorated sheets of decorated paper in a pair of albums with scenes from The Tale of Genji painted by an anonymous artist from the Tosa school. Otsū wrote mainly in kana, interspersed with extravagant kanji for poetically evocative words. The variations, sometimes subtle, sometimes dramatic, in the weight of the brushstrokes and the radical spacing between the characters and groups of characters are hallmarks of her style.

Otsū also demonstrated her mastery of the “scattered writing” technique, by which she skillfully placed the poem's records on the page and sometimes positioned the lines of the poem out of sequence. She was also known for her paintings of Zen Buddhism subjects in monochrome ink in the traditional style. Selections of her calligraphy are in the collections of the Metropolitan Museum of Art, including a 1624 piece known as Hotei with a child.

== See also ==
- Rikei
