= Prince Hachijō Toshihito =

Japanese noble (1579–1629)

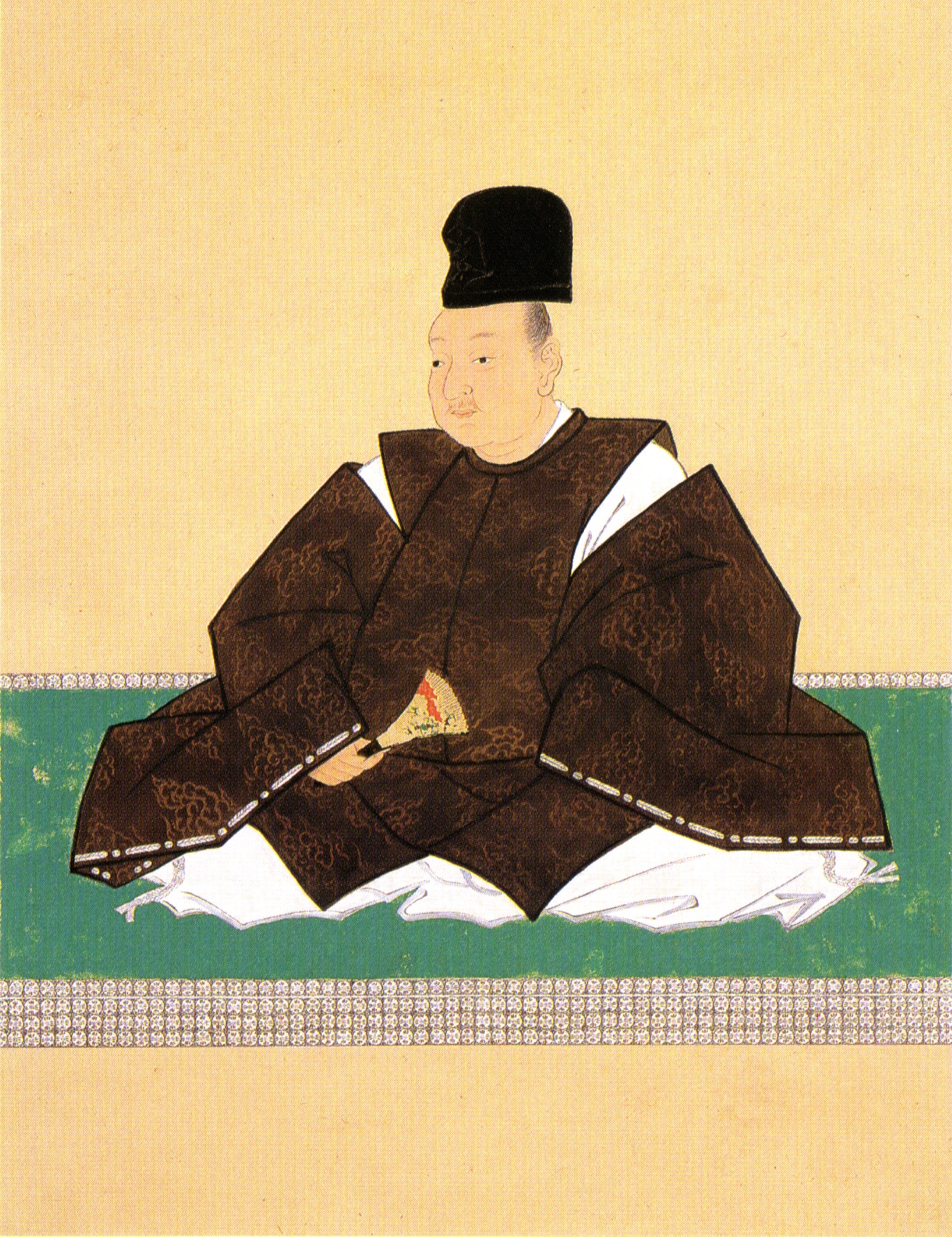

Prince Hachijō
- Reign: 1589–1629
- Successor: Prince Hachijō Toshitada
- Born: February 3, 1579; Kyoto Prefecture, Japan
- Died: May 29, 1629 (aged 50)
- Father: Prince Masahito
- Mother: Fujiwara Haruko

Prince Hachijō Toshihito (八条宮 智仁親王, Hachijō-no-miya Toshihito; 3 February 1579 – 29 May 1629) was a court noble of Japan during the Sengoku period. Toshihito was the younger brother of Emperor Go-Yōzei. After 1588, Toyotomi Hideyoshi adopted Toshihito in an effort to greatly strengthen the Toyotomi and the Imperial ties. In 1590, Hideyoshi gave Toshihito 3,000 koku worth of land and was slated to act as Hideyoshi's governor of Japan during China's anticipated cession of influence in Korea during the invasions of 1592–1593.

== Katsura Imperial Villa ==
Prince Hachijō Toshihito built the Katsura Imperial Villa, or Katsura Detached Palace, in Kyoto. It was built to be a place to view the moon.

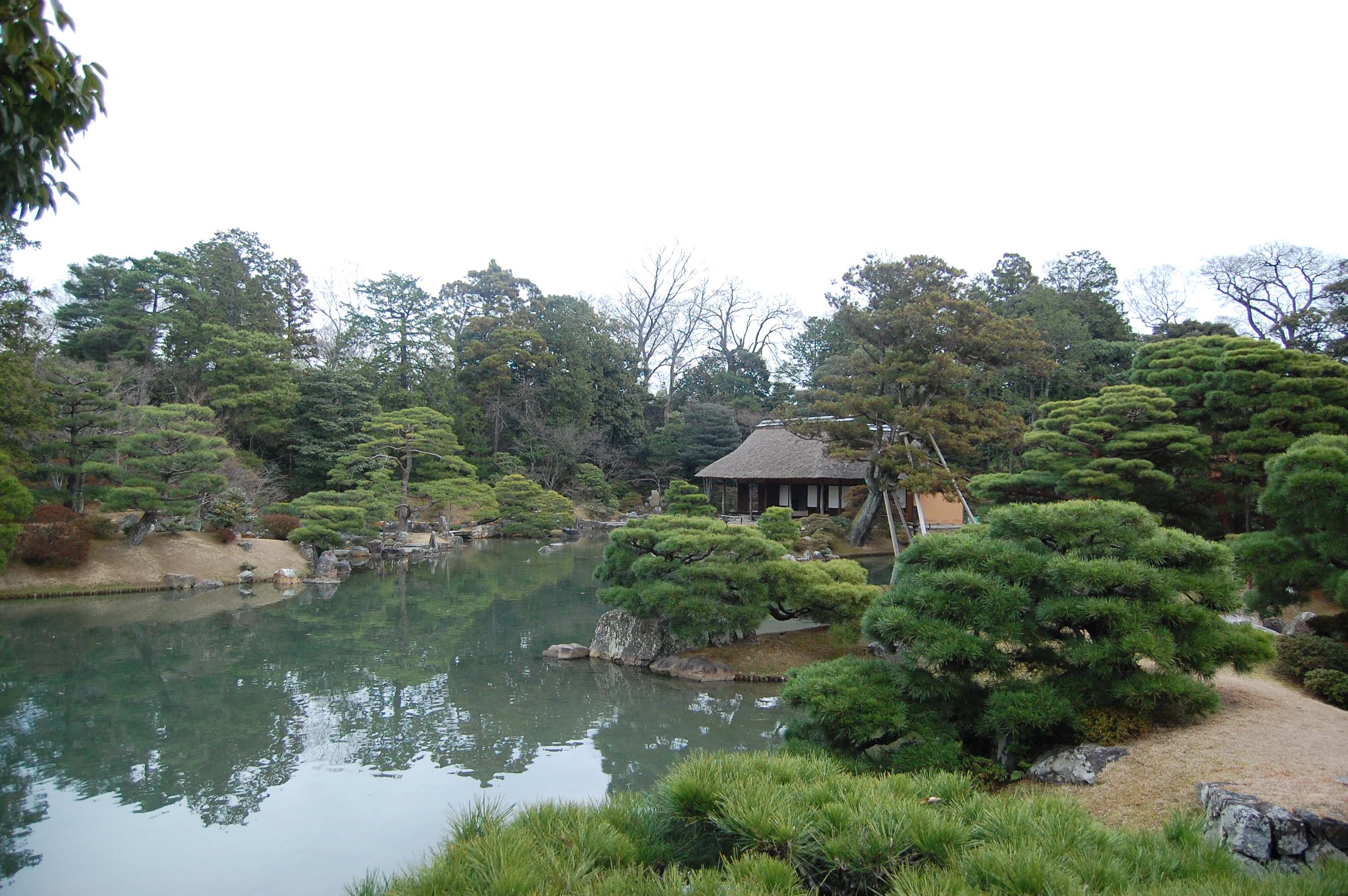
One of the gardens of the Katsura Imperial Villa.

== Family ==
Parents

- Father: Prince Masahito (誠仁親王, 16 May 1552 – 7 September 1586)
- Mother: Fujiwara no (Kajūji) Haruko (藤原勧修寺 晴子, 1553 – 21 March 1660)

Consort and issue(s):

- Legal Wife: Kyōgoku Tsuneko (京極常子), daughter of Kyōgoku Takatomo (京極 高知)
  - First Son: Prince Hachijō Toshitada (八条宮智忠親王, 6 December 1619 – 20 August 1662)
  - First Daughter: Princess Umemiya (梅宮), later Jukō-in (珠光院)
  - Second Son: Imperial Prince Ryōshō (良尚入道親王, 16 December 1623 – 6 August 1693)
  - Third Son: Hirotada Tadayuki (広幡忠幸, 1624 – 9 December 1669)
- Concubine: Daughter of Kujō Kanetaka (九条兼孝)
