= Katsura-no-miya =

Extinct (1881) branch Japanese royalty

Katsura-no-miya 桂宮: Hachijō-no-miya 八条宮 (1589–1689); Tokiwai-no-miya 常磐井宮 (1689–1692); Kyōgoku-no-miya 京極宮 (1697–1770)
- Branch of the Imperial Family of Japan (shinnōke)
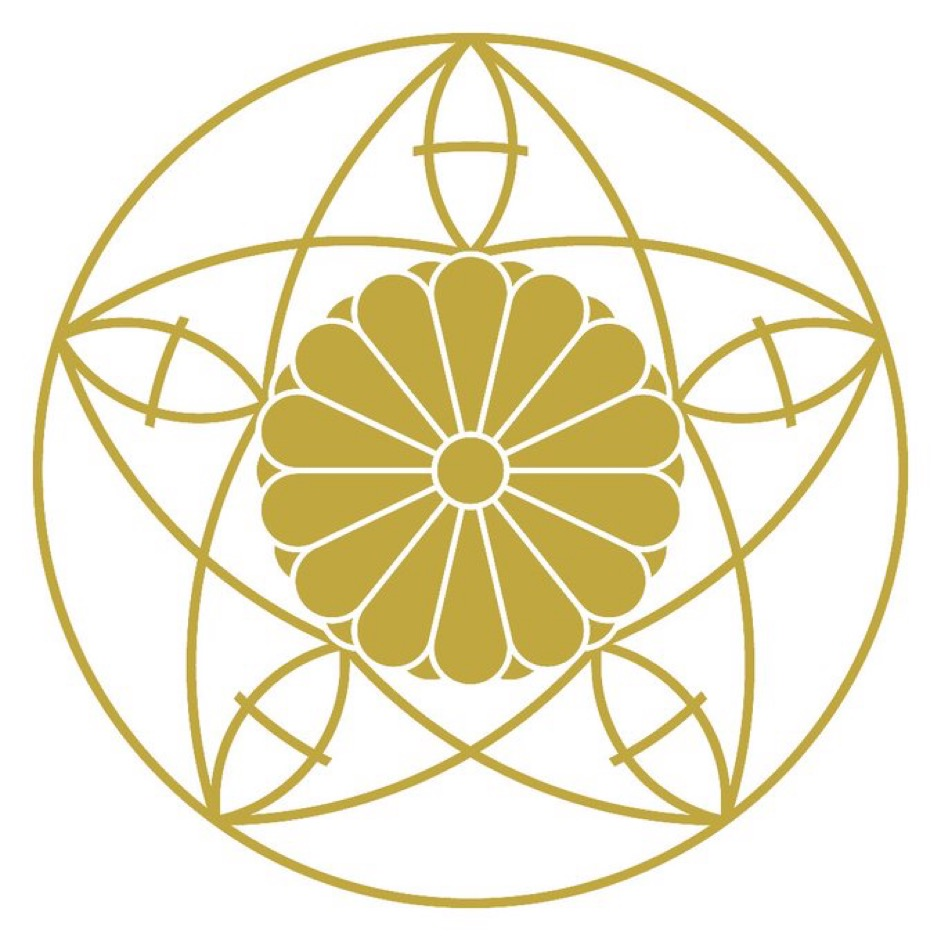
- Mon of Katsura-no-miya
- Parent family: Imperial Family of Japan
- Origin: Kyoto
- Founded: 1589
- Founder: Imperial Prince Hachijō Toshihito (Crown Prince Masahito's sixth son)
- Final head: Imperial Princess Katsura Sumiko (Emperor Ninkō's third daughter)
- Connected families: Arisugawa-no-miya; Kan'in-no-miya
- Estate: Katsura Imperial Villa
- Dissolution: 1881
- Cadet branches: Hirotada noble family (non-imperial branch)

The Katsura-no-miya (桂宮家) was one of the four shinnōke, branches of the Imperial Family of Japan which were eligible to succeed to the Chrysanthemum Throne in the event that the main line should die out. It was founded by Prince Toshihito, a grandson of Emperor Ōgimachi and brother of Emperor Go-Yōzei. It is the second oldest of the shinnōke, after the Fushimi-no-miya.

The Katsura-no-miya house has died out several times, and has undergone a number of changes in name. It was originally titled Hachijō-no-miya. Prince Hachijō-no-miya Toshihito lived at the Katsura Imperial Villa in Kyoto, hence he and all of his lineage are referred to as Katsura-no-miya.

Prince Yoshihito of Mikasa, the second son of Prince Mikasa received the title Katsura-no-miya in 1988. However, this title is connected to his badge (お印, o-shirushi), Katsura (Cercidiphyllum) and thus is not related to the shinnōke title.

Unless otherwise stated, all Princes listed here are the sons of their predecessors.

	Name	Born	Succeeded	Died	notes
1	Hachijō-no-miya Toshihito shinnō (八条宮 智仁親王)	1579	1589	1629	grandson of Emperor Ōgimachi, brother of Emperor Go-Yōzei
2	Hachijō-no-miya Toshitada shinnō (八条宮 智忠親王)	1620	1629	1662	married granddaughter of Maeda Toshiie
3	Hachijō-no-miya Yasuhito shinnō (八条宮 穏仁親王)	1643	1662	1665	son of Emperor Go-Mizunoo, first cousin once removed from Toshitada
4	Hachijō-no-miya Osahito shinnō (八条宮 長仁親王)	1655	1665	1675	son of Emperor Go-Sai, brother of above
5	Hachijō-no-miya Naohito shinnō (八条宮 尚仁親王)	1671	1675	1689	brother of Osahito
6	Tokiwai-no-miya Saku-no-miya (常磐井宮 作宮)	1689	1689	1692	son of Emperor Reigen, cousin of Naohito
7	Kyōgoku-no-miya Ayahito shinnō (京極宮 文仁親王)	1680	1697	1711	brother of Saku-no-miya, adopted son of Arisugawa-no-miya Yukihito
8	Kyōgoku-no-miya Yakahito shinnō (京極宮 家仁親王)	1704	1709	1768	
9	Kyōgoku-no-miya Kinhito shinnō (京極宮 公仁親王)	1733	1768	1770	
10	Katsura-no-miya Takehito shinnō (桂宮 盛仁親王)	1810	1810	1811	son of Emperor Kōkaku, second cousin twice removed from Kinhito
11	Katsura-no-miya Misahito shinnō (桂宮 節仁親王)	1833	1836	1836	son of Emperor Ninkō, nephew of Takehito
12	Katsura-no-miya Sumiko naishinnō (桂宮 淑子内親王)	1829	1863	1881	daughter of Emperor Ninkō, half sister to Kazu-no-miya

== See also ==
- Katsura Imperial Villa
