= Konoe Sakiko =

Member of the Japanese imperial court

Konoe Sakiko (近衛 前子; 1575 – August 11, 1630) was a member of the Japanese imperial court from the Azuchi-Momoyama period to the Edo period. She was a consort to Emperor Go-Yozei, and the mother of Emperor Go-Mizunoo. Her birth father was Konoe Sakihisa, and her adopted father was Toyotomi Hideyoshi. Her posthumous Buddhist name was Chukamonin (中和門院).

== Life ==
Konoe was born in 1575 to Konoe Sakihisa. In 1586, she was adopted by Toyotomi Hideyoshi so that he could bring a daughter to the court and introduce her as the Emperor's new consort, something that chancellors in his position traditionally do. Konoe was officially presented at court on December 16, 1586. She had the title nyōgo, which put her one step below the empress. She was the first person to hold that title in more than 200 years. She had 12 children with Emperor Go-Yozei, most notably Emperor Go-Mizunoo, Konoe Nobuhiro, and Ichijo Akiyoshi. Her title changed to "Empress Mother" after giving birth to Go-Mizunoo.

Konoe died on August 11, 1630. Her remains are interred at the Sennyu-ji.
