= Konoe Nobuhiro =

Konoe Nobuhiro (近衛 信尋; 24 June 1599–15 November 1649), Ōzan (応山) as a monk, was a kugyō or Japanese court noble of the Edo period (1603–1868). He was born the fourth son of Emperor Go-Yōzei. His mother was Empress Dowager Chūka, or Konoe Sakiko by birth. Nobuhiro was adopted by Konoe Nobutada, his maternal uncle, as Nobutada had no legitimate heir.

He had his genpuku ceremony in 1606 and was promoted to higher positions successively afterward. He was Udaijin in 1620; and he held the regent position of kampaku from 1623 to 1629. In 1645 he became a monk. After his death, he was buried in his family's tomb at Daitoku-ji.

It is obscure who was his wife; but there are accounts that he had three children. Hisatsugu was his son and heir. Another son became a priest at Kajū-ji (勧修寺) and was titled Kanshun (寛俊). A daughter of his was a consort of Tokugawa Mitsukuni, second head of the Mito Domain.

== Family ==
Parents

- Father: Emperor Go-Yōzei (後陽成天皇, 31 December 1571 –25 September 1617)
- Mother: Konoe Sakiko (近衛 前子)(1575 – August 11, 1630), Empress Dowager Chūka

Consorts and issues:

- Wife: Daughter of Konoe Nobutada (近衞信尹)
- Concubine: Court lady (家女房)
  - Konoe Hisatsugu (近衛 尚嗣, 1622 – 1653), first son
  - Hirotoshi (寛俊), Priest at Kajuji (Kanshuji) Temple, second son
  - Lady Chōkun (長君), first daughter
  - Konoe Hiroko (近衞尋子), Wife of Tokugawa Mitsukuni, second daughter
  - Third daughter, Nun at Hokke-ji (法華寺)
  - Fourth daughter, Nun at Sanji-Chionji-Monzeki Temple
