= Emperor Go-Yōzei =

Emperor of Japan from 1586 to 1611

Emperor Go-Yōzei 後陽成天皇
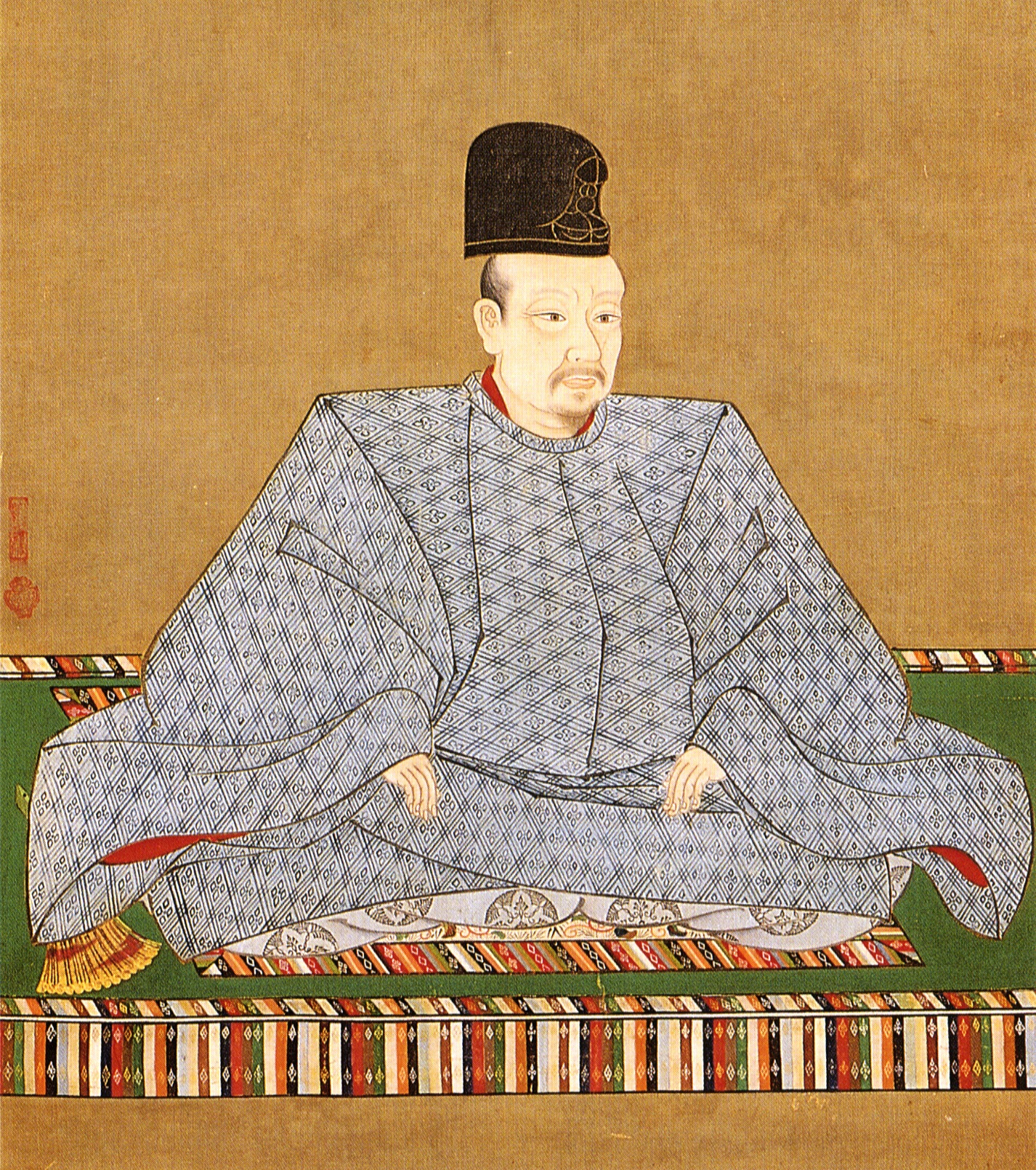
- Portrait by Kanō Takanobu, 1610s

Emperor of Japan
- Reign: December 17, 1586 – May 9, 1611
- Enthronement: January 4, 1587
- Predecessor: Ōgimachi
- Successor: Go-Mizunoo
- Regent: Toyotomi Hideyoshi
- Shōguns: See list: Tokugawa Ieyasu Tokugawa Hidetada
- Born: Katahito (周仁) or Kazuhito (和仁); December 31, 1571; Azuchi–Momoyama period
- Died: September 25, 1617 (aged 45); Kita no gosho, Kyoto, Tokugawa shogunate
- Burial: Fukakusa no kita no Misasagi (深草北陵) Kyoto
- Spouse: Konoe Sakiko (m. 1586)
- Issue more...: Emperor Go-Mizunoo; Konoe Nobuhiro; Ichijō Akiyoshi
Posthumous name
- Tsuigō: Emperor Go-Yōzei (後陽成院 or 後陽成天皇)
- House: Imperial House of Japan
- Father: Prince Masahito
- Mother: Fujiwara no (Kajūji) Haruko
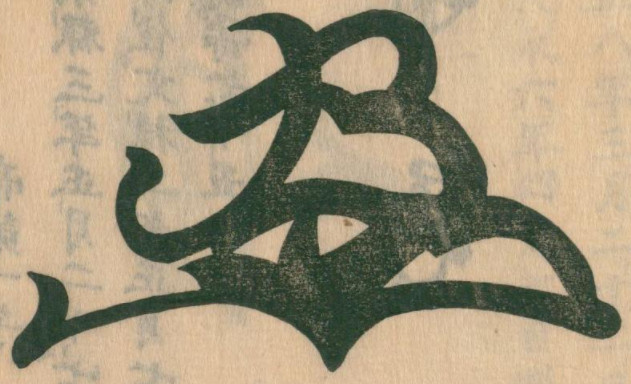
- Signature

Emperor Go-Yōzei (後陽成天皇, Go-Yōzei-tennō; Japanese pronunciation: [ɡo̞jo̞ːze̞ː tẽ̞nːo̞ː]) (December 31, 1571 – September 25, 1617) was the 107th Emperor of Japan, according to the traditional order of succession. Go-Yōzei's reign spanned the years 1586 through to his abdication in 1611, corresponding to the transition between the Azuchi–Momoyama period and the Edo period.

This 16th-century sovereign was named after the 9th-century Emperor Yōzei, and go- (後), translates as later, and thus, he could be called the "Later Emperor Yōzei". The Japanese word go has also been translated to mean the second one, and in some older sources, this emperor may be identified as "Yōzei, the second", or as "Yōzei II".

== Genealogy ==
Before Go-Yōzei's ascension to the Chrysanthemum Throne, his personal name (imina) was Katahito (周仁) or Kazuhito (和仁). He was the eldest son of Prince Masahito (誠仁親王, Masahito-shinnō; 1552–1586), also known as Prince Sanehito and posthumously named Yōkwōin daijō-tennō, who was the eldest son of Emperor Ōgimachi. His mother was a lady-in-waiting.

Go-Yōzei's Imperial family lived with him in the Imperial Palace. The family included at least 35 children.

Consort and issue(s):

- Empress (Nyōgo): Fujiwara (Konoe) Sakiko (藤原近衛 前子)(1575 – 11 August 1630), later Chukamonin (中和門院), daughter of Konoe Sakihisa (近衛 前久)
  - First Daughter: Princess Shōkō (聖興女王; 1590–1594)
  - Second Daughter: Princess Ryūtōin (龍登院宮; 1592–1600)
  - Third Daughter: Imperial Princess Seishi (清子内親王; 1593–1674), married Takatsukasa Nobuhisa
  - Fourth Daughter: Princess Bunkō (文高女王; 1595–1644)
  - Third Son: Imperial Prince Kotohito (政仁親王, 29 June 1596 – 11 September 1680), later Emperor Go-Mizunoo
  - Fifth Daughter: Princess Son'ei (尊英女王; 1598–1611)
  - Fourth Son: Konoe Nobuhiro (近衛 信尋, 24 June 1599 – 15 November 1649)
  - Seventh Son: Imperial Prince Takamatsu-no-miya Yoshihito(29 April 1603 – 14 July 1638; 高松宮好仁親王)
  - Ninth Son: Ichijō Akiyoshi (一条 昭良, 12 June 1605 – 11 March 1672)
  - Sixth Daughter: Imperial Princess Teishi (貞子内親王; 1606–1675) married Nijō Yasumichi
  - Tenth Son: Imperial Prince Morochika (庶愛親王) later Imperial Prince Priest Sonkaku (1608–1661; 尊覚法親王)
  - Twelfth Daughter: Princess Son'ren (尊蓮女王; 1614–1627)
- Consort (Hi): Kiyohara (Furuichi) Taneko (清原古市 胤子, 1583–1658), daughter of Furuichi Tanehide (古市胤栄)
  - Ninth Daughter: Princess Rei'un'in (冷雲院宮; 1611)
  - Eleventh Son: Imperial Prince Priest Dōkō (道晃法親王; 8 April 1612 – 5 August 1679)
  - Tenth Daughter: Princess Kūkain (空花院宮; 1613)
- Consort (Hi): Daughter of Chūtō Tokohiro (中東時広, d. 1680)
  - Twelfth Son: Imperial Prince Priest Dōshū (道周法親王; 1613–1634)
  - Thirteenth Son: Imperial Prince Priest Ji'in (慈胤法親王; 1617–1699)
- Lady-in-waiting (Naishi-no-Suke): Fujiwara (Nakayama) Chikako (藤原中山親子; 1576–1608), daughter of Namayama Oyatsuna (中山親綱)
  - First Son: Imperial Prince Katahito (1588–1648; 良仁親王), later Imperial Prince Priest Kakushin
  - Second Son: Imperial Prince Priest Shōkai (承快法親王; 1591–1609)
- Lady-in-waiting (Naishi-no-Suke): Fujiwara (Hino) Teruko (藤原日野 輝子, 1581–1607), daughter of Hino Terusuke (日野輝資)
  - Fifth Son: Imperial Prince Toshiatsu (1602–1651; 毎敦親王) later Imperial Prince Priest Sonsei (尊性法親王)
- Lady-in-waiting (Naishi-no-Suke): Fujiwara (Jimyōin) Motoko (藤原持明院 基子; d. 1644), daughter of Jimyōin Motonori (持明院基孝)
  - Sixth Son: Imperial Prince Tsuneyoshi (常嘉親王), later Imperial Prince Priest Gyōnen (尭然法親王; 1602–1661)
- Lady-in-waiting (Naishi-no-Suke): Minamoto (Niwata) Tomoko (源庭田 具子; d. 1626), daughter of Niwata Shigetomo (庭田重具)
  - Eight Son: Imperial Prince Priest Ryōjun(良純法親王; 1603–1669)
- Lady-in-waiting (Naishi-no-Suke): Fujiwara (Hamuro) Nobuko (藤原葉室 宣子; d. 1679), daughter of Hamuro Yorinobu (葉室頼宣)
  - Eleventh Daughter: Princess Sonsei (尊清女王; 1613–1669)
- Handmaid (Naishi-no-Jō): Taira (Nishinotōin) Tokiko (平西洞院 時子, d. 1661), daughter of Nishinotōin Tokiyoshi (西洞院時慶)
  - Seventh Daughter: Princess Eishū (永崇女王; 1609–1690)
  - Eighth Daughter: Princess Kō'un'in (高雲院宮; 1610–1612)

== Events of Go-Yōzei's life ==
Prince Katahito became emperor when his grandfather abdicated. The succession (senso) was considered to have been received by the new monarch; and shortly thereafter, Emperor Go-Yōzei is said to have acceded (sokui). A distinct act of senso was unrecognized prior to Emperor Tenji and all sovereigns except Jitō, Yōzei, Go-Toba, and Fushimi have senso and sokui in the same year until the reign of Emperor Go-Murakami. The events during his lifetime shed some light on his reign. The years of Go-Yōzei's reign correspond with the start of the Tokugawa shogunate under the leadership of Tokugawa Ieyasu and Tokugawa Hidetada.

On 31 December 1571, the Imperial prince who became known by the posthumous name of Go-Yōzei-tennō was born. On 5 November 1586, Prince Katahito was given the title Crown Prince and heir and within a month (Tenshō 14, on the 7th day of the 11th month), Ogimachi gave the reins of government to his grandson, who would become Emperor Go-Yōzei. There had been no such Imperial transition since Emperor Go-Hanazono abdicated in 1464 (Kanshō 5). The dearth of abdications is attributable to the disturbed state of the country and because there was neither any dwelling for an ex-emperor nor excess funds in the treasury to support him. In 1586 (Tenshō 14, in the 12th month), a marriage with Lady Asahi, the youngest sister of Toyotomi Hideyoshi, and Tokugawa Ieyasu, was arranged and the kampaku, Toyotomi Hideyoshi, was nominated to be Daijō-daijin (Chancellor of the Realm). In 1588 (Tenshō 16, 7th month), Emperor Go-Yōzei and his father visit Toyotomi Hideyoshi's mansion in Kyoto. This was the first time that an emperor appeared in public since 1521. Hideyoshi led an army to the Kantō where he lay siege to Odawara Castle in 1588 (Tenshō 18, 7th month). When the fortress fell, Hōjō Ujimasa died and his brother, Hōjō Ujinao submitted to Hideyoshi's power, thus ending a period of serial internal warfare which had continued uninterrupted since the Ōnin War (1467–1477).

The Keichō expedition to Korea was en route to invade China in 1592 (Keichō 1). Toyotomi Hideyoshi, the Taikō died in his Fushimi Castle at the age of 63 on 18 September 1598 (Keichō 3, on the 18th day of the 8th month). The Battle of Sekigahara took place in 1600. On 21 October (Keichō 5, 15th day of the 9th month), the Tokugawa clan and its allies decisively vanquished all opposition. Two years later (Keichō 8), the Kyōto Daibutsu was destroyed by fire. Tokugawa Ieyasu became shōgun on 24 March 1603 (Keichō 8), which effectively began what was later known as the Edo bakufu. Toyotomi Hideyori was elevated to Naidaijin in the Imperial court. In 1605 (Keichō 10, 15th day of the 12th month), a new volcanic island, Hachijōko-jima, arose from the sea at the side of Hachijō Island (八丈島 Hachijō-jima) in the Izu Islands (伊豆諸島, Izu-shotō) which stretch south and east from the Izu Peninsula. In 1606 (Keichō 11), construction began on Edo Castle and on Sunpu Castle the following year (Keichō 12). 1609 (Keichō 14) saw the Invasion of Ryukyu by Shimazu daimyō of Satsuma. During the following year (Keichō 15), reconstruction of the Daibutsu hall in Kyōto began and Toyotomi Hideyori came to Kyoto to visit the former-Shogun Tokugawa Ieyasu. On 20 May 1610 (Keichō 15, the 27th day of the 3rd month), the emperor announces his intention to resign in favor of his son Masahito. Go-Yōzei abdicated on 9 May 1611 and his son Prince Masahito received the succession (the senso). Shortly thereafter, Go-Mizunoo formally ascended to the throne (the sokui).

=== Legacy ===
Go-Yōzei's reign corresponds to the rule of Toyotomi Hideyoshi and the beginning of the Edo Bakufu. He was the sovereign who confirmed the legitimacy of their accession to power; and this period allowed the Imperial Family to recover a small portion of its diminished powers. This Emperor gave Toyotomi Hideyoshi the rank of Taikō, originally a title given to the father of the emperor's chief advisor (Kampaku), or a retired Kampaku, which was essential to increase his status and effectively stabilize his power.

When Tokugawa Ieyasu was given the title of Sei-i Taishōgun, the future of any anticipated Tokugawa shogunate was by no means assured, nor was his relationship to the emperor at all settled. He gradually began to interfere in the affairs of the Imperial Court. The right to grant ranks of court nobility and change the era became a concern of the bakufu. However, the Imperial Court's poverty during the Warring States Era seemed likely to become a thing of the past, as the bakufu provided steadily for its financial needs.

Go-Yōzei did abdicate in favor of his third son; but he wanted to be succeeded by his younger brother, Imperial Prince Hachijō-no-miya Toshihito (八条宮智仁親王) (first of the Hachijō-no-miya line, later called Katsura-no-miya), who built the Katsura Imperial Villa.

Go-Yōzei loved literature and art. He published the Kobun Kokyo and part of Nihon Shoki with movable type dedicated to the emperor by Toyotomi Hideyoshi.

After abdication, Go-Yōzei lived for six years in the Sentō Imperial Palace; and thereafter, it became the usual place to which abdicated emperors would retire. The name of this palace and its gardens was Sentō-goshō; and emperors who had abdicated were sometimes called Sentō-goshō. Go-Yōzei died on 25 September 1617. The kami of Emperor Go-Yōzei is enshrined with other emperors at the imperial mausoleum (misasagi) called Fukakusa no kita no misasagi (深草北陵) in Fushimi-ku, Kyoto.

=== Kugyō ===
Kugyō (公卿) is a collective term for the very few most powerful men attached to the court of the Emperor of Japan in pre-Meiji eras. Even during those years in which the court's actual influence outside the palace walls was minimal, the hierarchic organization persisted.

In general, this elite group included only three to four men at a time. These were hereditary courtiers whose experience and background would have brought them to the pinnacle of a life's career. During Go-Hanazono's reign, this apex of the Daijō-kan included:

- Kampaku (Regent for an adult Emperor):
  - Hashiba (Toyotomi) Hideyoshi (1585–1592)
  - Hashiba (Toyotomi) Hidetsugu (1592–1595)
  - Kujō (Fujiwara) Kanetaka (1601–1604)
  - Konoe (Fujiwara) Nobutada (1605–1606)
  - Takatsukasa (Fujiwara) Nobufusa (1606–1609)
  - Kujō (Fujiwara) Tadahide (1609–1612)
- Daijō-daijin (Chancellor):
  - Hashiba (Toyotomi) Hideyoshi (1586–1598)
- Sadaijin (Minister of the Left):
  - Konoe (Fujiwara) Nobusuke (1585–1592)
  - Hashiba (Toyotomi) Hidetsugu (1592–1595)
  - Kujō (Fujiwara) Kanetaka (1601)
  - Konoe Nobutada (formerly Nobusuke, second time, 1601–1605)
  - Takatsukasa (Fujiwara) Nobufusa (1606–1609)
- Udaijin (Minister of the Right):
  - Imadegawa (Fujiwara) Harusue (1585–1595, 1599–1603)
  - Shōgun Tokugawa (Minamoto) Ieyasu (1603)
  - Hashiba (Toyotomi) Hideyori (1605–1607)
  - Kujō (Fujiwara) Tadahide (1607–1612)
- Naidaijin (Minister of the center):
  - Hashiba (Toyotomi) Hideyoshi (1585–1587)
  - Oda (Taira) Nobukatsu (1587–1590)
  - Sanjōnishi Kinkuni (one day in 1588)
  - Hashiba (Toyotomi) Hidetsugu (1592)
  - Tokugawa (Minamoto) Ieyasu (1596–1603)
  - Hashiba (Toyotomi) Hideyori (1603–1605)
  - Shōgun Tokugawa (Minamoto) Hidetada (1605–1606)
  - Takatsukasa (Fujiwara) Nobufusa (1606)
  - Takatsukasa (Fujiwara) Nobuhisa (1611–1612)

== Eras of Go-Yōzei's reign ==
The years of Go-Yōzei's reign are more specifically identified by more than one era name or nengō: Tenshō (1573–1592), Bunroku (1592–1596), and Keichō (1596–1615).

== Ancestry ==
Ancestors of Emperor Go-Yōzei

8. Emperor Go-Nara (1495–1557)
4.Emperor Ōgimachi (1517–1593)
9. Madenokōji Eiko (1494–1522)
2. Prince Masahito (1552–1586)
10. Madenokōji Hidefusa (1492–1563)
5.Madenokōji Fusako (d. 1581)
11. Hatakeyama
1. Emperor Go-Yōzei
12. Kanshūji Tadatoyo (1503–1594)
6. Kanshūji Haruhide (1523–1577)
13. Ise
3. Kanshūji Haruko (1553–1620)
14. Awaya Mototaka
7. Awaya Motoko
15. Kanshūji

== See also ==
- Emperor of Japan
- List of Emperors of Japan
- Imperial cult

Japanese Imperial kamon — a stylized chrysanthemum blossom

Regnal titles
Preceded by Emperor Ōgimachi	Emperor of Japan: Go-Yōzei; 1586–1611	Succeeded by Emperor Go-Mizunoo
