= Kujō Tanemichi =

Kujō Tanemichi (九条 稙通; February 22, 1507 – February 24, 1594), was a kugyō or Japanese court noble and classic scholar of the Muromachi period (1336–1573). He was the biological son of regent Hisatsune and Sanjōnishi Yasuko, eldest daughter of Sanjōnishi Sanetaka (1455–1537), the leading waka master, tea expert and incense expert of his time.

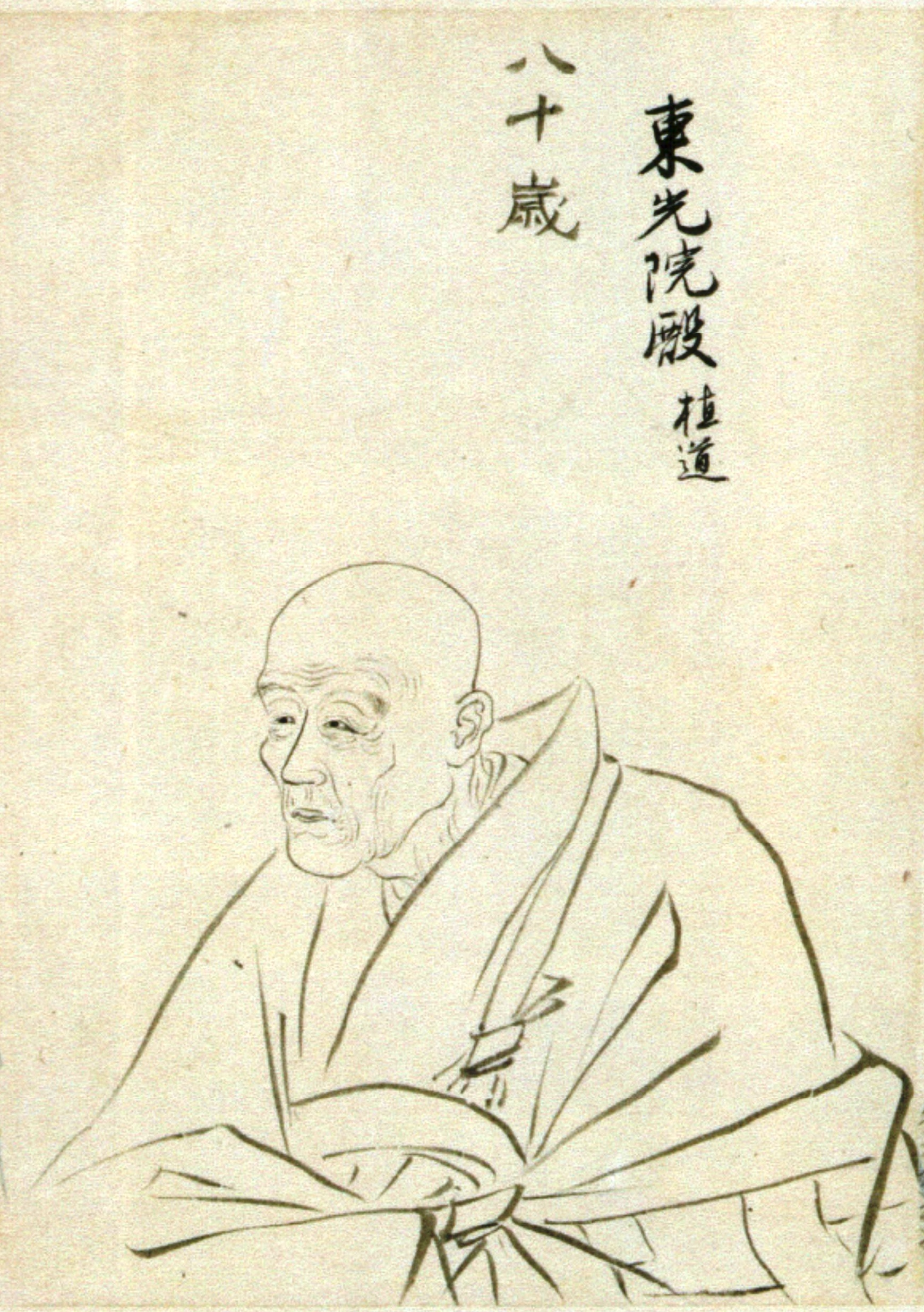

Kujō Tanemichi held a regent position (kampaku) from 1533 to 1534. The calligrapher and poet, Ono Otsu, was one of his students. Kanetaka was his adopted son.

== Family ==
- Father: Kujō Hisatsune
- Mother: Sanjōnishi Yasuko
- Wife: unknown
- child: daughter
- adopted son: Kujō Kanetaka
