= Konoe Sakihisa =

Japanese noble (1536–1612)

- Born: c. 1536
- Died: 7 June 1612 (aged 75–76)

Konoe Sakihisa (近衛 前久) (1536 – June 7, 1612), son of regent Taneie, was a court noble of Japan. His life spanned the Sengoku, Azuchi–Momoyama, and early Edo periods. He served as kampaku-sadaijin and daijō-daijin, rising to the junior first rank. He was kampaku during the reign of Emperor Go-Nara. Konoe Nobutada was his son.

Sakihisa was active in political and military circles. He was a member of the Konoe family, a prominent branch of the Fujiwara clan. His younger sister was the wife of the daimyō Asakura Yoshikage. Sakihisa found favor with Oda Nobunaga, and accompanied him to Kōshū on his campaign against the Takeda clan. His daughter Sakiko was adopted by Toyotomi Hideyoshi and became a consort to Emperor Go-Yōzei, giving birth to his son Emperor Go-Mizunoo.

In 1582, Sakihisa received the appointment to the post of Daijō Daijin. He resigned the post later that year. In 1585, he adopted Hashiba (later Toyotomi) Hideyoshi. This gave Hideyoshi the Fujiwara legitimacy, clearing the way for his appointment as kampaku.

== Family ==
Parents

- Father: Konoe Taneie (近衛 稙家, 1503 – 1566)
- Mother: Kuga Keiko (久我慶子), Kuga Tsugen's daughter (久我通言)

Consorts and issue

- Wife: Kita no Mandoroko (北政所)
- Concubine: Court lady (家女房), Hatano Sōshichi's daughter (波多野惣七)
  - Son: Konoe Nobutada (近衛信尹; 1565-1614)
- Concubine: Wakanabe Takeda's daughter (若狹武田氏)
  - Daughter: Konoe Sakiko (近衛 前子)(1575 – August 11, 1630) also known as Chūwamon’in (中和門院) – consort of Emperor Go –Yozei
- Concubine: Unknown
  - Son: Mikotozei (尊勢;d.1616), a priest at Kōfuku-ji
  - Daughter: Lady Koshoin (光照院)
  - Daughter: Unknown
