= Konoe Nobutada =

Japanese courtier and calligrapher

Konoe Nobutada (近衛 信尹; 1565 – 1614) was a Momoyama period Japanese courtier known as a poet, calligrapher, painter and diarist. Having no legitimate son, he adopted his nephew Nobuhiro as his heir. Other names he is known by are Nobumoto (信基) and Nobusuke (信輔) in his early life, and Sanmyakuin (三藐院), his title in his late period.

In Japanese calligraphy he is distinguished as one of the Kan'ei Sanpitsu (寛永三筆) or "Three Brushes of the Kan'ei period", named in imitation of the Heian period Sanpitsu.

== Family and early life ==
He is a son of Konoe Sakihisa by a lady of waiting whose name is unknown. 1577 he held his genpuku and was named Nobumoto. Oda Nobunaga led the ceremony and gave one letter of his name 信 (Nobu) to the young noble. Later he changed his name Nobusuke. In 1580 he was appointed to naidaijin, in 1585 sadaijin respectively. He held the position of sadaijin until 1591. He was also the tutor of the noble lady, calligrapher and poet, Ono Otsu.

In 1585 he got into trouble with kanpaku Nijō Akizane in relation to Toyotomi Hideyoshi and his planned appointment to sadaijin, the position Nobusuke held at the time of the dispute, today known as kanpaku sōron (関白相論). The court meant to appoint Nobusuke to kanpaku succeeding to Nijō Akizane who had been appointed to this position this year. Generally this succession seemed inevitable but the two disagreed in details. Both issued their opinion in letters to the court and the dispute was not settled. Then both visited Hideyoshi to justify each of their opinions. Consequently, Hideyoshi asked for kanpaku position instead of sadaijin which the court had originally meant to give him. For enabling this appointment, since only males of Sekke was considered to be eligible to kanpaku position, Hideyoshi also asked for adoption to Konoe Sakihisa, the father of Nobutada and the contemporary family head of the Konoe, with a promise that Nobusuke would succeed to Hideyoshi as kanpaku. This promise didn't come true and Toyotomi Hidetsugu, a nephew of Hideyoshi was appointed to kanpaku in 1591. In this year in disappointment Nobutada resigned from sadaijin and entered into his retirement.

== Late life ==
In 1594 Nobutada angered Emperor Go-Yōzei and was exiled to Bonotsu in Satsuma province, Kyūshū. He stayed there for three years. In September 1596 he received the imperial permission to return to Kyoto and held his sadaijin position again. In 1605 he was appointed to kanpaku.
