= Prince Sanehito =

Prince Masahito
- Yōkōin daijō-tennō
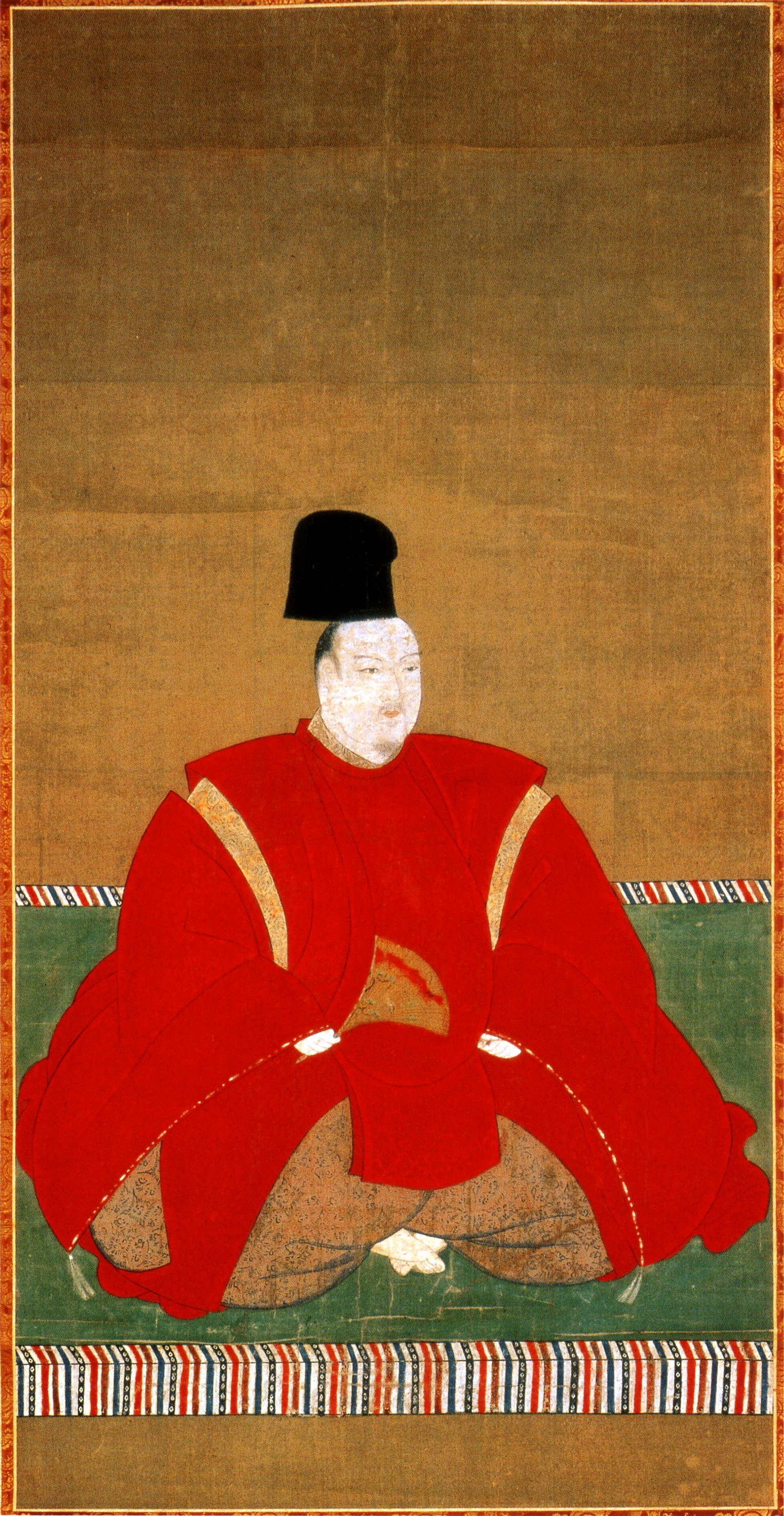
- Prince Masahito, also known as Yōkōin daijō-tennō
- Born: 16 May 1552
- Died: 7 September 1586 (aged 34)
- Spouse: Fujiwara Haruko; Naishi No Tsubone
- Issue: Emperor Go-Yōzei; Prince Hachijō Toshihito
- Father: Emperor Ōgimachi
- Mother: Madenokōji (Fujiwara) Fusako

Prince Masahito (誠仁親王, Masahito-shinnō; 16 May 1552 – 7 September 1586), also known as Prince Sanehito and posthumously named Yōkōin daijō-tennō, was the eldest son of Emperor Ōgimachi. He predeceased his father.

Masahito's eldest son was Imperial Prince Kazuhito (和仁親王, Kazuhito-shinnō; 1572–1617), who acceded to the Chrysanthemum Throne on the abdication of Emperor Ōgimachi. Kazuhito would become known as Emperor Go-Yōzei.

Later, Go-Yōzei elevated the rank of his father, even though his father's untimely death made this impossible in life. In this manner, Go-Yōzei himself could enjoy the polite fiction of being the son of an emperor.

- 21–25 August 1598 (Keichō 3, 20-24th day of the 7th month): Buddhist rituals were performed in the Seriyoden of the Imperial Palace to celebrate the 13th anniversary of the death of the emperor's father.

The actual site of Prince Masahito's grave is known. This posthumously elevated emperor is traditionally venerated at a memorial Shinto shrine (misasagi) at Kyoto.

The Imperial Household Agency designates this location as Yōkōin's mausoleum. It is formally named Tsuki no wa no misasagi at Sennyū-ji.

== Genealogy ==
Parents

- Father: Emperor Ogimachi (正親町天皇, 18 June 1517 – 6 February 1593)
- Mother: Fujiwara Fusako (万里小路 房子; d.1580)

Consort and issue(s):

- Wife (Nyobō): Fujiwara no (Kajūji) Haruko (藤原勧修寺 晴子, 1553 – 21 March 1660), later Jōtōmon'in (上東門院)
  - Daughter: Princess Eichu (永卲女王, 1569 – 1580)
  - First Son: Imperial Prince Kazuhito (和仁親王, 31 December 1571 – 25 September 1617)
  - Second Son: Imperial Prince Kusei (空性法親王, 1573 – 1650)
  - Third Son: Imperial Prince Priest Ryōjo (良恕法親王, 1574 – 1643)
  - Fourth Son: Unnamed Prince (b.1575)
  - Fifth Son: Imperial Prince Priest Kyo-i (興意法親王, 1576 – 1620)
  - Daughter: Unnamed Princess (b. 1577)
  - Sixth Son: Prince Hachijō Toshihito (八条宮 智仁親王, 3 February 1579 – 29 May 1629)
  - Daughter: Unnamed Princess (b. 1580)
  - Daughter: Unnamed Princess (1581 – 1584)
  - Daughter: Unnamed Princess (b. 1583)
  - Daughter: Unnamed Princess (b.1584)
  - Daughter: Unnamed Princess
- Wife (Nyobō): Naishi No Tsubone (典侍局, 1565 – 9 March 1616), daughter of Tamematsu Reizei (冷泉為益)
  - Daughter: Unnamed Princess (d. 1579)
  - Third Daughter: Princess Shigetsu (心月女王, 1580 – 1590)

== Ancestry ==
Ancestors of Prince Sanehito

16. Emperor Go-Tsuchimikado (1442–1500)
8. Emperor Go-Kashiwabara (1462–1526)
17. Niwata Asako (1437–1492)
4.Emperor Go-Nara (1495–1557)
18. Kanshūji Norihide (1426–1496)
9. Kanshūji Fujiko (1464–1535)
19. Asukai
2. Emperor Ōgimachi (1517–1593)
20. Kanshūji Norihide (1426–1496)
10. Madenokōji Katafusa (1466–1507)
21. Asukai
5.Madenokōji Eiko (1494–1522)
22. Kikkawa Tsunemoto (1428–1520)
11. Kikkawa
23. Sawa
1. Prince Masahito
24. Kanshūji Norihide (1426–1496)
12. Madenokōji Katafusa (1466–1507)
25. Asukai
6.Madenokōji Hidefusa (1492-1563)
26. Kikkawa Tsunemoto (1428–1520)
13. Kikkawa
27. Sawa
3.Madenokōji Fusako (d. 1581)
7. Hatakeyama
