= Kujō Kanetaka =

Japanese noble (1553 – 1636)

Kujō Kanetaka (九条 兼孝; 25 December 1553 – 23 February 1636), son of Nijō Haruyoshi and adopted son of regent Tanemichi, was a kugyō or Japanese court noble of the Azuchi-Momoyama (1568–1603) and Edo periods (1603–1868). He held a regent position kampaku from 1578 to 1581 and from 1600 to 1604. Yukiie was his son.

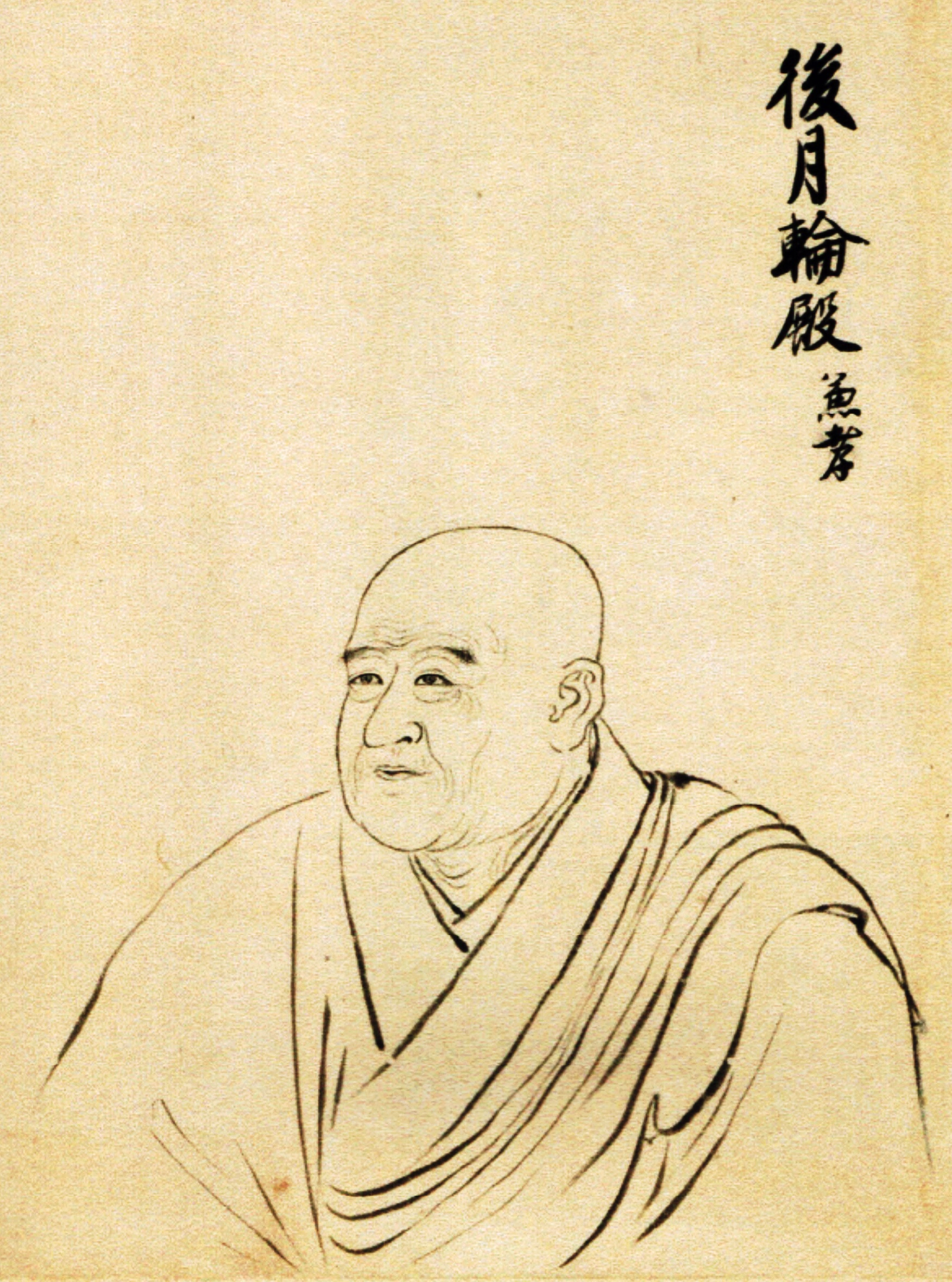

== Family ==
- Father: Nijō Haruyoshi
- Foster father: Kujō Tanemichi
- Mother: Fushimi-no-miya-Iko
- Wife: Takakura Hiroko
- Children (all by Takakura Hiroko):
  - Kujō Yukiie
  - son (増孝, 1569-1644)
  - daughter married Prince Hachijō Toshihito
