= Katsura Imperial Villa =

Building in Nishikyo-ku, Kyoto Prefecture, Japan

- Katsura Imperial Villa (桂離宮, Katsura Rikyū)
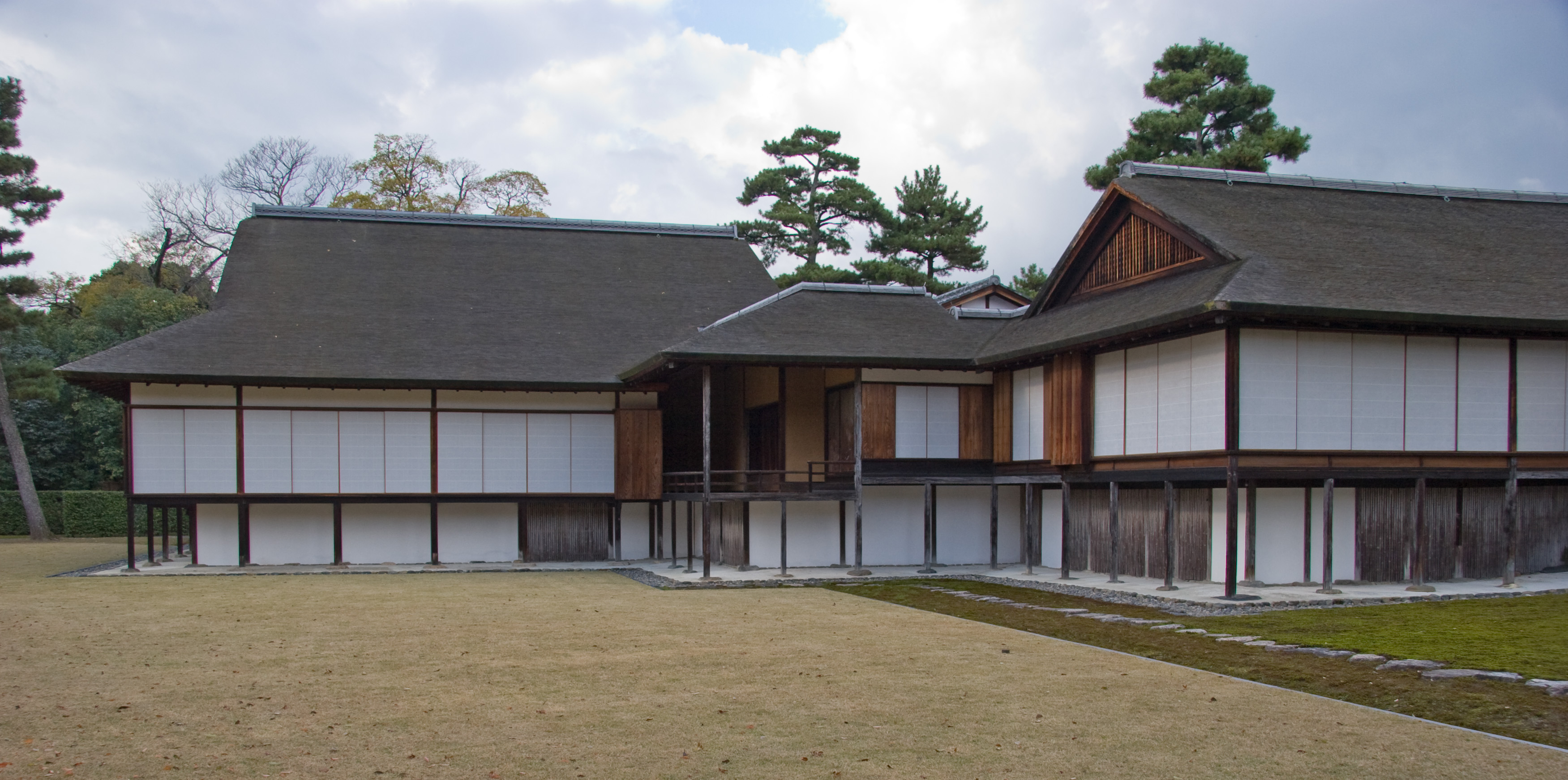
- The Shoin
- Interactive map of Katsura Imperial Villa
- Type: Japanese garden
- Location: Kyoto, Japan
- Coordinates: 34°59′02″N 135°42′34″E
- Created: 17th Century

The Katsura Imperial Villa or Katsura Detached Palace (桂離宮, Katsura Rikyū; Japanese pronunciation: [ka.tsɯ.ɾa ɾʲiꜜ.kʲɯː]) is an Imperial residence with associated gardens and outbuildings in the western suburbs of Kyoto, Japan. Located on the western bank of the Katsura River in Katsura, Nishikyō-ku, the Villa is 8km distant from the main Kyoto Imperial Palace. The villa and gardens are nationally recognized as an Important Cultural Property of Japan.

The grounds of the villa are regarded as a notable exemplar of traditional Japanese gardening. Tea ceremony houses within the strolling gardens and the main villa itself are all sited to maximize appreciation of varied foliage and changing seasonal vistas.

The palace originally belonged to the prince of the Hachijō-no-miya (八条宮) family. The Imperial Household Agency currently administers the site. Although the Imperial Villa itself is not open to visitors, public tours of the gardens are available by appointment.

== History ==
The Katsura district of Kyoto has long been favored for villas, and in the Heian period, Fujiwara no Michinaga had a villa there. The members of the Heian court found it an elegant location for viewing the Moon.

Prince Hachijō Toshihito (智仁; 1579–1629), the founder of the Katsura Imperial Villa, was born on 13 February 1579. He was the sixth son of Prince Sanehito, and a descendant of Emperor Ogimachi. In 1586, Toshihito was adopted by Hideyoshi Toyotomi, but they separated in 1589 when Hideyoshi had his own son. He presented Toshihito with land that yielded 3000 koku (15,000 bushels of rice) and allowed him to establish a new house in the imperial line, which became the Hachijo family line.

From an early age, Prince Toshihito was very familiar with the Tales of Genji, the Poems of Past and Present, and the works of Po Chu-i. He was incredibly fond of these works, and was said to copy passages from the works for leisure. One such passage, from the Tales of Genji, had written:

Far away, in the country village of Katsura, the reflection of the moon upon the water is clear and tranquil.

When Toshihito obtained land along the south bank of the Katsura River, the location of the novel the Tales of Genji, he set out to construct a villa modeled on passages from it. However, because he lacked wealth and resources, the first constructed villa was similar to "a teahouse in the melon patch". However, after the marriage of Tokugawa Kazuko to Emperor Go-Mizunoo, which Toshihito had been active in creating, construction of the villa began. As Prince Toshihito became a greater figure in public life, more guests came to visit the Katsura Imperial Villa. By 1624, he had devoted more of his resources to the expansion of the villa, and it was recorded that hills had been formed and a pond had been dug in the middle of the garden. A priest that visited Katsura in 1624 wrote that it had the "finest view in Japan". By 1631, the villa was called a "palace".

Prince Toshihito died in 1629, when his son Toshitada (also called Noritada) was ten years old. Because he was only a child, Toshitada made little use of the garden, and the villa was allowed to deteriorate badly. However, he shared the same interests as his father, and visited the villa by 1641. After marrying the daughter of Lord Kaga, which greatly increased his income, he set out to renovate the imperial villa. With the section of the villa his father built known as the "Old Shoin", Toshitada constructed the main house, as well as several teahouses, and these became part of the section called the "Middle Shoin". After these renovations, the fame of the Katsura villa grew.

In 1654, Toshitada adopted Prince Sachi, one of the ex-Emperor Go-Mizunoo’s many sons, and a few years afterwards, Go-Mizunoo decided to visit. It is said that the New Palace, also called the "Imperial-Visit Palace", was built to accommodate the ex-Emperor while he was visiting. Prince Toshitada died in 1662, and his heir died a few years later. After this, the fourth and fifth generation princes died in their teens, making additions to the Katsura Imperial Villa impossible. However, the seventh generation prince, Prince Yakahito, visited the villa numerous times and made repairs to it, leaving most of the layout in its original form.

The Hachijō-no-miya house changed its name to Tokiwai-no-miya (常磐井宮), Kyōgoku-no-miya (京極宮), and finally Katsura-no-miya (桂宮), before the line died out in 1881. The Imperial Household Ministry took control of the Katsura Detached Palace in 1883, and since World War II, the Imperial Household Agency has been in control.

== Connections to traditional Japanese and Buddhist ideas ==
The Katsura Imperial Villa is a good example of the essence of Japanese traditional design. The Villa combines principles usually used in early Shinto shrines and merges it with the esthetics and philosophy of Zen Buddhism.

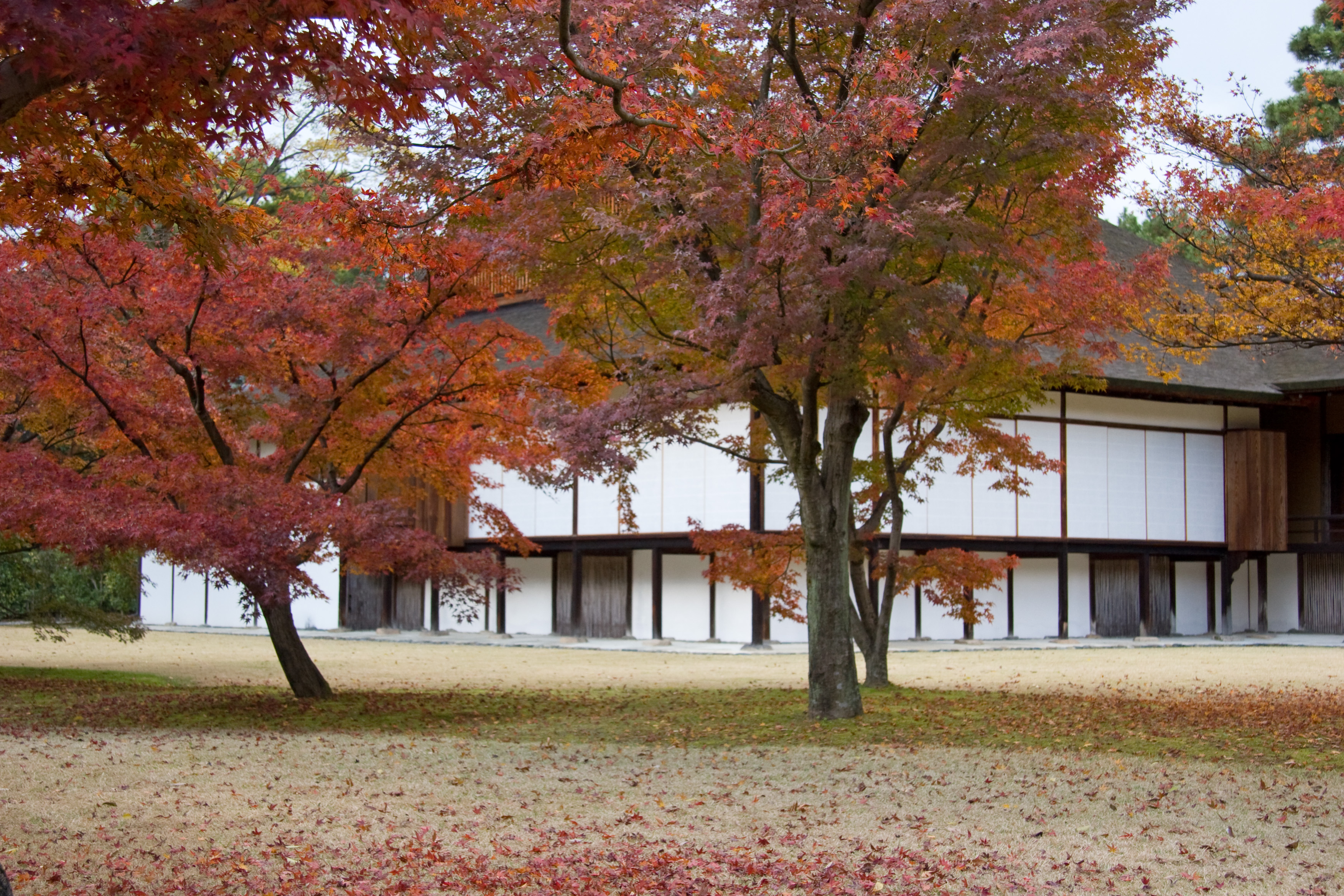
Katsura Rikyu

Villa incorporates many traditional Japanese ideas. One example of Katsura's use of traditional ideas is its use of raised floors with tatami mats covering them. Tatami are mats approximately 3 feet by 6 feet in length that are not only used as the floors of the villa, but are also used to define the dimensions of each individual room and the house as a whole. At Katsura, the mats are used to create the sprawling and pinwheel-like plan that it has today. The terraces and porches created by the arrangement of the tatami mats provide opportunities to view the landscape and link interior spaces with the outside world. The floors of each building of the site are also raised as well, which originally was derived from vernacular designs for granaries, as well as early imperial palaces. They serve the purpose of both keeping the floor dry while also giving hierarchy to the space. Another classic characteristic that the Katsura Imperial Villa utilizes is the use of screen walls (the shōji and the fusuma). In traditional Japanese Architecture, the shoji and the fusuma are used to separate the spaces created by the tatami mat into the various rooms of the house. The shoji is the generic term for the white and translucent screen door or wall that is reinforced with wooden lattice and can either be stationary, hanging, or sliding. The fusuma is a subcategory of the shoji and it is the white or painted moving screen partition used on the interior of the house. By moving the fusuma, when in conjunction with a stationary shoji, the resident is able to create new rooms within the architecture. For instance by moving one fusuma wall, one could transform two rooms into one large room and a small storage closet. In the Katsura Imperial Villa, the fusuma allows the rooms to change and open up to the natural world with exterior decks becoming extensions of the interior and framing views of the landscape. An example of this type of transformation is the moon viewing platform connected to the Old Shoin. Besides these characteristics, there are many traditional Japanese ideas that are used in the Katsura Imperial Villa, like the decorative alcove (tokonoma), built-in desk (tsukeshoin) and square posts.

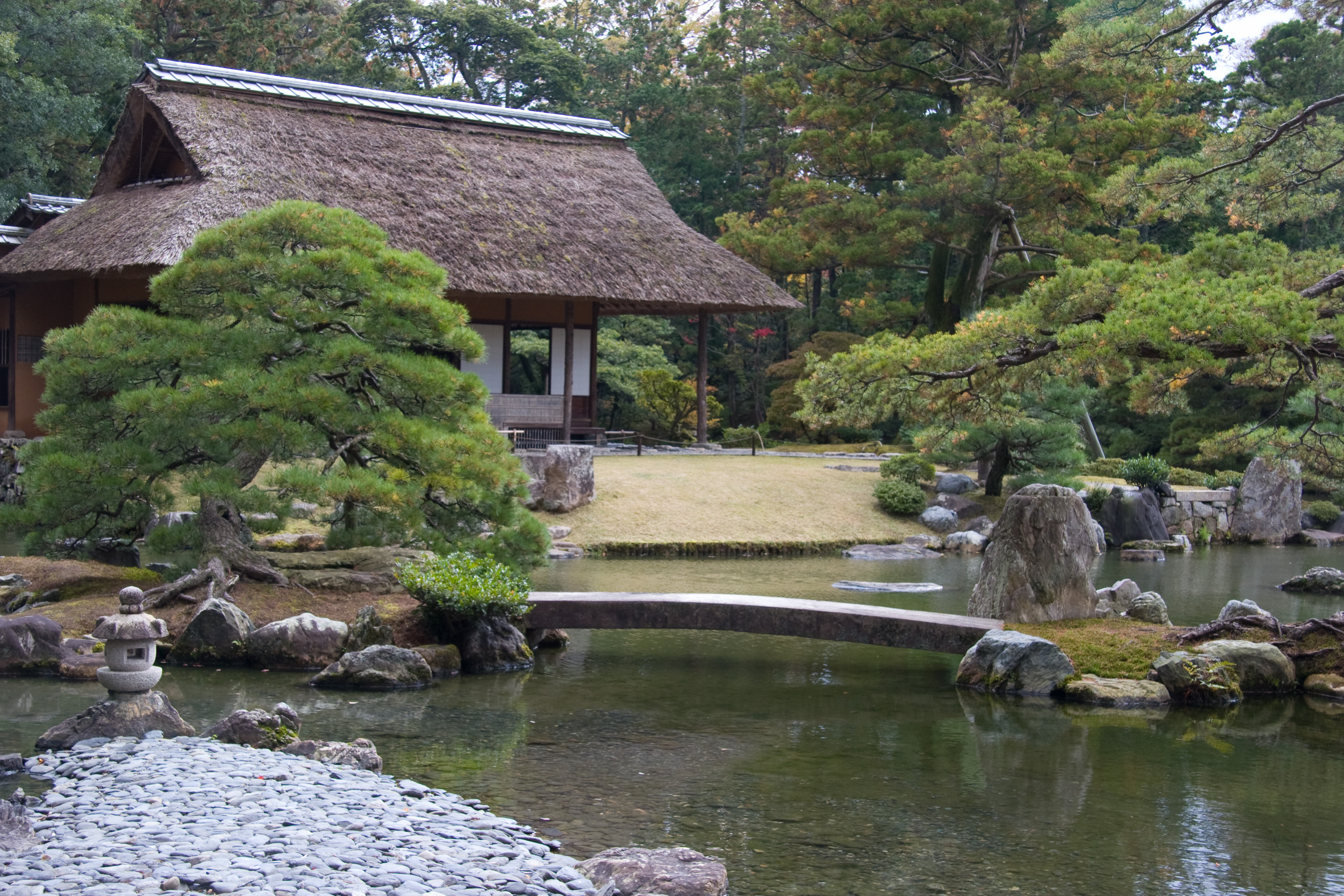
Teahouse

At the Katsura Imperial Villa, the teahouses are perfect examples of how Zen Buddhism has affected the architecture and landscape. The tea ceremony, performed at the pavilions, is a very important part of Japanese society because it is a spiritual ritual symbolizing detached perfection in the Zen tradition, and it has greatly affected the architecture and landscape around it to enhance the experience one receives while in the ceremony. The teahouses were constructed expressly to incorporate the qualities of concord, reverence, pureness, and isolation that are the very essence of the ritual. The four different teahouses are all separated from the main building and are isolated from everything except for the nature around them; to reach each building, one must take a path that doesn't reveal the view of the pavilion until the very last moment. The teahouses also use rustic elements such as bark covered wooden supports or irregular shaped wooden pieces as extensions of the natural world, for the tea ceremony aims at fusing the spiritual and the natural. Additionally, the teahouses account for many experiences while you are inside of it. The windows and apertures in the pavilion are at eye level when sitting so that one can feel more in tune and closer to nature and so that one can "admire the cherry blossoms in the spring and the crimson leaves in the autumn… while preparing tea and enjoying exquisite cuisine". Finally, the interior of the buildings were planned so that the designers imparted their reverence for the materials and spatial harmony, which are intended to promote reflection that will achieve inward simplicity and tranquillity of the mind.

== Buildings and gardens ==
The Old Shoin, Middle Shoin and New Palace are each in the shoin style, with irimoya kokerabuki (柿葺) roofs.

The Old Shoin was constructed by Prince Toshihito. It is composed of rooms with nine, ten, and fifteen tatami, and has ceilings supported by wooden slats. On the southern side, there is a room with a veranda attached, which shows elements of the sukiya style. A bamboo platform, created for moon-viewing, extends beyond the veranda. The Old Shoin was most likely built to accommodate a large number of people at informal gatherings.

Compared to the Old Shoin, The Middle Shoin appears stiff. It is arranged in an L-shape, and at one end there is a tokonoma, and to its right there is a chigaidana (a staggered group of ornamental shelves). The walls of the tokonoma and chigaidana are decorated with ink paintings of landscapes, as well as the Seven Sages of the Bamboo Grove. The Middle Shoin is said to have been built as the prince's living quarters, which is evidenced by a bath and toilet. A veranda ran along two sides of the Middle Shoin and faced the garden.

The New Palace features a large hipped-and-gabled roof, as well as a veranda enclosed by wooden shutters. The design of the New Palace is more structured than the Old and Middle Shoin, and is composed of an eight-mat room, a six-mat room, and a three-mat area that are arranged into an L-shape. There is a coffered ceiling, and an alcove containing a large window. The Katsura Shelves are especially noteworthy, and are located in the corner opposite of the entrance. Other rooms in the New Palace are the imperial bedchamber, the consort’s dressing room, a pantry, a wardrobe, a bath, a toilet, and a washroom.

Within the garden, there were originally five teahouses. Although currently there are only four standing, the pavilions were implemented for practicing the Japanese art of the tea ceremony. The small structures were built to incorporate qualities that are at the essence of the tea ritual, such as harmony, silence, and reverence. Additionally, the tea rituals tried to incorporate the spiritual and natural world, therefore, the teahouses used natural elements such as wooden supports with bark, continuing the atmosphere of the garden.

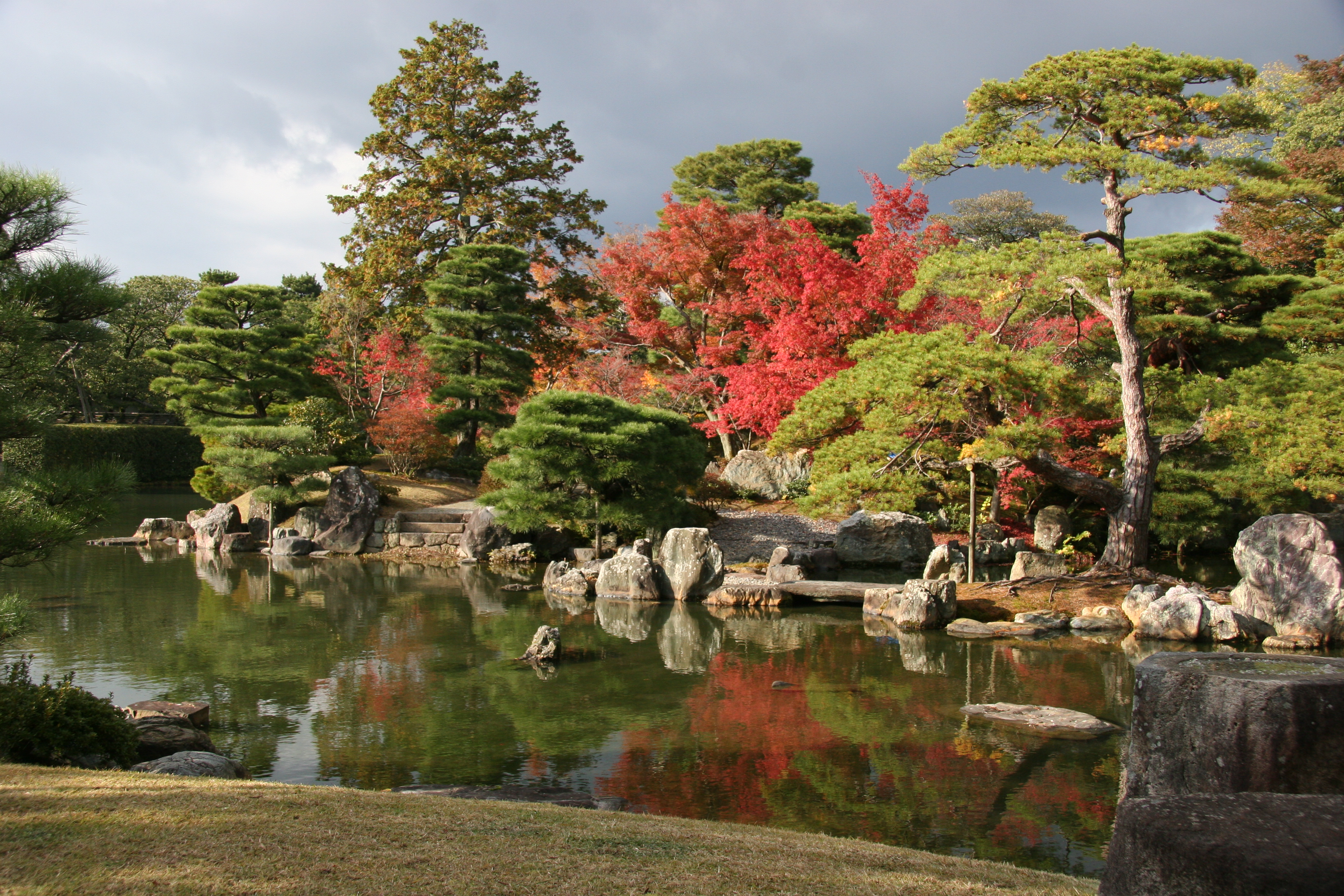
The pond

The Geppa-rō, also known as the "Moon-wave Tower," has a view overlooking the pond. Although it is only fifteen by twenty-four feet in area, it is known for its spatial effect due to its exposed ceiling and roof structure. The roof is supported by four slanting beams that rise from the corners of the building with a ridge pole that is further supported by a curving king pole resting on a tie beam. This creates a unique spatial effect as the roof has a decorated underside that exposes the beams and rafters.

Across the pond from the Geppa-rō is the Shōkin-tei, also known as the "Pine-Lute Pavilion." The pavilions contrast one another, as the Geppa-rō is active and situated on higher ground looking down onto the pond whereas the Shōkin-tei is less active and elevated not far above the water level. The site in which the Shōkin-tei is located was initially the first point in which the visitors could view the pond. But through the development of the land, such as extending the pond to the southwest and reconstruction of the main house, the entire site developed into a tour garden rather than a view garden. It intends for one to walk through the space rather than just view it from the interior of a house. The most prominent and unusual aspect of the teahouse is the unfloored loggia. It is facing the pond with an open pantry in the center for tea ceremonies. This was very unusual to have in view of the tea drinkers and not in the back of the house. Additionally, three oak logs in their natural states support the extended eaves of the loggia. With the thatched roof, the roughness of the pavilion resembles a rustic kiosk. A prominent feature in the interior is the heavy papering with a blue-and-white checkered pattern on walls of the tokonoma and sliding doors between the First and Second rooms.

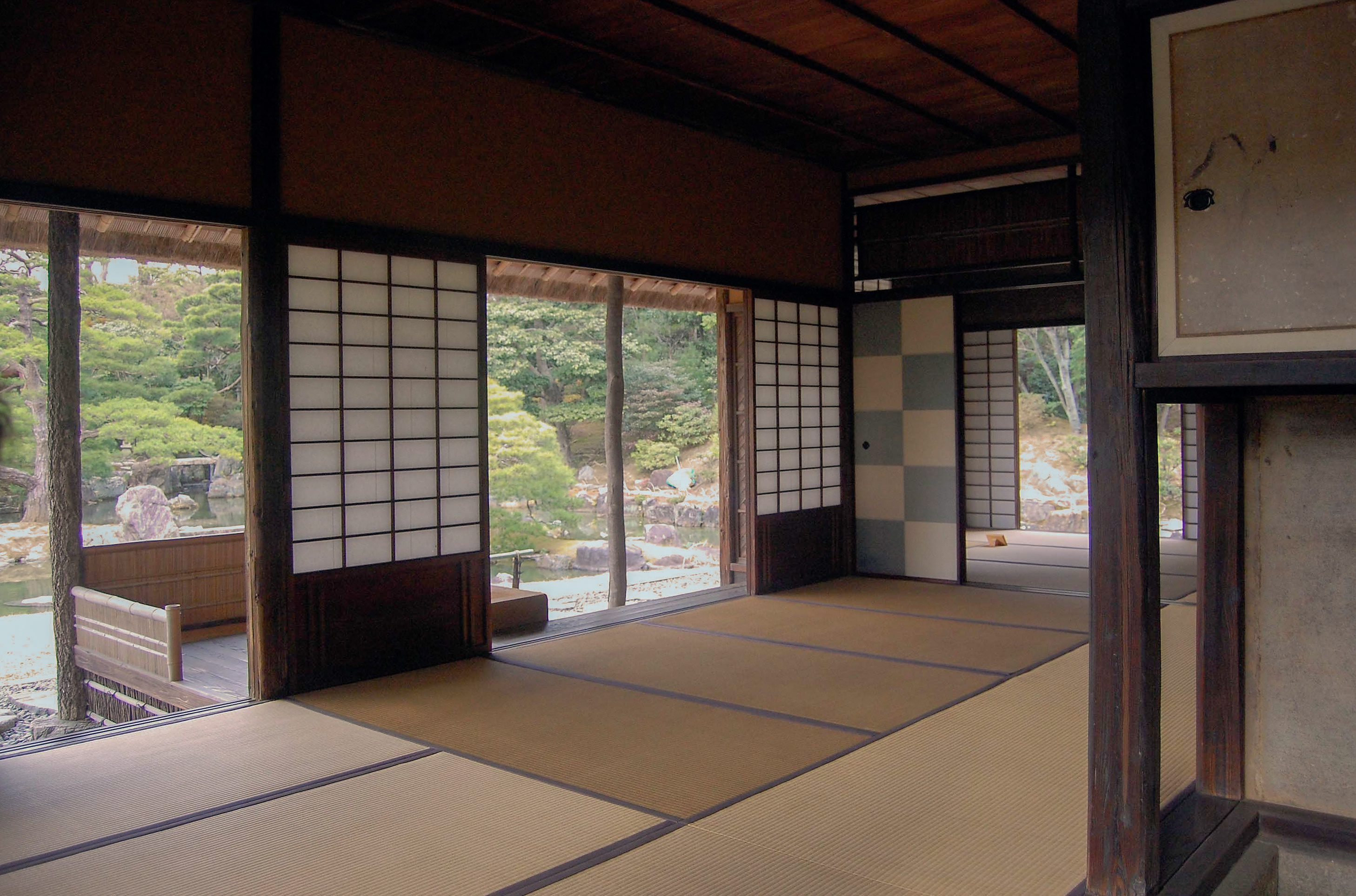
Inside the Shōkin-tei

Leaving the Shōkin-tei, one follows up a "mountain path" to the Shōka-tei, which roughly means "Flower-Appreciation Pavilion," as cherry trees surround it. It is a small teahouse that is situated at the highest point in the garden. It has the clearest view of the main house through the trees. The posts are barked logs, as the floor plan is made of only four tatami mats in a U-shaped pattern. Emphasizing the atmosphere of a mountain house, strips of dark blue and white cloth are hung on the front of the pavilion.

As the path away from the Shōka-tei splits, the right leads to the front lawn of the main house, while the left leads to the Onrin-dō, a small ancestral shrine. Following this shrine, there is an open area leading to the Shōiken. It is also referred to as the "Laughing Thoughts Pavilion." The upper wall of the entry room has uncharacteristic row of six round windows, giving the approaching visitor a feeling that the building is laughing at them. This particular pavilion is different from the others not in appearance but in the arrangement of rooms. From a processing of a narrow toilet to wider rooms to the kitchen and servant quarters, the pavilion appears to operate as an independent house. A small room with a shoin window overlooks the farmlands outside the grounds, connecting the viewer psychologically with the real world rather than the garden.

== Influence outside Japan ==
The buildings, and to a much lesser extent the gardens of Katsura, became a reference point for a number of well known modernist architects in the 20th century through a book published in 1934 by German architect Bruno Taut. Taut arrived in Japan at Tsuruga port on 3 May 1934. On only his second day in the country he was taken to visit the Katsura villa by members of Japan’s International Architectural Society. To the delight of his hosts Taut promptly declared the villa an unparalleled Japanese modernist archetype. In his subsequent publication of ‘Nippon’ and later ‘Personal views on Japanese Culture’ Taut did much to spread the view of the Katsura villa as a symbol of a uniquely Japanese approach to architecture.

Le Corbusier and later Walter Gropius, who visited in 1953, also found inspiration in the minimal and orthogonal design of the buildings at Katsura. Subsequently, Katsura become well known to a second wave of architects from Australia such as Philip Cox, Peter Muller and Neville Gruzman who visited in the late 1950s and 1960s.

The Katsura villa was also cited as lasting influence of Irish architect Ronnie Tallon who described his many visits to the villa as "like going to Lourdes for a cure". Tallon’s architectural homage to the influence of the Katsura buildings; the PJ Carroll Tobacco cigarette factory in Dundalk.

The home of Larry Ellison in Woodside, California is a replica of the entire Katsura villa, covering twenty-three acres.

== Gallery ==
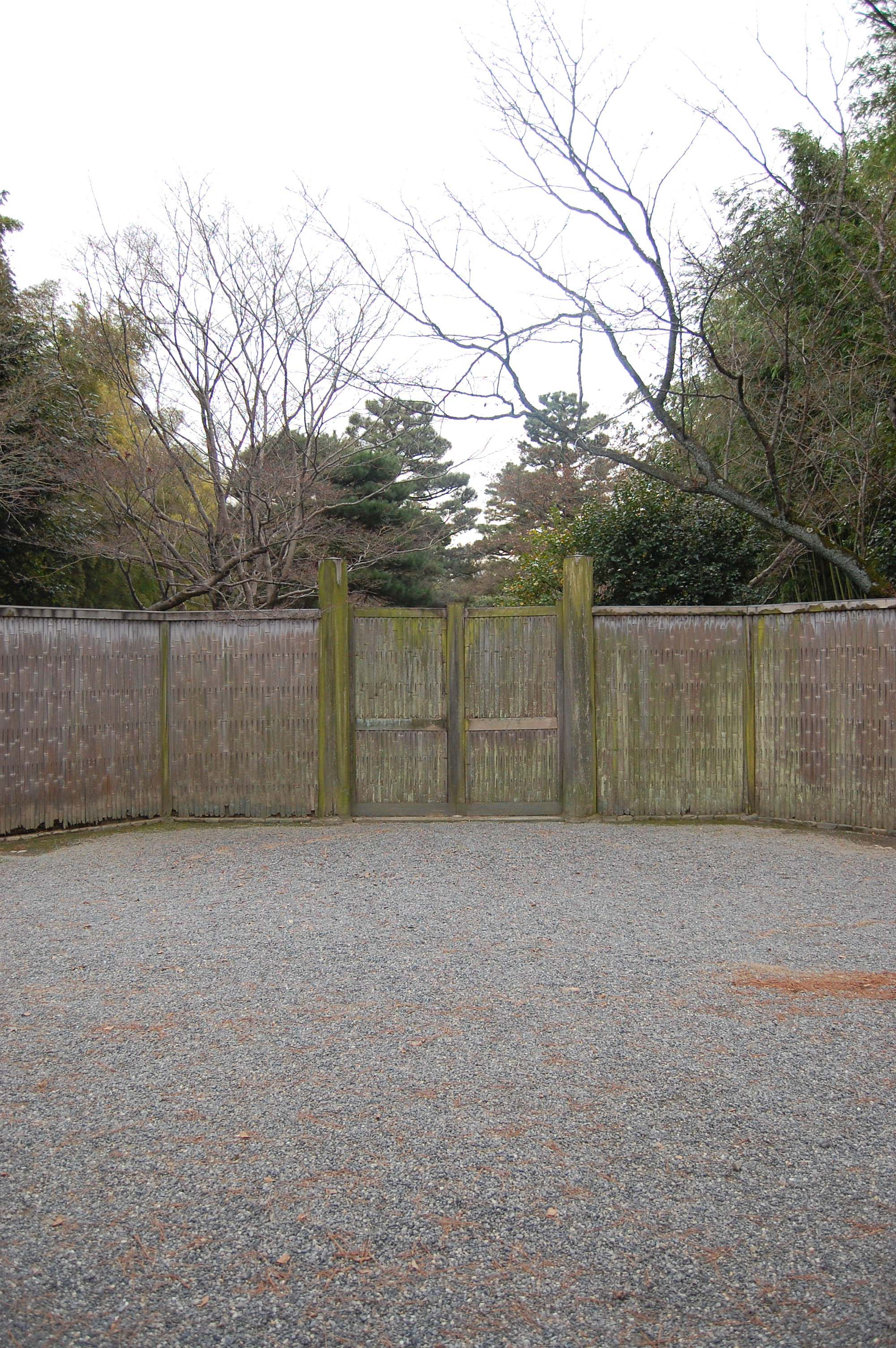
Main gate of the Katsura Imperial Villa

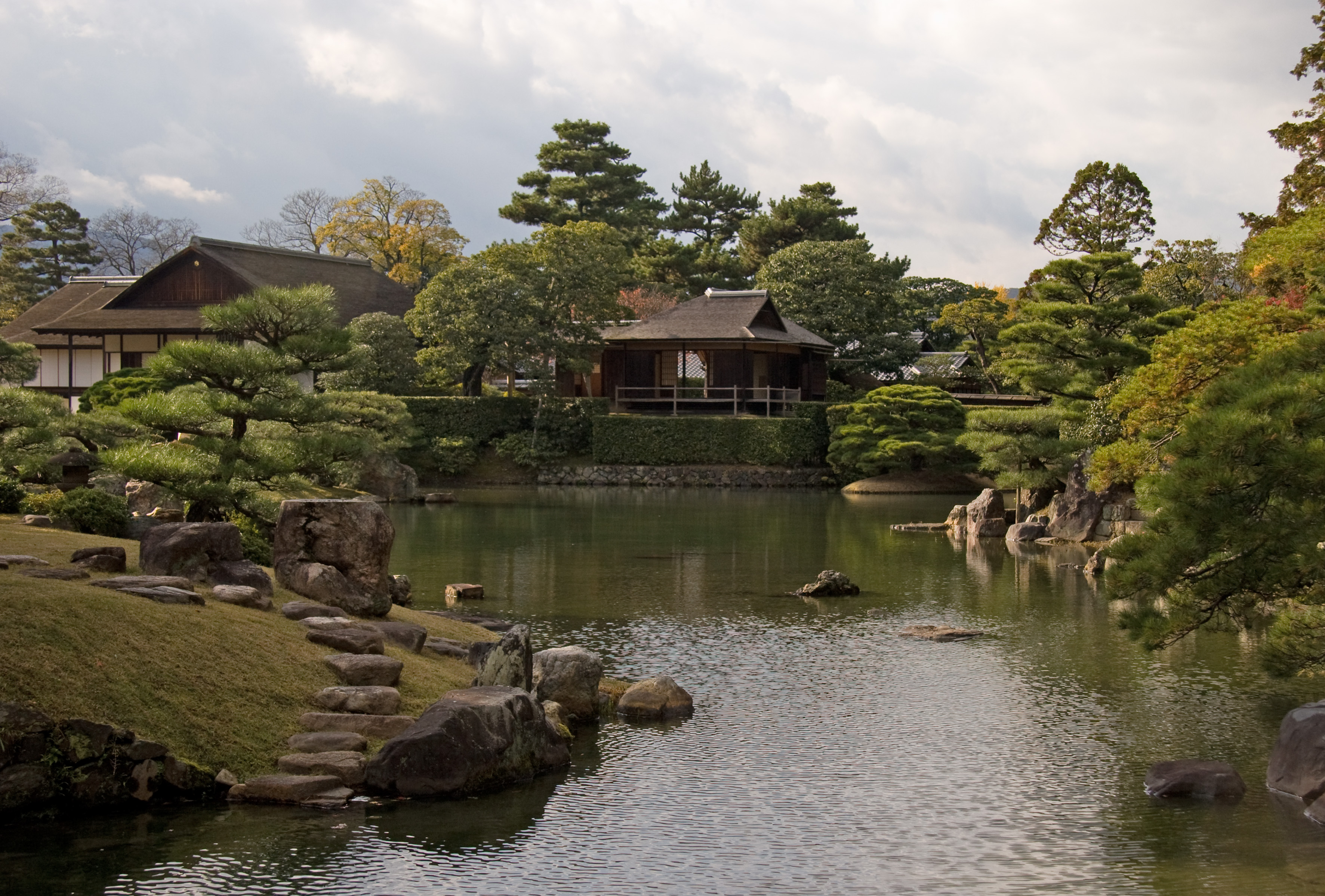
Katsura Imperial Villa

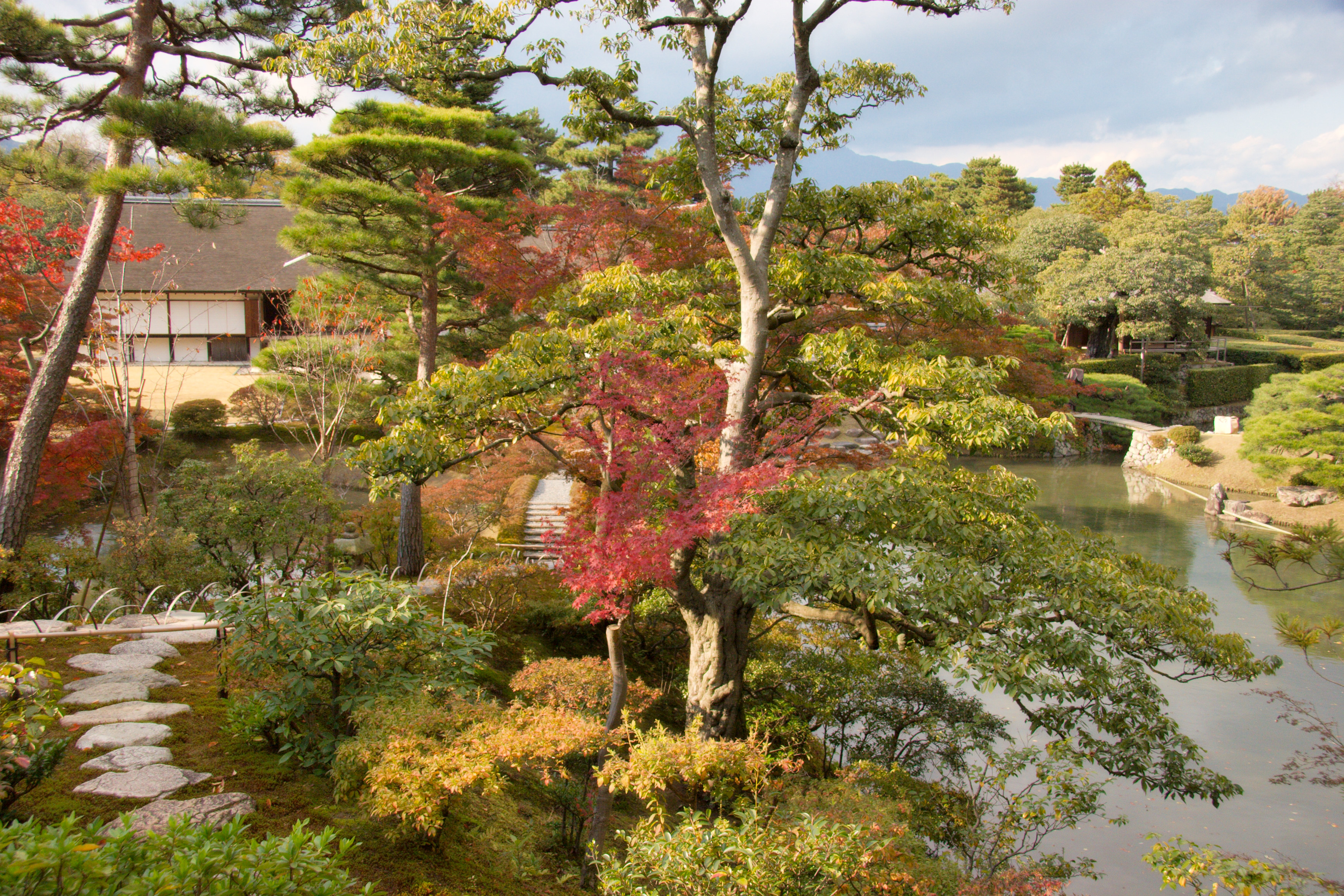
View of the garden

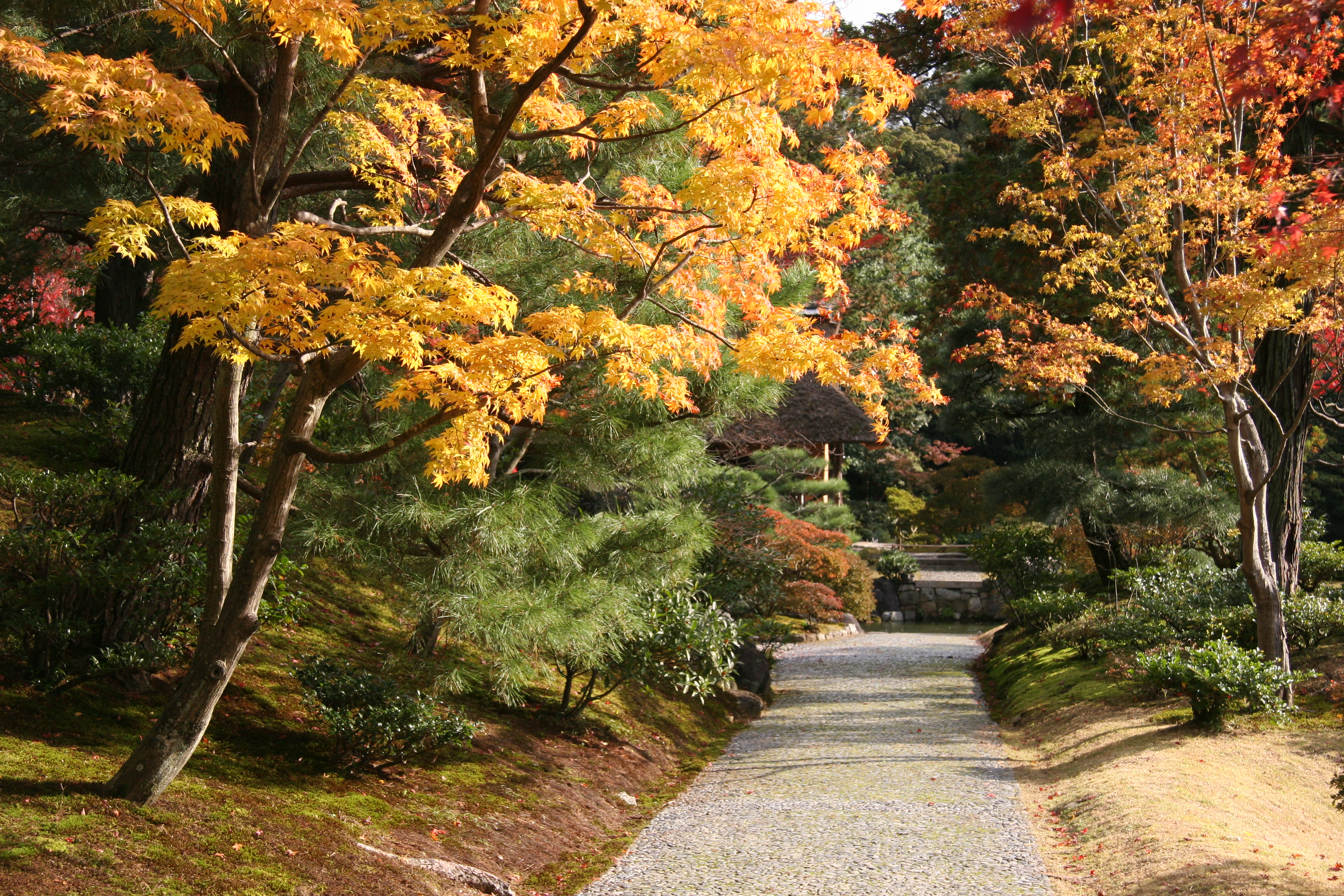
Garden path

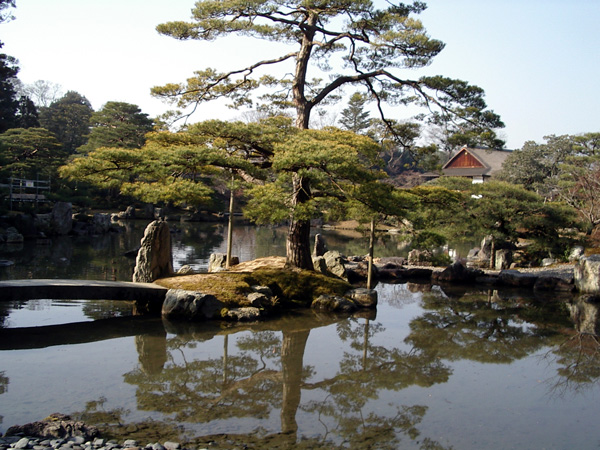
Garden of Katsura Imperial Villa

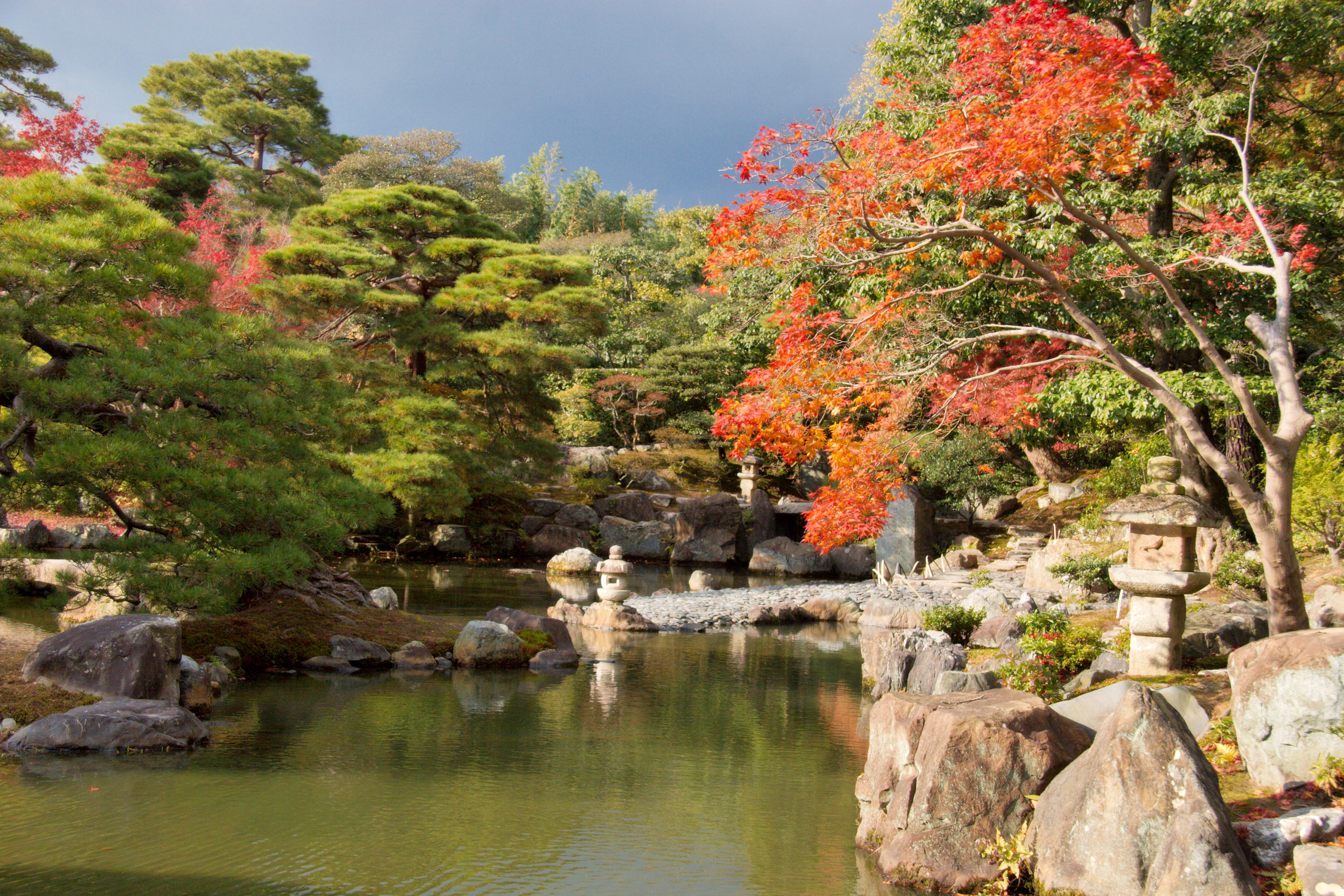
Pond

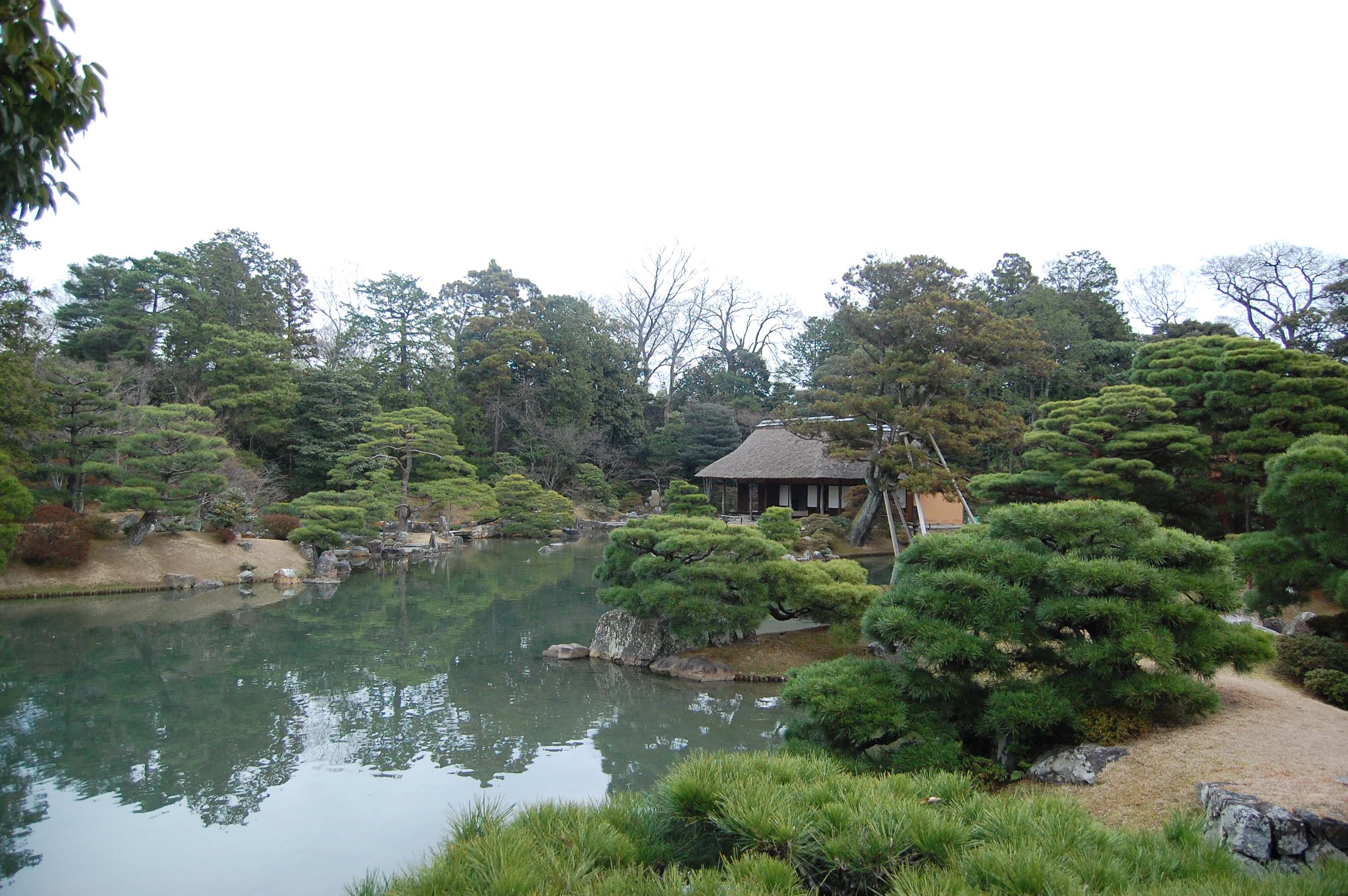
View of the Shōkin-tei from the Geppa-rō Pavilion

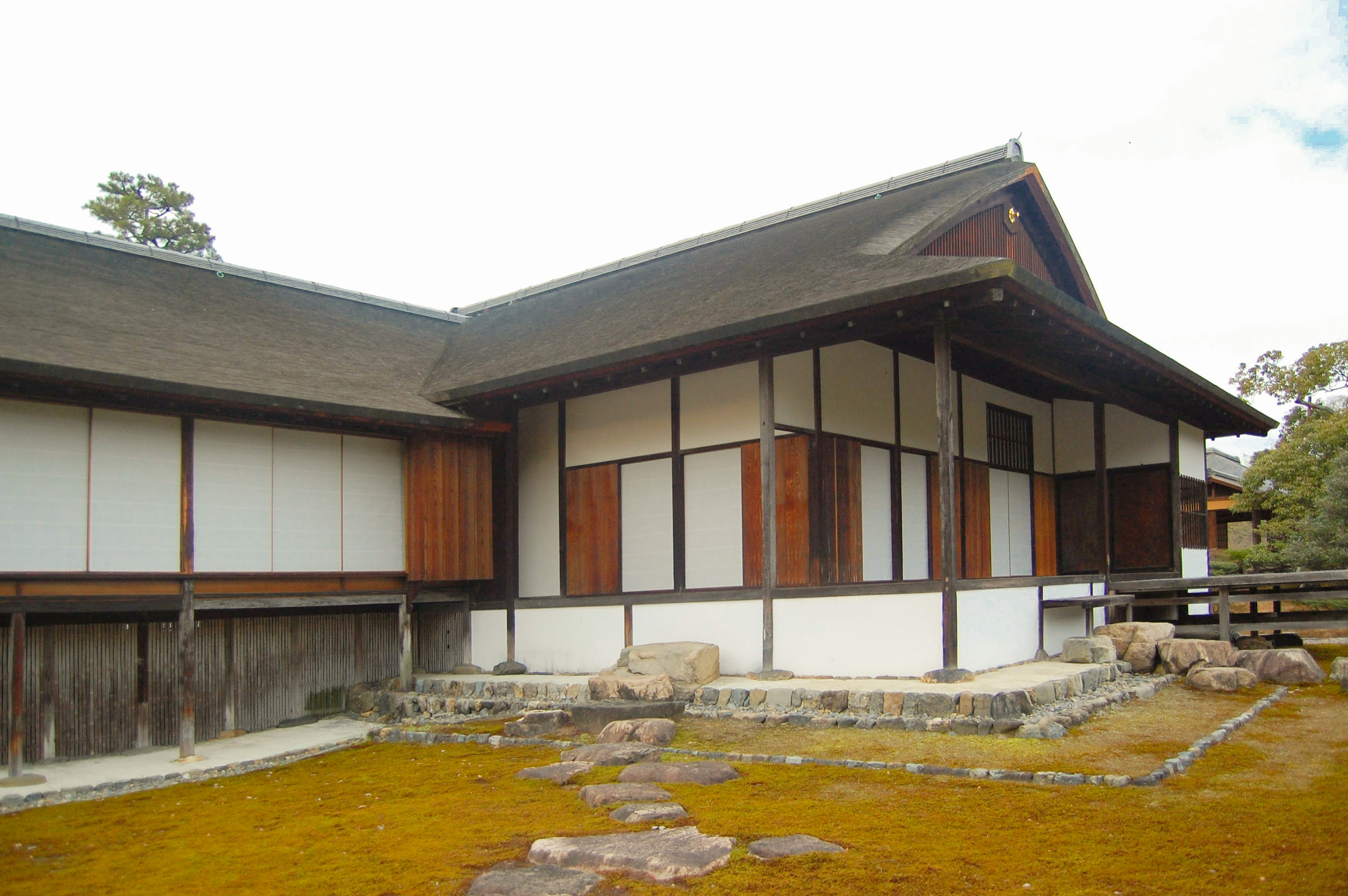
Main houses (shoin)

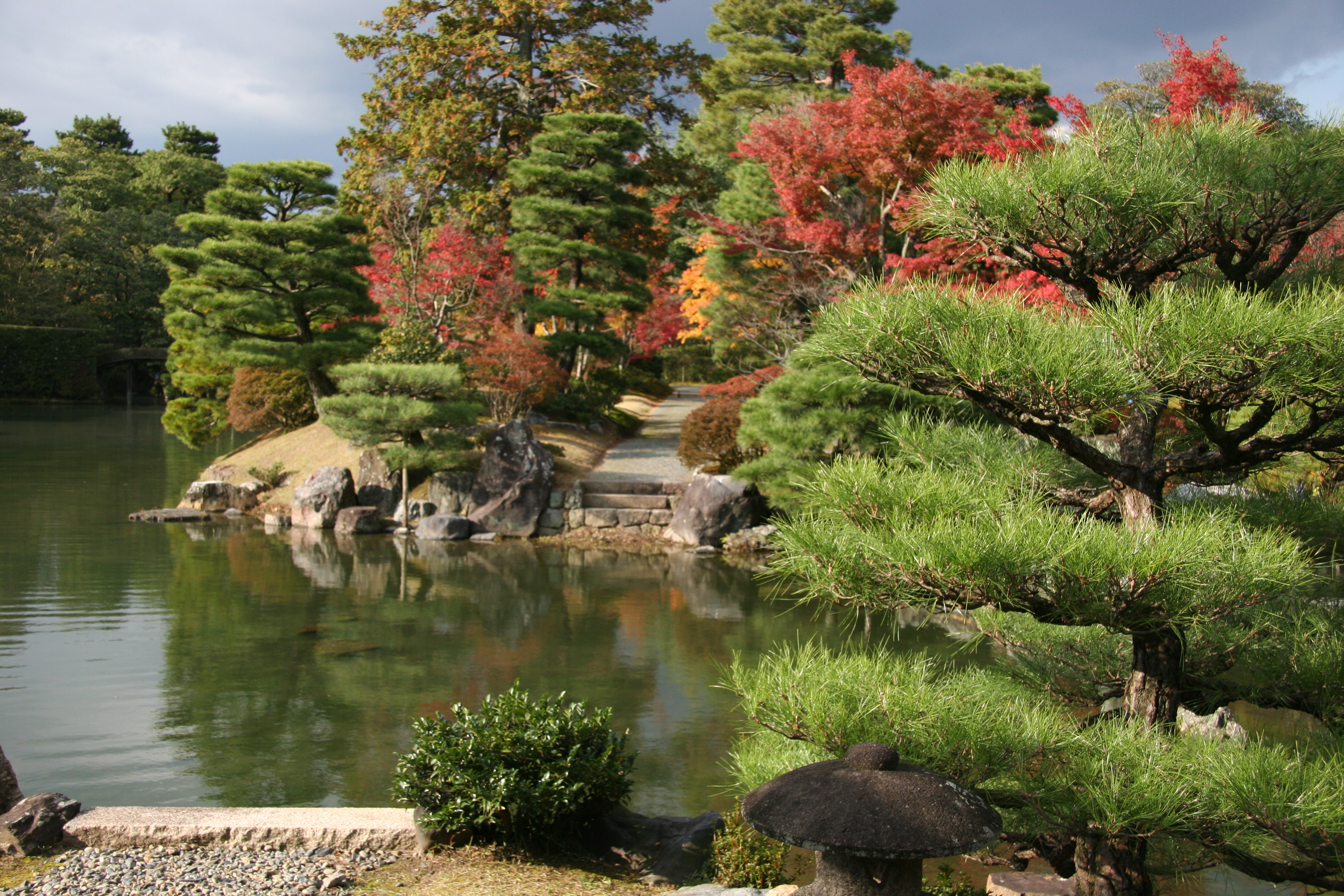
Garden

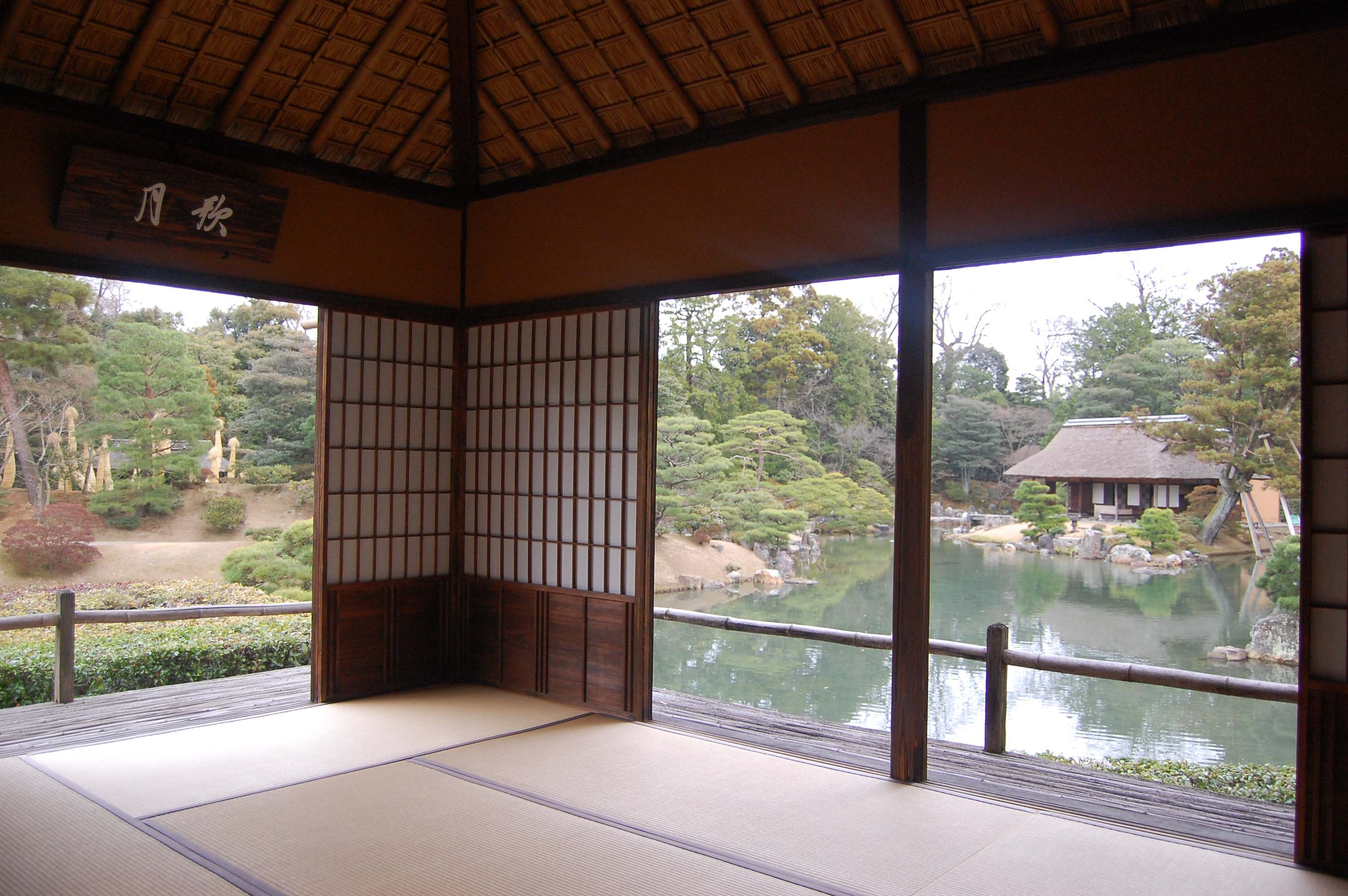
View of the pond from the Geppa-rō Pavilion

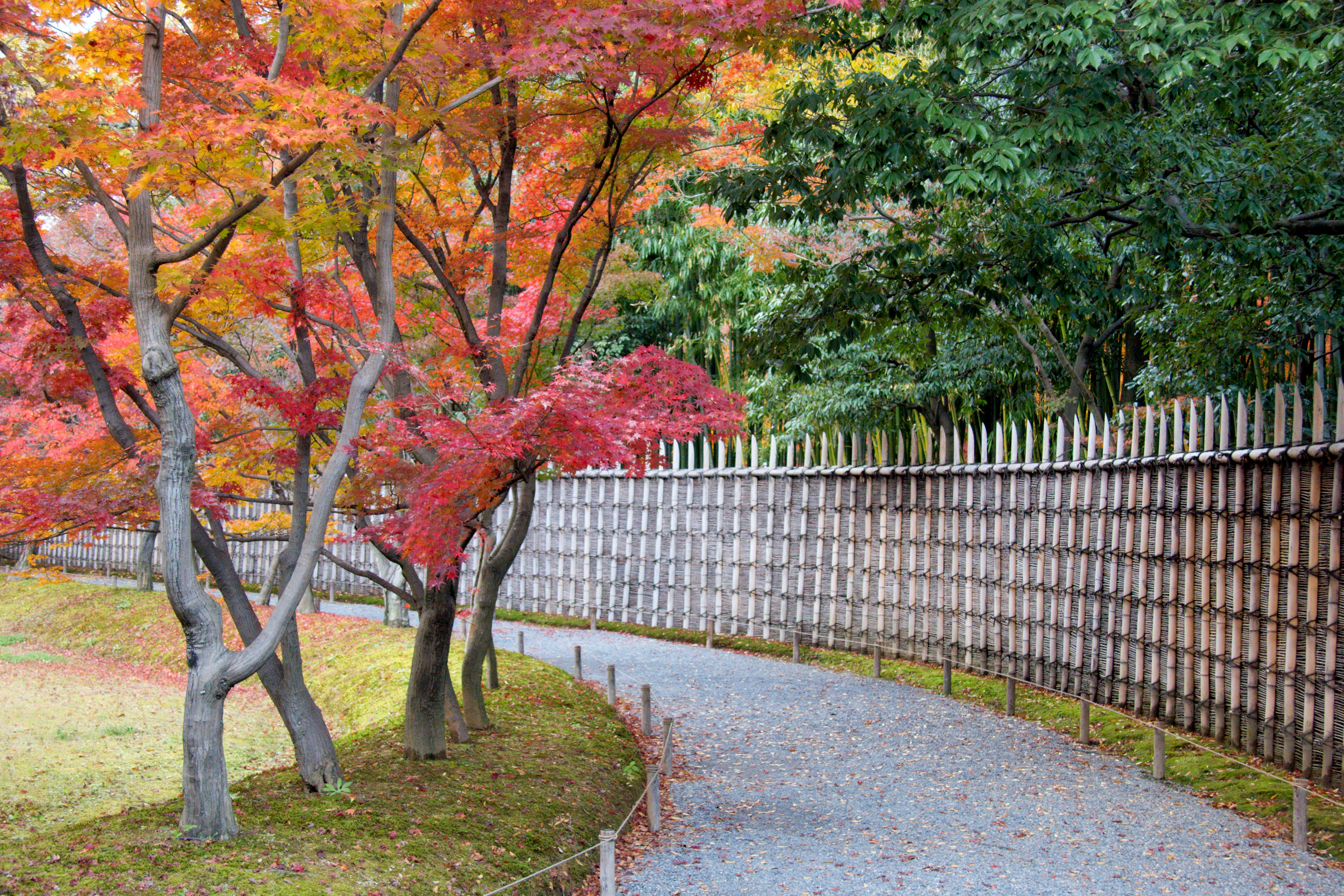
Exterior wall made of bamboo

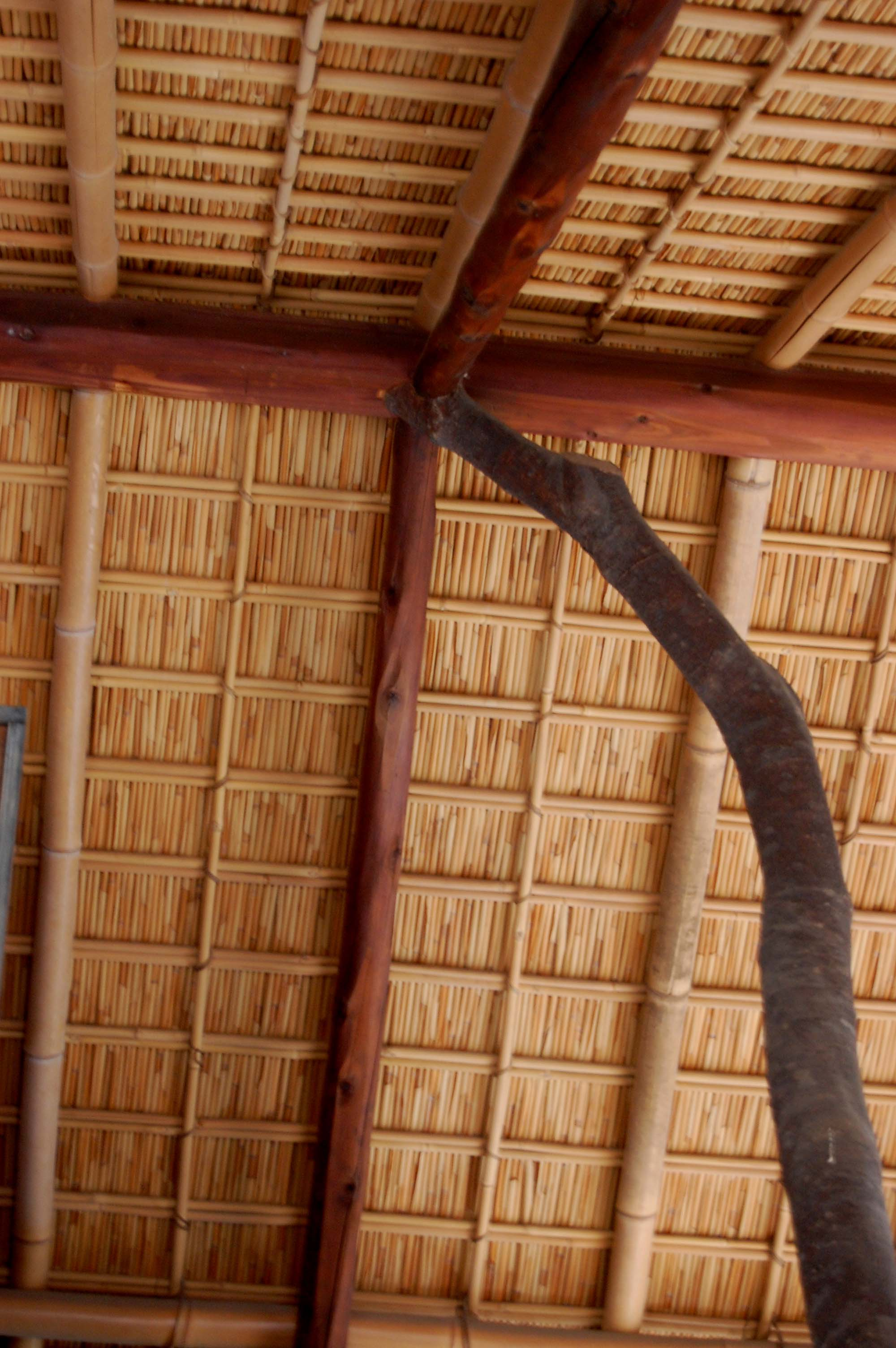
Asymmetrical column of support at the Geppa-rō Pavilion

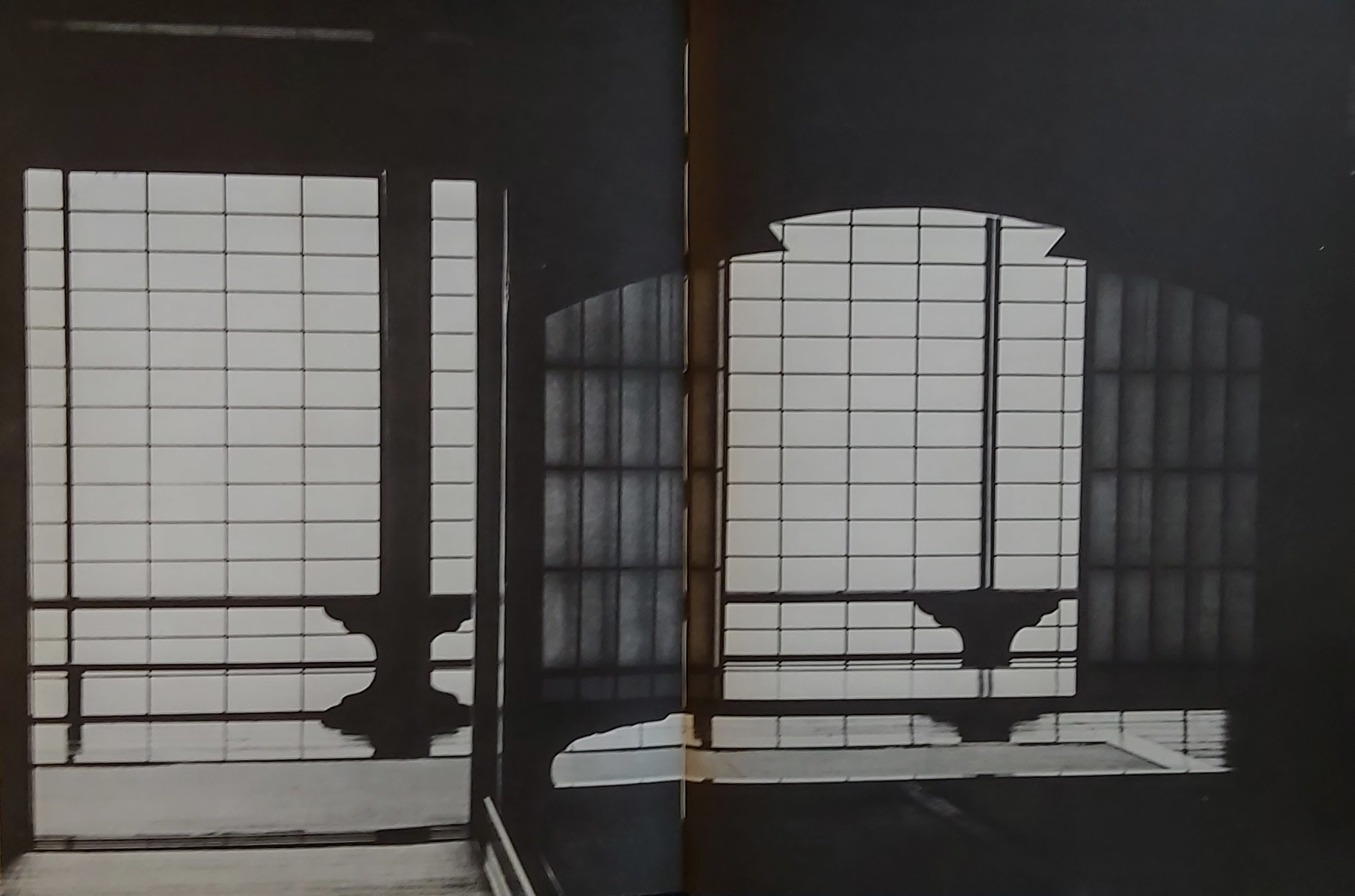
Interior of the New Palace, Katsura, showing the emperor's writing desk

== See also ==
- Ma (negative space)
- Japanese Art
- Katsura-no-miya

== Bibliography ==
There are numerous works on Katsura; the following are the main ones recommended as sources for further information:

- Walter Gropius, Kenzo Tange, Yasuhiro Ishimoto (photographs), Katsura: Tradition and Creation in Japanese Architecture (Yale University Press, New Haven, Zokeisha Publications, Tokyo, 1960) is a good (although early) work.
- Teiji Itoh, Takeji Iwamiya, Imperial Gardens of Japan (Weatherill, New York, 1970) covers the gardens in great detail
- Scott, Ted, "Imperial Gardens of Japan" (Amazon.com, 2008) describes and illustrates four imperial gardens in Kyoto.
- Teiji Itoh, Tadashi Yokoyama, Eiji Musha, Makato Suzuki, and Masao Arai and Taisuke Ogawa (photographs), Katsura: A Quintessential Representative of the Sukiya Style of Architecture ( Shinkenchiku-Sha, Tokyo, 1983) gives much internal detail, learned during the refurbishment of 1976-1982.
- Akira Naito, Takeshi Nishikawa (photographs), (translated Charles S. Terry), Katsura: A Princely Retreat (Kodansha, New York, 1977) is a magnificent book, the definitive work on Katsura in English.
- Ponciroli, Virginia (2011). Katsura Imperial Villa (Paperback). New York: Phaidon Press. ISBN 978-0-7148-6254-5.. Contains articles by Walter Gropius, Bruno Taut and Kenzo Tange on the impact of the villa.
