= Battle of Kashii =

1615 battle

- Part of the Siege of Osaka
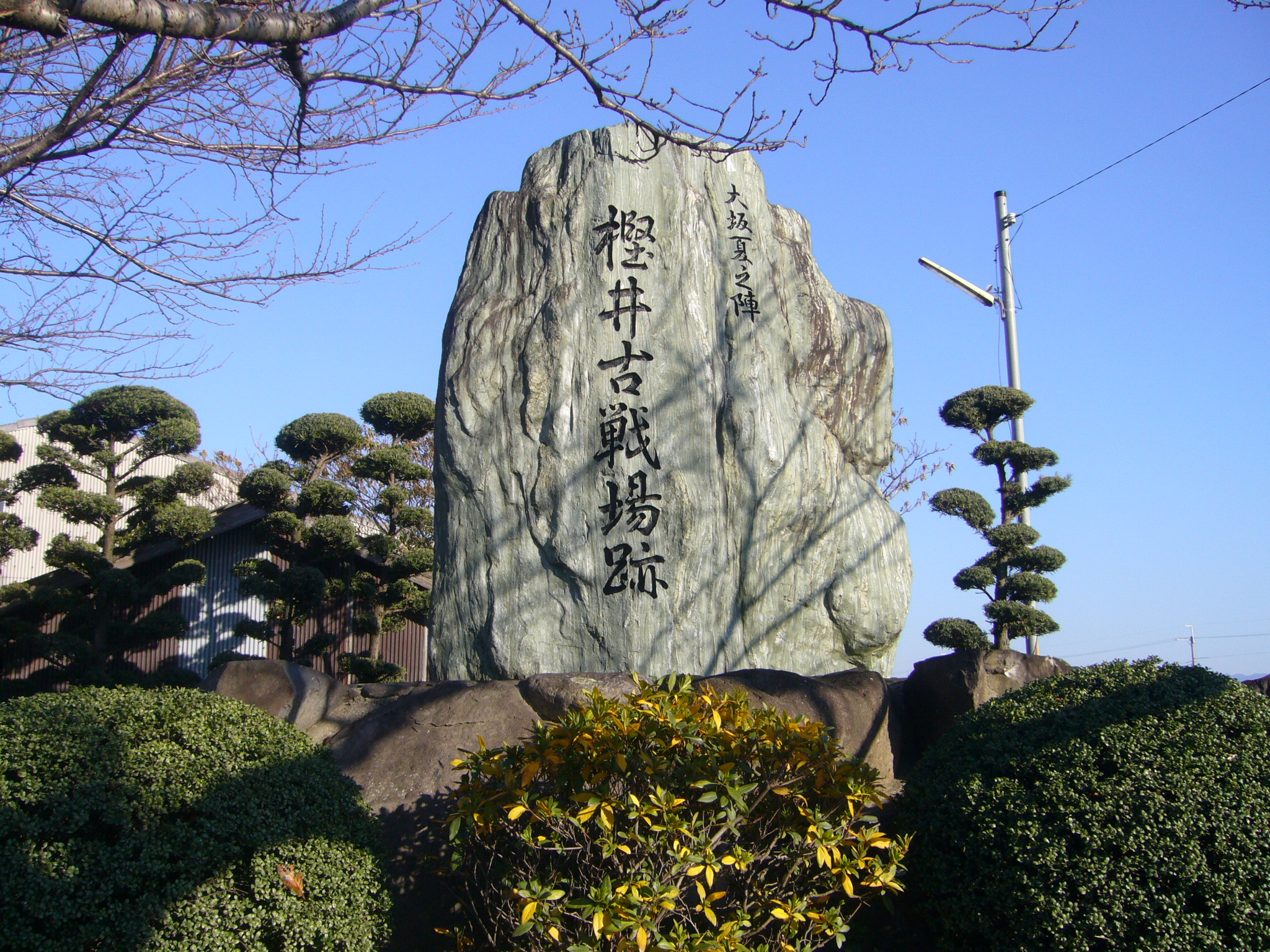
- At the remains of Kashii battlefield in Sennan, Osaka prefecture, Japan.
Date	May 26, 1615
Location	Kashii, near Wakayama Castle, Kii Province, Japan
Result	Tokugawa victory

Belligerents
Tokugawa shogunate	Toyotomi clan

Commanders and leaders
Asano Nagaakira	Ōno Harunaga; Ban Naoyuki †; Okabe Noritsuna

Strength
5,000	3,000

The Battle of Kashii (樫井の戦い) was the first battle of the Summer Campaign of the Siege of Osaka, fought in Japan in 1615, near the beginning of the Edo period. It took place on the 26th day of the 4th month of the Keichō era.

As the Shōgun's Eastern Army prepared to renew the siege begun the previous winter, the Ōsaka garrison sallied and ambushed Tokugawa forces in a number of skirmishes and sieges. In the battle of Kashii, a contingent of forces loyal to Toyotomi Hideyori, lord of Ōsaka, attempted to besiege Wakayama Castle, which was controlled by Asano Nagaakira, an ally of the shōgun. The attackers were led by Ōno Harunaga, Ban Naoyuki, and Okabe Noritsuna.

Tachibana Muneshige, who served as military advisor of the second shogun, Tokugawa Hidetada, had correctly predicted the movements of Toyotomi's general Ono Harufusa's troops, and guided Hidetada's troops.

Asano's garrison realized that their attackers were far from support or reinforcements, and met them in battle at Kashii, near Wakayama. Okabe and Ban were killed in the battle, and Ōno was consequently forced to retreat to Ōsaka.
