= Wakayama Castle =

Castle in Wakayama, Wakayama Prefecture, Japan

- 和歌山城
- Wakayama, Wakayama-ken, Japan
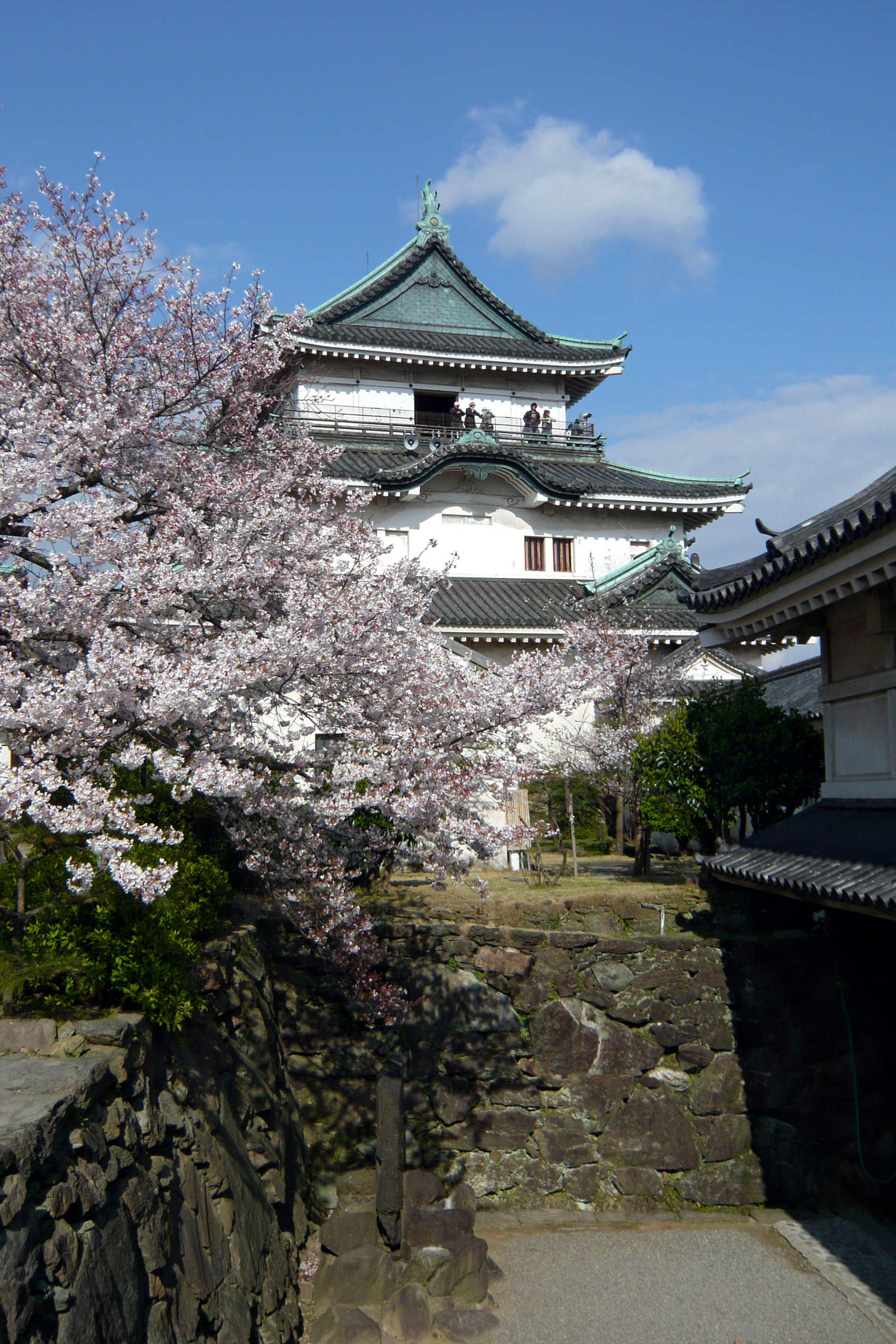
- The reconstructed concrete tenshu (keep) of Wakayama Castle

Site information
- Type: Hirayamashiro (hilltop castle)
- Condition: The tenshu and some connected buildings were reconstructed using concrete in 1958.

Location
- Wakayama Castle Wakayama Castle (Japan)
- Coordinates: 34°13′39.46″N 135°10′17.84″E
- Height: Three stories

Site history
- Built: 1585-1586
- Built by: Toyotomi Hidenaga
- In use: 1586 to 1945
- Materials: Earth, stone, and wood
- Demolished: Most of the castle during the Meiji Restoration, though the tenshu survived until its destruction from firebombing in 1945.

Layout of the tenshu

Wakayama Castle (和歌山城, Wakayama-jō) is a Japanese castle located in the city Wakayama, Wakayama Prefecture, Japan. For most of the Edo Period, it was the administrative center of Kishū Domain, which was controlled by a cadet branch of the Tokugawa clan. Due to its size and status, Wakayama Castle was ranked as one of the most important castles under the Tokugawa shogunate.

Although the castle was designated a National Historic Site in 1931, the original Tenshu and buildings were all destroyed by US bombing campaigns during the Pacific War. The current structures were rebuilt in concrete in 1958. The Nishi-no-Maru Garden was designated a National Place of Scenic Beauty in 1987.

== History ==
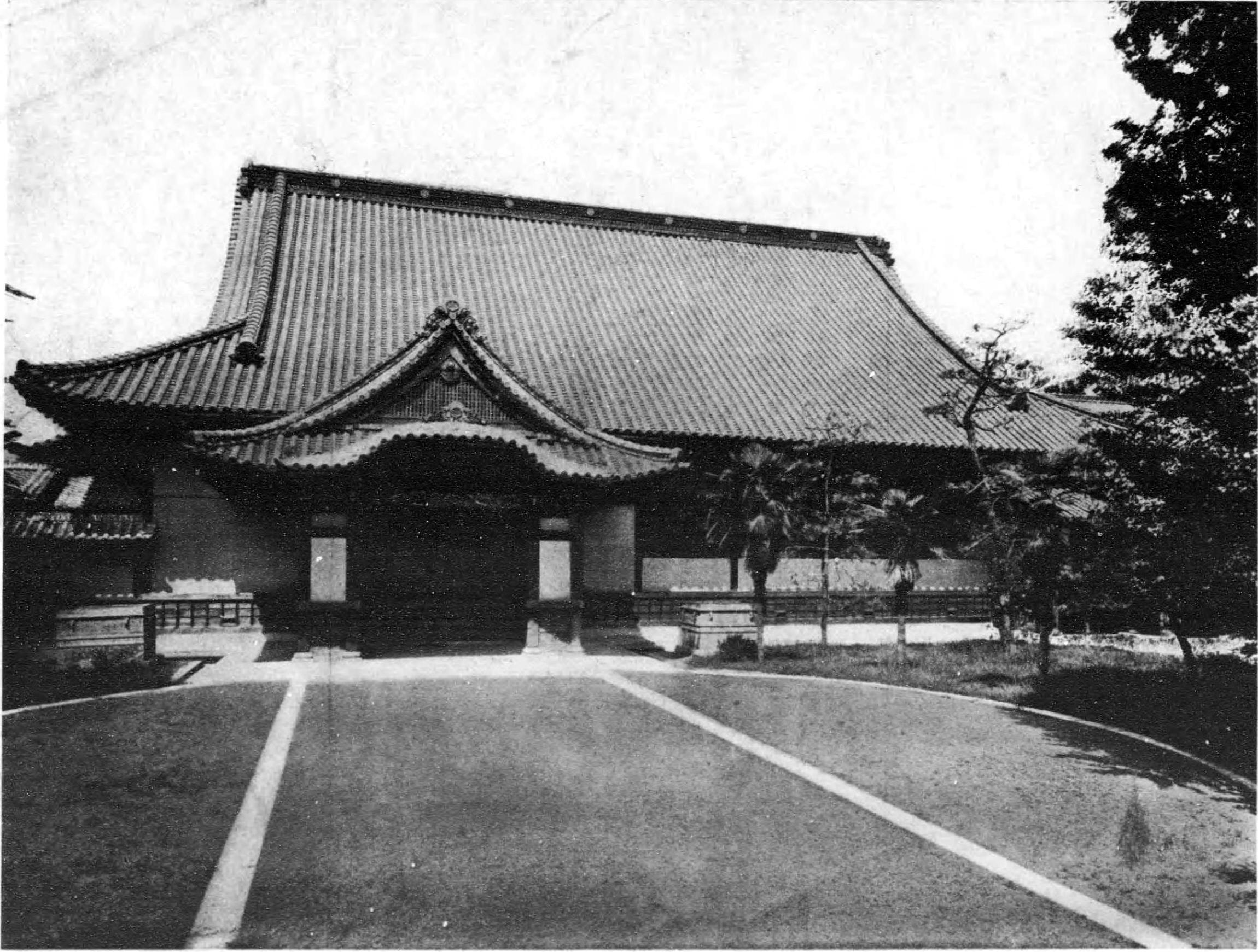
The Kishū Palace, later known as Tenrinkaku, was formerly from the Wakayama Castle's Ninomaru (photo Taishō 3, 1914)

During the Muromachi period, Kii Province was ruled by the Hatakeyama clan, which also controlled neighboring Kawachi and Izumi provinces; however, the political situation in Kii Province was complex, with large portions of the province under the effective control of armed monks under the control of Negoro-ji or followers of the Saiga Ikki, local followers of the Ikkō-ikki movement, who sought to overthrow the feudal system and establish a theocratic republic. The Saiga Ikki constructed Ōta Castle on a site near what later became Wakayama Castle as their headquarters. Oda Nobunaga, allied with the Negoro-shū invaded Kii Province in 1577 and attacked the Saiga Ikki, who had allied with his arch-enemy, Ishiyama Hongan-ji temple. Due to their strength with matchlock guns and guerrilla tactics, Nobunaga was unable to defeat the Saiga Ikki; however, the campaign was resumed by his successor, Toyotomi Hideyoshi. In 1584, Hideyoshi constructed Kishiwada Castle to defend Osaka, and the following year invaded Kii Province with a large army, annihilated Negoro-ji and laid siege to Ōta Castle. He ordered the building of dams on three sides of the castle, focusing the rainwaters and diverting the river to ruin the castle. As hunger set in, the samurai, monks, and peasants inside Ōta surrendered, and after a month fifty warrior monks led a final suicidal charge against Hideyoshi's army, after which the castle surrendered.

Hideyoshi awarded the province to his younger brother, Toyotomi Hidenaga, who was already ruler of Yamato Province. Hidenaga close to keep Wakayama as the seat of his power in Kii Province, as its location was convenient for trade and strategically close to the former strongholds of Negoro-ji and the Saiga Ikki, who still had many sympathizers in the area. With the assistance of Tōdō Takatora, who was noted for castle architecture, he began rebuilding a small fortification on Torafusayama hill which had been a relic of Hatakeyama rule, with low stone walls aligned with the natural terrain, and the central bailey located next to the current central bailey area. Hidenaga appointed Kuwayama Shigeharu as castellan, and remained at Kōriyama Castle in Yamato. Following the Battle of Sekigahara, Tokugawa Ieyasu reassigned the province in 1600 to Asano Yoshinaga.

Asano greatly expanded Wakayama Castle, constructing a three-story tenshu connected to three corner yagura by corridors. This tenshu had the same shape as the current tenshu, but was black instead of white. The overall dimensions of the castle were expanded to the northeast and the daimyō residence was relocated to this new enclosure, which was further protected by a double series of moats, utilizing the nearby Kinokawa River. In 1615 the castle was attacked by forces loyal to Toyotomi Hideyori, who were trying to end the siege of Osaka. Ono Harunaga, Hanawa Naoyuki and Okabe Noritsuna led 3000 men from Osaka against the castle which was held by Asano Nagaakira with 5000 men, In the Battle of Kashii Hanawa and Okabe were killed, and Ono was forced to flee back to Osaka. After the final defeat of the Toyotomi clan, the Asano clan was transferred to Hiroshima Domain, which had been confiscated from Fukushima Masanori in 1619.

The Asano were replaced as daimyō of Kishū Domain by Tokugawa Yorinobu, the tenth son of Tokugawa Ieyasu, and the founder of the Kii Tokugawa clan, who were given a special status as one of the cadet branches of the clan authorized to provide a successor to the office of Shogun should the main line fail to produce an heir. Due to its strategic location, Kishū Domain was also expected to watch over the Kansai region and areas further west for rebellion, and to hold the area until reinforcements could arrive from Edo. Tokugawa Yorinobu was a noted military commander who had distinguished himself at the Siege of Osaka. He rescued many ronin in the aftermath of the battle by hiring them for the domain and further expanded Wakayama Castle with a new northwest enclosure, and greatly strengthening its walls. He also had plans to expand the castle to the south; however, was forced to curtail these plans as rumors began to circulate that he was planning a rebellion. The issue was caused by the 1651 Keian Uprising in which the military strategist Yui Shōsetsu attempted to overthrow the Tokugawa shogunate and used Yorinobu's name without permission. Although cleared of suspicion of complicity, Yorinobu cancelled plans for further expansion of the castle.

Kishū Domain eventually did provide two shogun.Tokugawa Yoshimune (1684-1751) significantly reformed the domain's financial situation, and applied many of these reforms as eighth shogun from 1716. Tokugawa Iemochi (1846-1866) became shogun during the tumultuous Bakumatsu period, but ultimately failed to prevent the collapse of Tokugawa rule.

In 1791 the US captains John Kendrick of the Lady Washington and William Douglas of the Grace visited Kushimoto, hoping to open a trading relationship with Japan. News was sent to Wakayama Castle, which sent troops. However, Kendrick and Douglas departed two days before the troops arrived. The result of this first visit of Americans to Japan was largely symbolic for the United States. For Japan it resulted in a new system of alarms and coastal patrols, increasing Japan's isolation under sakoku.

In 1846, most of the castle was destroyed in a fire caused by lightning, but due to its special status, reconstruction of buildings including the tenshu was exceptionally permitted, and completed in 1850. However, only a couple of decades later, following the Meiji restoration, the Meiji government ordered the destruction of castles around the country. Many of the buildings of Wakayama Castle were pulled down and the daimyō palace was dismantled and moved to the grounds of Osaka Castle, where it became known as Kishū Palace and later Tenrinkaku.

In 1901, the Honmaru and Ninomaru areas were opened to the public as Wakayama Park, and in 1931 it was designated as a National Historic Site. The castle tower and all of the other Honmaru buildings were destroyed by the bombing of Wakayama by the US military during World War II. and the current tenshu was rebuilt in 1958 out of concrete and is open to the public as a symbol of the city and museum.

Two original gates remain, one of which, the Okaguchi Gate, was designed a National Important Cultural Property in 1957.

== Gallery ==
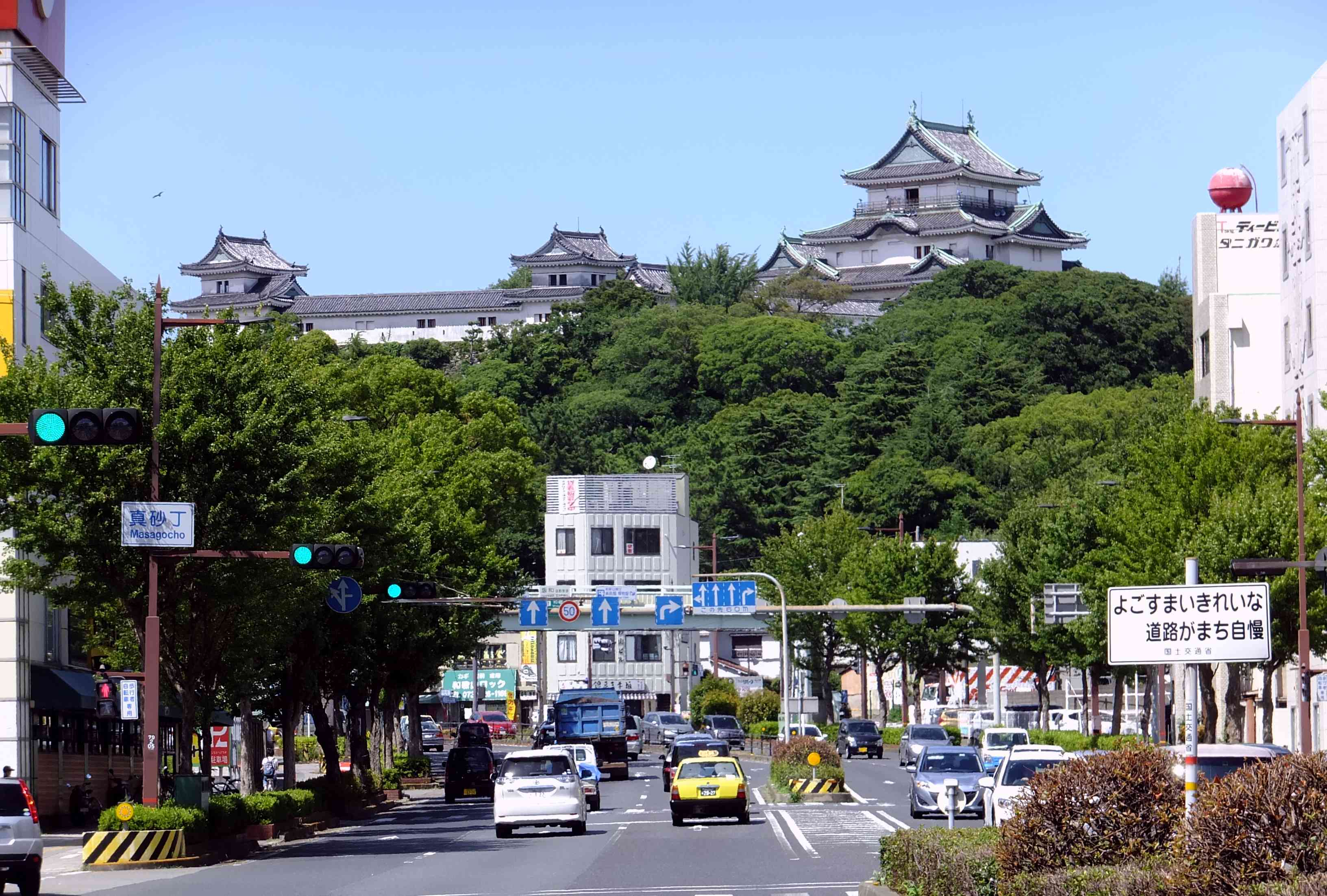
Wakayama Castle from the castle town

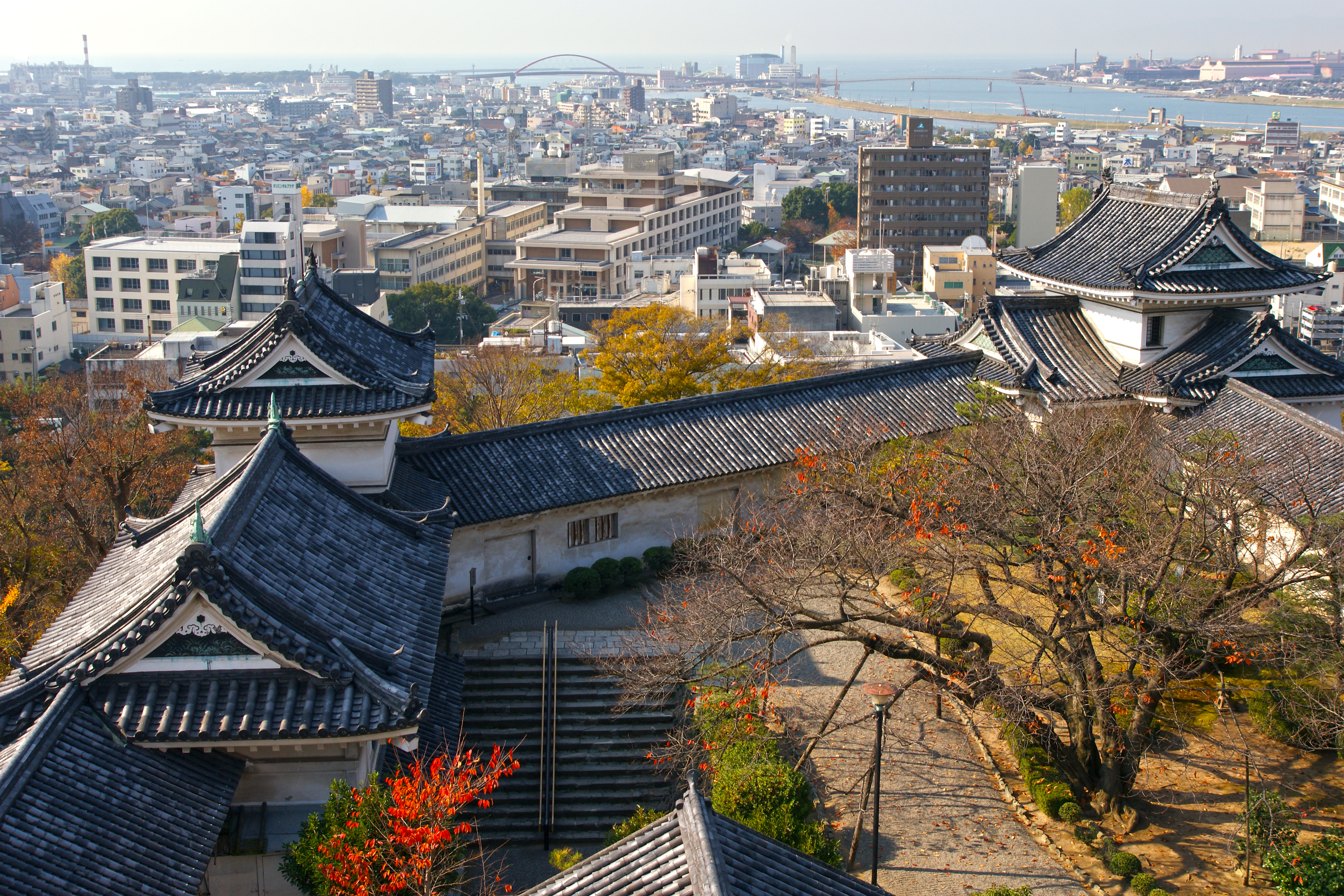
View from keep

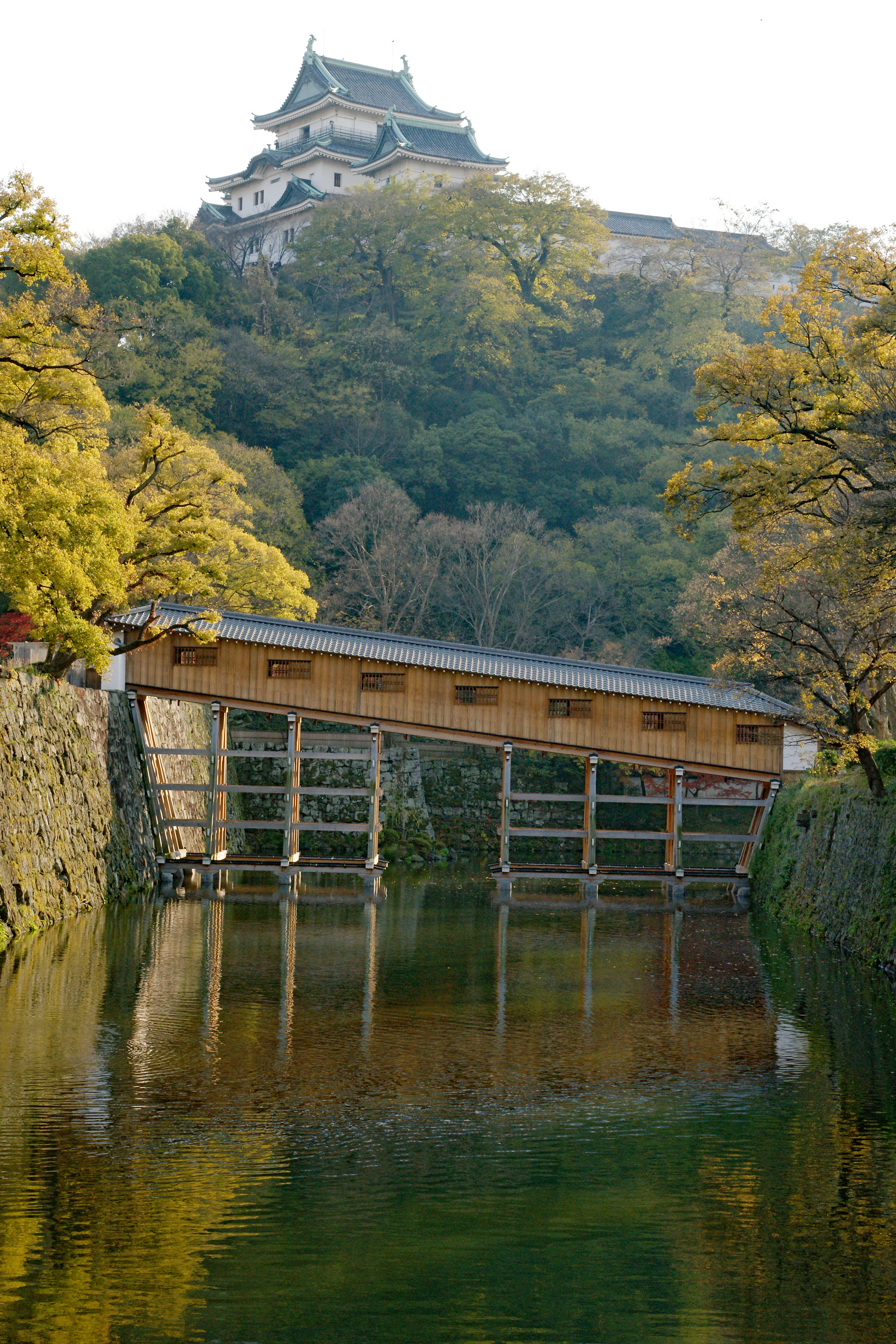
O-hashi-rōka bridge and tenshu

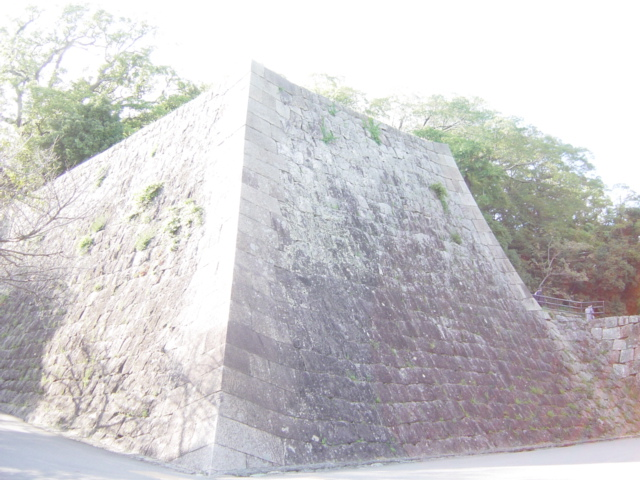
Foundations of the Matsunomaru yagura

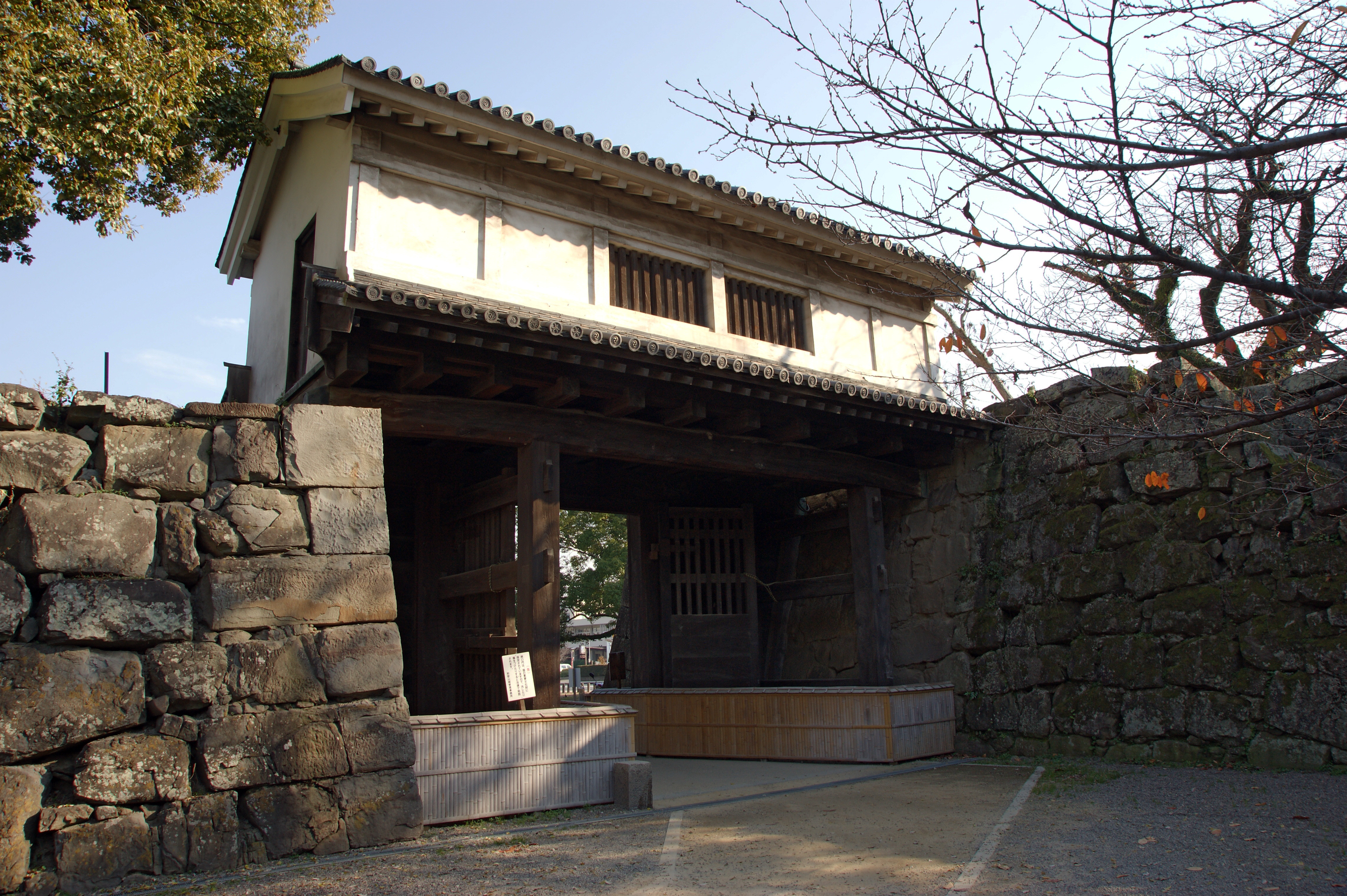
Okaguchi Gate (ICP)

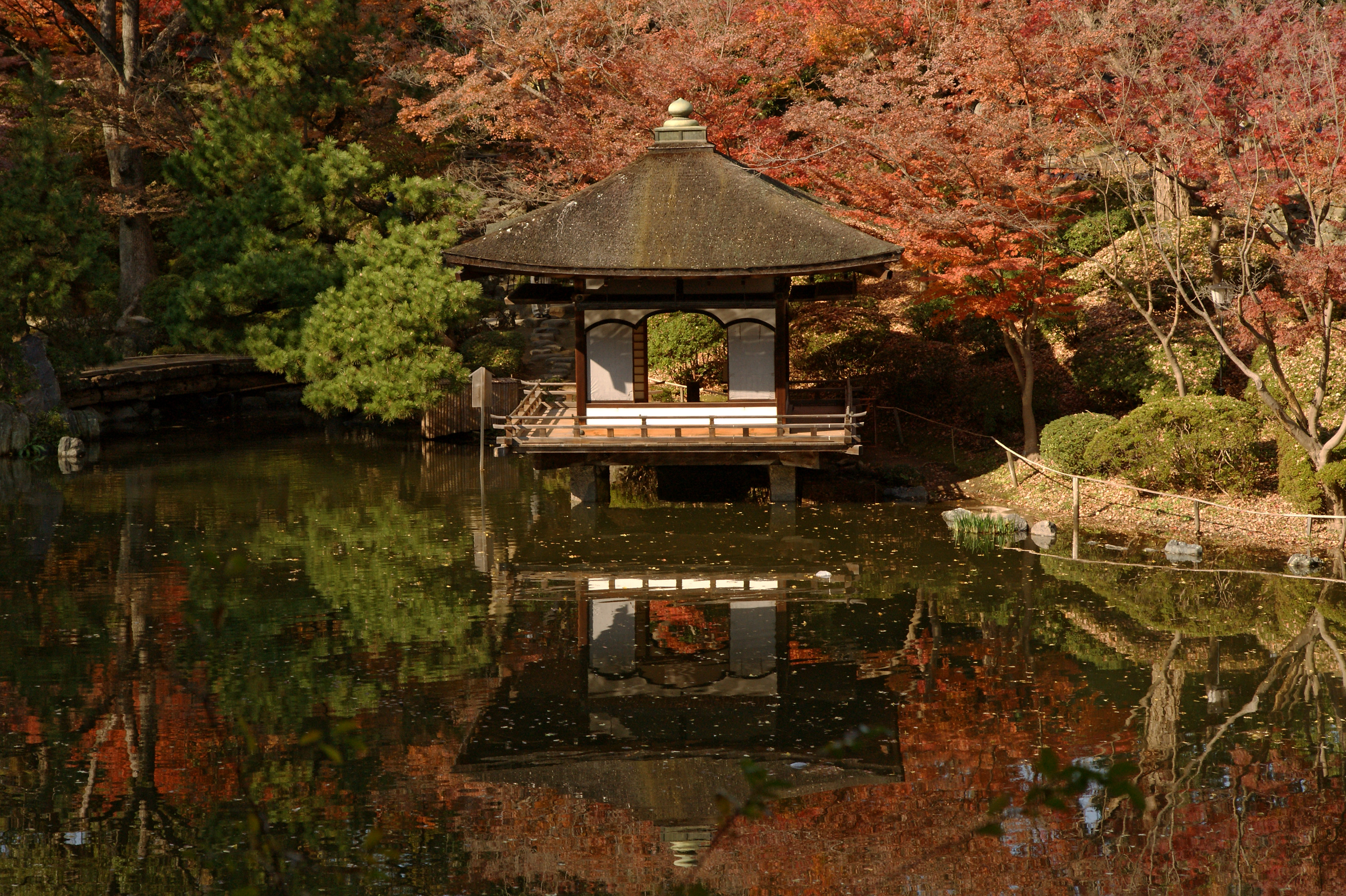
Nishi-no-Maru Gardens

== See also ==
- List of Historic Sites of Japan (Wakayama)
- List of Places of Scenic Beauty of Japan (Wakayama)

== Literature ==
- Benesch, Oleg and Ran Zwigenberg (2019). Japan's Castles: Citadels of Modernity in War and Peace. Cambridge: Cambridge University Press. p. 374. ISBN 9781108481946.
- De Lange, William (2021). An Encyclopedia of Japanese Castles. Groningen: Toyo Press. pp. 600 pages. ISBN 978-9492722300.
- Schmorleitz, Morton S. (1974). Castles in Japan. Tokyo: Charles E. Tuttle Co. ISBN 0-8048-1102-4.
- Motoo, Hinago (1986). Japanese Castles. Tokyo: Kodansha. p. 200 pages. ISBN 0-87011-766-1.
