= Ishide Tatewaki =

Ishide Tatewaki (石出帯刀) was the hereditary name adopted by the head of each generation of roya bugyo (prison magistrate) in Edo period Japan. The name "Ishide Tatewaki" was initially taken by a man named Honda Tsunemasa (本多常政), who lived in a village called Ishide. Though the first Ishide Tatewaki served Tokugawa Ieyasu in a military capacity and was present at the Osaka Campaign, he was assigned to be prison magistrate because of the overabundance of brigands in the Kanto region, and before long, the job became hereditary.

The Ishide family continued its duty as prison magistrates until the collapse of the Tokugawa shogunate and the start of the Meiji era.
