= Lady Acha =

Japanese noble woman from the Tokugawa clan

- 阿茶局
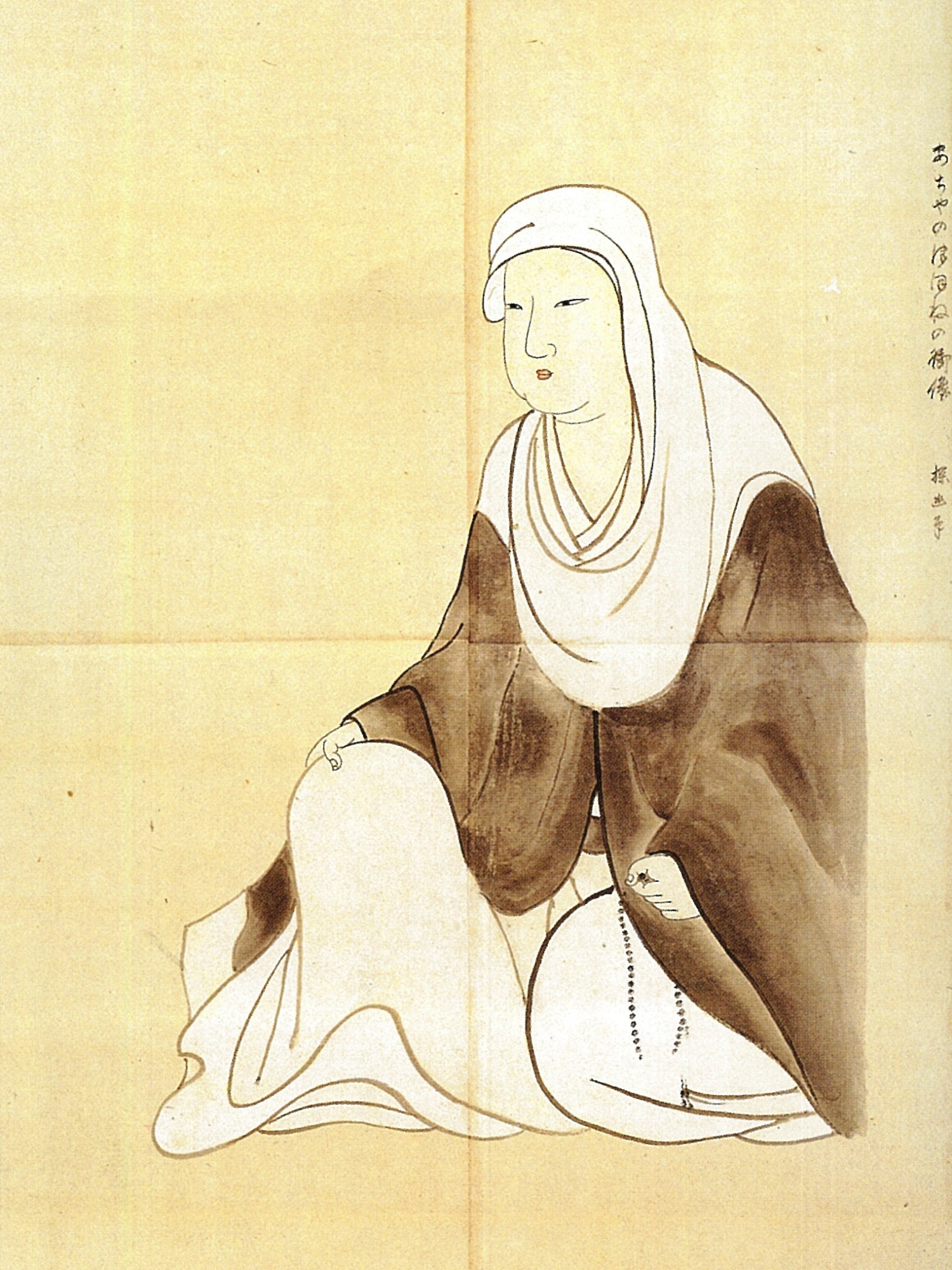
- Acha no Tsubone in nun's robe

Personal life
- Born: Suwa; March 16, 1555
- Died: February 16, 1637 (aged 81)
- Partner: Tokugawa Ieyasu
- Children: at least two sons
- Parent: Iida Naomasa

Religious life
- Religion: Buddhism
- Dharma names: Yegonvie (阿茶局); Unkō-in (雲光院)

Military service
- Allegiance: Takeda clan Tokugawa clan
- Battles/wars: Siege of Osaka

Lady Acha or Acha no Tsubone (阿茶局, March 16, 1555 - February 16, 1637) was a Japanese noble woman from the Sengoku period to the early Edo period. She was a concubine of Tokugawa Ieyasu, the founder of the Tokugawa shogunate. Due to her intelligence, Ieyasu entrusted her with management of the family's affairs, sending her to negotiate peace during the Siege of Osaka. Her contributions to the stabilization of the Tokugawa shogunate and service to the country were notable for the court; being inducted to the Junior First Rank of the Imperial Court the second highest honor that could be conferred by the Emperor of Japan.

== Early life ==
Lady Acha's first name was Suwa. Her pseudonym was Acha no Tsubone, Minbukyo, Yegonvie, Unko-in, Kamio Ichii and Ichii no ama (first nun). Suwa was born in 1555 as daughter of Iida Naomasa who served the Takeda clan. Then she became a wife of Kamio Tadashige, a retainer of the Imagawa clan. During the marriage she had two sons, after the death of her husband, she was called by Ieyasu.

In May 1579, Ieyasu invited Suwa to a meeting at Hamamatsu Castle. He offered to have her join the Tokugawa family as his concubine. Suwa accepted and became a member of the Tokugawa clan, Ieyasu gave Suwa the name ''Acha no Tsubone''. She controlled the housekeeping of the Tokugawas.

== In the Tokugawa clan ==
Under the influence of Oda Nobunaga, the ''First great unifier of Japan'', the Tokugawa clan participated in several conflicts against the Takeda clan until the last resistance of Takeda Katsuyori in the Battle of Tenmokuzan.

Due to her ties to the Takeda clan, Lady Acha used her influence in the Tokugawa clan to employ former servants of Takeda. According to "Kanei shoka keizuden" and "Kansei-fu", Tsuchiya Tadanao, leader of the Tsuchiya clan, was raised by Lady Acha after he and his mother escaped to Kiyonji Temple in Suruga Province after the fall of the Takeda clan. She introduced Tadanao to Ieyasu, so he was employed and later became a page of Tokugawa Hidetada, second shogun of the Tokugawa lineage. In 1583 Lady Acha's two sons were employed as officers at a salary of 3,000 koku.

Eventually, Lady Acha became more important as a retainer than as a concubine. She served Tokugawa Ieyasu in several of his military campaigns. In 1584, after Oda Nobunaga's death, the Tokugawa Army and Oda Nobukatsu's combined forces clashed with Hashiba Hideyoshi (the future Toyotomi Hideyoshi), who was the Battle of Komaki and Nagakute. At that time, Lady Acha accompanied the army and went to the battlefield. She was pregnant, and due to the tensions in battle she miscarried after the war and she never had a child with Ieyasu. Shortly thereafter, Ieyasu allies with Hideyoshi in his campaign to unify Japan.

In 1589, after the death of Lady Saigo, Acha become adopted mother of Tokugawa Hidetada and Matsudaira Tadayoshi. Since then, Lady Acha has repeatedly acted as a messenger in various positions. She was chosen by Ieyasu to employ new talents to serve the Tokugawa clan. She responded to Ieyasu's confidence in political aspects by becoming chief secretary.

== Sekigahara Campaign ==
After the death of Toyotomi Hideyoshi, the power of the Toyotomi clan declined and Japan would go to war again. Ieyasu had been chosen by Hideyoshi as member of the Council of Five Elders to act as regent for his son (Toyotomi Hideyori) with Yodo-dono (Oichi's daughter and Oda Nobunaga niece). Due to accusations that Ieyasu wanted to usurp Hideyori's throne, Ieyasu came into conflict with Ishida Mitsunari and others loyal to the Toyotomi clan. In 1600, the Battle of Sekigahara officially began, commanded by Ishida Mitsunari in the western army against the eastern army of Tokugawa Ieyasu. Ieyasu defeated Mitsunari and gained great power and influence. Most of Mitsunari's allies had their land confiscated, further weakening Toyotomi's power.

In 1603, Senhime, daughter of Tokugawa Hidetada, married Toyotomi Hideyori and lived with him in Osaka Castle along with his mother, Yodo-dono, who was sister to Oeyo, mother of Senhime. This marriage was only of a political nature to fortify the alliance between the two most powerful samurai clans at the time. The political alliance formed by Senhime was not enough to stabilize the relations between the two clans. Toyotomi clan members often clashed with those who were loyal to the Tokugawa clan.

== Siege of Osaka ==
Lady Acha was employed to ease rifts between the clans. In 1613, she served as the Tokugawa representative to resolve escalating conflicts with the Toyotomi clan during the Great Bronze Bell Incident. Hideyori's mother, Yodo-dono, who acted as the de facto leader of the Toyotomi clan, stirred up intrigues with the Tokugawa. She refused several offers made by Ieyasu and expelled the pro-Tokugawa servants from Osaka Castle.

In 1614, once again Lady Acha accompanied Ieyasu and the entire Tokugawa army into battle with the Toyotomi. Ieyasu trusted her because of her wisdom. She served as an envoy for peace negotiations at the time of the Siege of Osaka. Lady Acha was accompanied by Honda Masazumi to meet Kyōgoku Tadataka, son of Ohatsu, younger sister of Yodo-dono. During the meeting, Lady Acha assured Ohatsu that Ieyasu had no ill will towards Hideyori and that he wished to forgive him, but Hidetada was stubborn about taking the castle. They ensured that Ieyasu would allow Hideyori to keep Osaka as his manor, but if he wanted to leave he would give another one with a higher income, plus all his captains and soldiers would have free transit at the exit or they could stay indoors if they wanted to, but he would need a few hostages as a sign of goodwill.

Ohatsu transmitted the terms to Yodo-dono who, terrified, asked Ōno Harunaga, Oda Nobukatsu and Hideyori's seven top advisers to accept the terms of the surrender. Lady Acha went to the enemy headquarters and held again a peace conference with Ohatsu and Okurakyo no Tsubone, maid of Yodo-dono. The conference was held by women only. She was told that the outer ditch should be filled by Ieyasu's men. The peace treaty was successfully carried out, but in 1615 once again the Toyotomi clan rebelled with the Tokugawa clan. As a result, Hideyori and Yodo-dono committed suicide in the flames of Osaka castle.

== Later ==
After Ieyasu's death, she moved to Edo, she gained a mansion and 300 koku. Since she served as Moriyaku (guardian) at the time when Tokugawa Kazuko (Empress consort of Japan at this time) entered into court, she was granted Juichii (Junior First Rank) by Emperor Gomizunoo. After the death of Hidetada, she entered into priesthood and called herself as Unkōin (雲光院). Died in 1637 at the age of 83, and buried in Unkōin (Miyoshi, Koto Ward, Tokyo).

== Honours ==
- Junior First Rank (Juichii)

== Bibliography ==
- Bryant, Anthony (1995). Sekigahara 1600: The Final Struggle For Power. Osprey Campaign Series. Vol. 40. Oxford: Osprey Publishing. ISBN 978-1-85532-395-7.
- Davis, Paul K. (2001). "Besieged: 100 Great Sieges from Jericho to Sarajevo." Oxford: Oxford University Press.
- 戦況図録大坂の陣―永き戦乱の世に終止符を打った日本史上最大規模の攻城戦(2004) 新人物往来社 ISBN 978-4-404-03056-6
- Sansom, George (1961). A History of Japan, 1334–1615. Stanford: Stanford University Press. ISBN 0-8047-0525-9.
