= Shigeno =

Shigeno may refer to:

- Shigeno Station, railway station of Shinano Railway Line in Tōmi City, Nagano Prefecture, Japan
- 12788 Shigeno, a main-belt asteroid
- Battle of Shigeno, fought in the final months of 1614, was one element in the siege of Osaka

== People with the surname ==
- Shuichi Shigeno (born 1958), Japanese manga author famous for the anime and manga Initial D
- Yasumasa Shigeno, Japanese politician and member of the House of Representatives for the Social Democratic Party
