= Asano Mitsuakira =

Japanese samurai

- 浅野 光晟
- Born: November 11, 1617
- Died: May 27, 1693 (aged 75)
- Spouse: Maeda Manhime
- Children: Asano Tsunaakira; Asano Naganao; Asano Nagateru; Ichihime; Kamehime; Hisahime
- Relatives: Asano Nagaakira (father); Tokugawa Furihime (mother)
- Military career
- Allegiance: Hiroshima Domain
- Service years: 1632–1672
- Rank: Daimyō

Asano Mitsuakira (September 11, 1617 – May 27, 1693) was a Japanese samurai of the early Edo period who served as daimyō of the Hiroshima Domain from 1632 to 1672. His childhood name was Ichimatsu (市松) and later become Iwamatsu (岩松).

== Family ==
- Father: Asano Nagaakira
- Mother: Tokugawa Furihime (1580–1617), third daughter of the shōgun Tokugawa Ieyasu
- Wife: Maeda Manhime (1618–1700), daughter of Maeda Toshitsune, 2nd Daimyo of Kaga Domain and Tokugawa Tamahime (daughter of the 2nd shōgun Tokugawa Hidetada and Asai Oeyo)
- Children:
  - Asano Tsunaakira (1637–1673) by Manhime
  - Asano Naganao (1644–1666) by Manhime
  - Asano Nagateru (1652–1702) by Manhime
  - Ichihime married Tozawa Masanobu of Shinjō Domain by Manhime
  - Kamehime married Sengoku Tadatoshi of Ueda Domain by Manhime
  - Hisahime married Ogasawara Tadakatsu of Kokura Domain by Manhime

Preceded by Asano Nagaakira	2nd Daimyō of Hiroshima; 1632–1672	Succeeded by Asano Tsunaakira
