= Ōkurakyō no Tsubone =

Japanese female servant of Toyotomi clan

Lady Okura-kyo Ōkurakyō no Tsubone
- 大蔵局
- The emblem (mon) of the Toyotomi clan

Personal life
- Born: 16th-century
- Died: 1615
- Cause of death: Suicide
- Spouse: Ono Satomori
- Children: Ōno Harunaga; Ōno Harufusa; Ōno Harutane; Ōno Haruzumi

Religious life
- Religion: Buddhism

Military service
- Allegiance: Toyotomi clan
- Battles/wars: Siege of Osaka

Lady Ōkurakyō or Ōkurakyō no Tsubone (大蔵局) was a Japanese noble woman and retainer of the Toyotomi clan during the Sengoku period. She was the wet nurse of Yodo-dono and later served her son Toyotomi Hideyori. She wielded great power within the Toyotomi family along with the Ono brothers, playing a crucial role before and during the siege of Osaka.

== Life ==
Lady Ōkurakyō was the wife of Ono Satomori who lived in Tango Province. During this marriage she gave birth to Ono Harunaga, Ono Harufusa, Ono Harutane, Ono Haruzumi. In her early career she served Yodo-dono (Toyotomi Hideyoshi's concubine and Oichi's daughter) as her wet nurse, and later she began to serve Hideyori (Yodo-dono's son).

After Toyotomi Hideyoshi, the Toyotomi clan leader, died, his first wife, Kodai-in left Osaka castle with Kozosu, Kodai-in's assistant. Later both women decided to support Tokugawa Ieyasu, rival of Yodo-dono and Hideyori. When Hideyoshi died, the clan's leadership was left in the hands of the Council of Five Elders, due to the fact that Hideyori was too young. Later, the Council of the Five Elders goes into crisis and crumbles, so Yodo-dono took substantial control over the clan's leadership. In 1599 following questioning by Tokugawa Ieyasu, Lady Okurakyo's son, Ono Harunaga was banished to Shimotsuke Province, under suspicion of being a ringleader of a failed plot to assassinate Tokugawa Ieyasu that had been hatched by servants of Tokugawa Ieyasu and Honda Masanobu.

== Sekigahara campaign ==
Two main factions arose during the fading years of Hideyoshi's rule and the immediate aftermath of his death. Tokugawa Ieyasu was unrivaled in terms of seniority, rank, reputation, and overall influence within the regency government, and had the allegiance of many of the lords of eastern Japan. Toyotomi clan loyalists and the lords of western Japan rallied behind Ishida Mitsunari. Tensions between them sometimes boiled into open hostilities, with relations eventually degenerating into the conflicts of 1600 that led to Sekigahara.

In 1600 the Sekigahara campaign began, a fight between those loyal to Tokugawa, the Eastern army led by Tokugawa Ieyasu, against those loyal to the Toyotomi clan, Western army led by Ishida Mitsunari. Lady Okurakyo son's Ono Harunaga was forced to join forces with the Eastern army at the Battle of Sekigahara, thereby earning a pardon for his crime from Ieyasu. Ishida Mitsunari was defeated by Ieyasu and the power of the Toyotomi clan diminished even further.

Following the battle, under orders from Ieyasu Ono Harunaga bore a note from Ieyasu to the Toyotomi clan, in which Ieyasu declared, 'I bear no animosity towards the Toyotomi clan' after which he remained in Osaka and did not return to Edo. When Lady Okurakyo's son returned to Osaka, she was already one of the most prominent political figures in the castle, giving her children the opportunity to also amass such influence in Toyotomi's domain.

Lady Okurakyo and Aeba no Tsubone was one of lady's maid in a high position. It seems that she and Lady Aeba was good at negotiations (with military families) and therefore, she was dispatched by Yodo-dono as her representative several times. Although Lady Aeba was not more prominent than Lady Okurakyo, Aeba no Tsubone was one of women who played an active part in the Osaka Castle.

== Siege of Osaka ==
In 1614, Ieyasu Tokugawa accused Hideyori of an intention to get rid of him on the ground that an inscription on a large bell, which Hideyori caused to be cast for the Hokoji Temple, contained the two ideographs representing the name of Ieyasu in such a way as to signify his downfall.

When the incident of Hoko-ji Temple bell occurred, Lady Okurakyo went to Sunpu to see Tokugawa Ieyasu. In this meeting, Ieyasu hatched a plot to induce a split among the people of the Toyotomi family. On one hand, Ieyasu proposed, humbly, a generous demand towards Lady Okurakyo. On the other hand, Ieyasu made severe demands on Katagiri Katsumoto, who represented the moderates and had been separately asking Ieyasu to save the Toyotomi family.

At this time, the three proposals proposed by Katsumoto

"Hideyori's attendance at Sunpu and Edo",

"Yodo-dono is held as a hostage",

"Hideyori leaves Osaka Castle and moves to another domain"

Naturally, the opinions of Lady Okurakyo and Katsumoto differed and didn't dovetail. Watchful people at Osaka Castle came to believe that Katsumoto was a spy of Tokugawa and eventually, Katsumoto was forced to leave Osaka Castle despite the persuasion by Yodo-dono. Other moderate busho who watched the scene also gave up on the future of the Toyotomi family and left Osaka Castle. Because of this the Ono family came to be in a position to lead the Toyotomi family.

In November 1614, Tokugawa Ieyasu decided not to let this force grow any larger, and led 164,000 men to Osaka. Afterwards, the pro-war faction within the Toyotomi family gained ascendancy and enlisted the services of ronin from various parts of the country to take part in the Winter campaign of the siege of Osaka, however; Ono clan orchestred with Yodo-dono and passively sued for peace, earning they the animosity of Sanada Yukimura's pro-war faction. In January 1615, Lady Okurakyo held a peace conference with Ohatsu (Yodo-dono's sister) and Lady Acha (Ieyasu's concubine) as representative of Toyotomi clan. The peace treaty was successfully carried out.

In 1615 once again the Toyotomi clan rebelled with the Tokugawa clan. During the summer campaign of the siege of Osaka, Harunaga sent Senhime (daughter of Tokugawa Hidetada and Hideyori's wife) as a messenger for Ono, to plead for clemency for Hideyori and Yodo-dono; without waiting for answers, Toyotomi Hideyori Yodo-dono, Lady Okurakyo, Lady Aeba and the four Ono brothers committed seppuku in the flames of Osaka castle, ending the Toyotomi legacy. The final major uprising against Tokugawa rule was put to an end, leaving the shogunate unchallenged for approximately 250 years.
