= Ban Naoyuki =

Japanese samurai

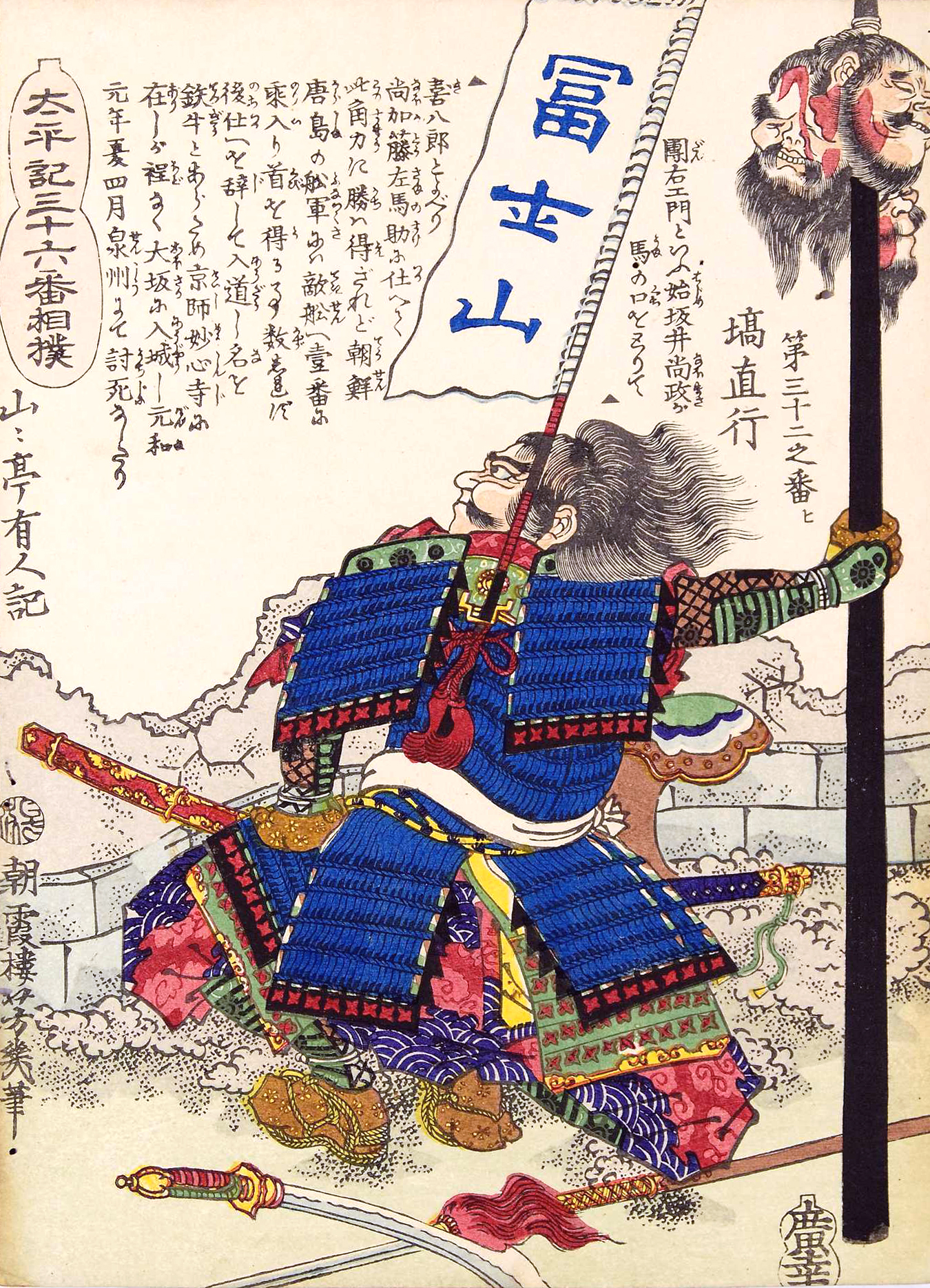
- Ban Naoyuki, painted by Ochiai Yoshiiku
- Born: 1567
- Died: May 26, 1615 (aged 47–48)
- Other name: Ban Dan'emon
- Spouse(s): Seishitsu: , Sokushitsu:
- Military career
- Era: Sengoku, Edo

Ban Dan'emon Naoyuki (塙 団右衛門 直之; 1567 – May 26, 1615) was a Japanese samurai general of the late Sengoku and early Edo periods. He first served as a retainer of Katō Yoshiaki, one of the "Seven Spears of Shizugatake", who went on to become lord of the Aizu domain, in Mutsu. Naoyuki served Lord Katō as a gunnery commander (teppō-taishō).

Naoyuki followed his lord during the invasion of Korea in the 1590s, and for his actions in combat there he was given a stipend of 350 koku. However, at the Battle of Sekigahara in 1600, he opposed Yoshiaki's orders and subsequently left his service. After that, he served several lords, including Kobayakawa Hideaki, Matsudaira Tadayoshi, and Fukushima Masanori; however, as his former lord Yoshiaki was a hindrance, Naoyuki entered the priesthood for a time.

He served the Toyotomi clan at the Osaka Winter Campaign in 1614. However, during the next year's Summer Campaign, he was killed in action fighting Asano Nagaakira's forces in Izumi province.
