= Nishio Munetsugu =

Japanese Samurai during the Edo period (????-1635)

Nishio Munetsugu 西尾宗次
- Born: Unknown
- Died: 1635
- Other names: Nizaemon
- Occupation: samurai lord

Nishio Munetsugu (西尾 宗次, died 1635) was a Japanese samurai lord during the Azuchi-Momoyama and early Edo period. He was a retainer of Matsudaira Tadanao, the lord of Fukui Domain in Echizen Province.

== Life ==
In his early life, Munetsugu was a vassal of the Takeda clan. He belonged to the Takeda army in the battle of Takatenjin Castle, and escaped from the castle with Yokota Yokomatsu during the fall of Takatenjin Castle in 1581.

In 1615, he belonged to the Echizen Matsudaira's firearm battalion during the Siege of Osaka, and defeated Sanada Yukimura, who was resting in the precincts of Yasui Shrine. Due to his achievements, Tokugawa Ieyasu and Tokugawa Hidetada gave him a reward, and Matsudaira Tadanao gave him a sword, and his domain was increased to 1,800 koku.

In the gunki monogatari Namba Senki that first appeared in Yukimura, Munetsugu did not know who he had beheaded at first, but because Hara Sadatane, who was a former friend of Yukimura, recognized this as Yukimura's head. Munetsugu had his head delivered to Ieyasu. Ieyasu scolded Munetsugu for the exaggerated report at that time, but because he had just given a reward for the head of Mishuku Masatomo, he reluctantly gave Munetsugu the same reward. In addition, in Matsudaira Bunko, passed down within the Echizen Matsudaira family, it is stated that Munetsugu fought with a spear and killed Yukimura without knowing that of his true identity.

In order to memorialize Yukimura, Nishio built a burial mound for the severed head in the precincts of Koken-ji Temple in present-day Asuwa, Fukui, Fukui Prefecture. A Kṣitigarbha statue, 90 cm in height and made of shakudani stone, was set at the spot. In 1975, it was donated to the Fukui City History Museum by the descendants of the Nishio family.

== In culture ==
Nishio Munetsugu makes an appearance in Yami no naka no koe by Shōtarō Ikenami.
