= Battle of Shigino =

1614 battle in Japan

- Part of the Siege of Osaka
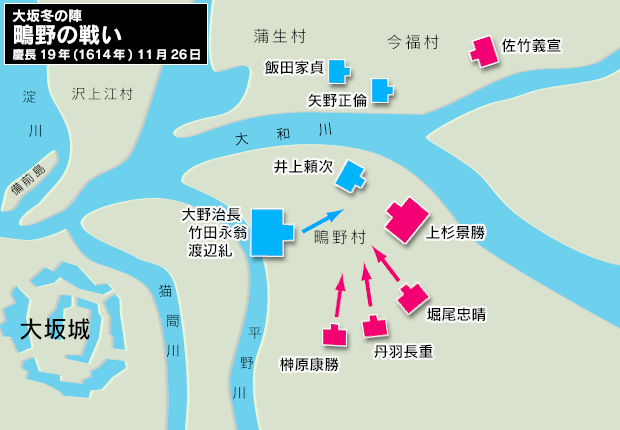
- Battle of Shigino. Uesugi forces are in red, Toyotomi forces in blue.
| Date | November 26, 1614 |
| Location | Shigino, on the Kizu river, Japan 34°41′28″N 135°32′58″E |
| Result | Inconclusive |

Belligerents
| Tokugawa shogunate | Toyotomi clan |

Commanders and leaders
| Uesugi Kagekatsu; Niwa Nagashige; Horio Tadaharu | Inoue Yoritsugu; Ōno Harunaga |

Strength
| 5,000 | 2,000 |
- Location within Japan

The Battle of Shigino, fought in the final months of 1614, was one battle during the Siege of Osaka, a campaign by the Tokugawa shogunate to destroy or subjugate the last resistance to its power, the Toyotomi clan.

== History ==
Five thousand Tokugawa troops, led by Uesugi Kagekatsu, engaged 2000 troops loyal to the Toyotomi at a place called Shigino, across the Yamato River (now called the Neyagawa) from the site of the Battle of Imafuku, which took place several weeks earlier. The Tokugawa troops received reinforcements from Niwa Nagashige and Horio Tadaharu, whose forces included a number of arquebusiers. They brought orders from the Tokugawa commander, Tokugawa Ieyasu, that Uesugi Kagekatsu should withdraw from the battle and take a rest; Kagekatsu insisted that this was an affront to his honor, as the Uesugi traditionally would not retire from a battle in progress.
