= Kimura Shigenari =

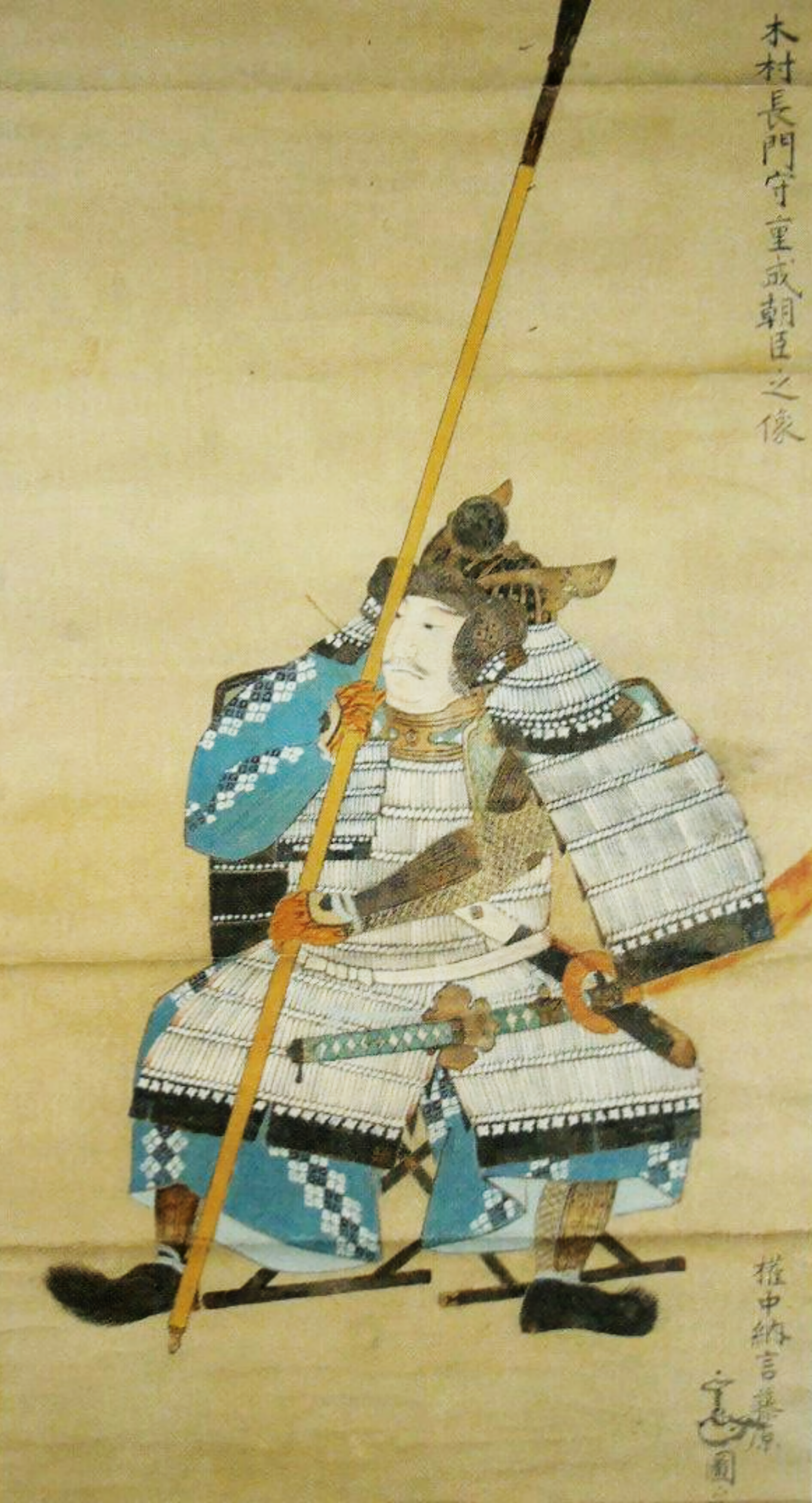
Kimura Shigenari

Kimura Shigenari (木村 重成; Japanese pronunciation: [kʲi.mɯ.ɾa (|) ɕi.ɡeꜜ.na.ɾʲi, -ɕi.ŋeꜜ-], 1593 – June 2, 1615) was a Japanese samurai of the early Edo period. A retainer of the Toyotomi clan, Shigenari fought at the Siege of Osaka (leading Toyotomi forces at the Battle of Imafuku) and died in battle.

Kimura Shigenari was a son of Kimura Shigekore, also known as Kimura Hitachi no suke (vice-governor of Hitachi), one of the chief counselors of Toyotomi Hidetsugu, but much of his origin remains uncertain. His mother was Toyotomi Hideyori's wet nurse: that was why Shigenari became Hideyori's page at an early age and his vassal later.

At the Winter Siege of Osaka (1614), his first campaign, Shigenari commanded an army as a general and fought well. In recognition of his distinguished deed in that battle Hideyori bestowed on him a testimonial that acclaimed him as the “peerless hero of the nation”, together with a short sword made by Masamune, the famous swordsmith. However, he returned those rewards immediately, because of his loyalty and absolute trust in the Toyotomi family.

A year later, during the Summer Siege of Osaka, he left the castle walls, leading the main force of the Toyotomi army and fought against Ii Tadataka's troops. In that battle, Shigenari wore a suit of armor called kozane made of gold and silver scales, with a white horo (a mantle meant to disrupt the flight of oncoming arrows), and rode a black horse. He fought an all-out battle, charging with a 6-yard-spear himself, and was caught in the action. He was beheaded, and the head was taken to Tokugawa Ieyasu, who saw it neatly trimmed on the forehead and the hair tidily cut and perfumed with incense. Everything indicated that he had gone into the battle well prepared to die in the field.

== Family ==
- Kimura Shigekore (Ja:木村重茲): Father
