= Kimura Shigekore =

Japanese samurai

Kimura Shigekore (木村 重茲; died August 20, 1595) was a Japanese samurai of the Azuchi-Momoyama period, who served the Toyotomi clan. He had been rewarded for his service in Toyotomi Hideyoshi's Korean campaign but was then implicated in a plot against Hideyoshi by Toyotomi Hidetsugu and forced to commit ritual suicide, seppuku. His son Kimura Shigenari was a commander under Hideyoshi and Toyotomi Hideyoshi.
