= Asano Nagaakira =

Japanese samurai

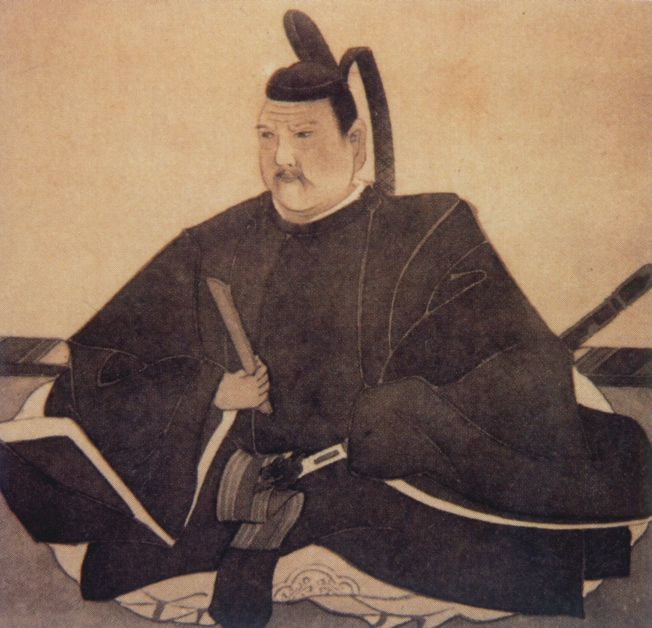

Lord of Ashimori
- In office 1610–1613
- Preceded by: Kinoshita Katsutoshi
- Succeeded by: Kinoshita Toshifusa

Lord of Wakayama
- In office 1613–1619
- Preceded by: Asano Yoshinaga
- Succeeded by: Tokugawa Yorinobu

Lord of Hiroshima
- In office 1619–1632
- Preceded by: Fukushima Masanori
- Succeeded by: Asano Mitsuakira

Personal details
- Born: 1586
- Died: 1632 (aged 45–46)
- Spouse: Furihime

Asano Nagaakira (浅野 長晟; March 18, 1586 – October 16, 1632) was a Japanese samurai of the early Edo period who served as daimyō of Wakayama Domain, and was later transferred to the Hiroshima Domain.

== Biography ==
Born Asano Iwamatsu, he was the son of Asano Nagamasa, who was a senior retainer of Toyotomi Hideyoshi. In 1594, Nagaakira was made a retainer of Toyotomi Hideyoshi, and awarded a stipend of 3,000 koku. Allying his forces to Tokugawa Ieyasu six years later at the Battle of Sekigahara, he was subsequently awarded with the 24,000 koku Ashimori Domain. As his brother Yukinaga died heirless in 1613, Nagaakira succeeded him, becoming daimyō of Wakayama Domain. At the Siege of Ōsaka, he commanded a portion of Tokugawa Ieyasu's army. In the summer of 1615, Toyotomi Hideyori's Western Army moved to attack Asano's castle at Wakayama. Though most of Asano's forces were at Ōsaka, besieging Toyotomi's fortress, the remaining garrison outnumbered the Western warriors, and Asano led his men in sallying forth to meet the enemy in the Battle of Kashii.

Asano also fought in the Battle of Tennōji, the decisive final battle in the Siege of Ōsaka, where he commanded Tokugawa's rear guard. In 1619, he was granted the lordship of Hiroshima Domain in Aki Province, which would be the home of the Asano family until the Meiji Restoration. Nagaakira was married to Furihime, the widow of Gamō Hideyuki and third daughter of Tokugawa Ieyasu.

== Family ==
- Father: Asano Nagamasa
- Mother: Cho-Sei-in (d.1616), adopted daughter of Asano Nagakatsu, daughter of Sugihara Sadatoshi and Asahidono.
- Wife: Furihime (1580-1617), third daughter of the shōgun Tokugawa Ieyasu
- Children:
  - Asano Nagaharu (1614-1675)
  - Asano Mitsuakira by Furihime

Preceded by Kinoshita Katsutoshi	Daimyō of Ashimori; 1610–1613	Succeeded by Kinoshita Toshifusa
Preceded by Asano Yoshinaga	Daimyō of Wakayama; 1613–1619	Succeeded by Tokugawa Yorinobu
Preceded by Fukushima Masanori	Daimyō of Hiroshima; 1619–1632	Succeeded by Asano Mitsuakira
