= Rōya bugyō =

The Rōya bugyō (牢屋奉行) was a government office under Japan's Tokugawa shogunate, concerned with the management of prisons. The position was hereditary in the Ishide clan, with the head of each generation taking the name Ishide Tatewaki (石出帯刀). The duties of the Rōya bugyō included witnessing executions, summoning witnesses for court cases, and listening to hearings, as well as general oversight of the Tokugawa prison system (particularly the main prison at Kodenma-chō).

The Rōya bugyō's official residence was immediately adjoining the same prison, in Kodenma-chō 1-chōme.

== List of Rōya bugyō ==
- Ishide Tatewaki

== See also ==
- Bugyō
