= Battle of Tennōji =

1615 battle

- Part of the Siege of Osaka
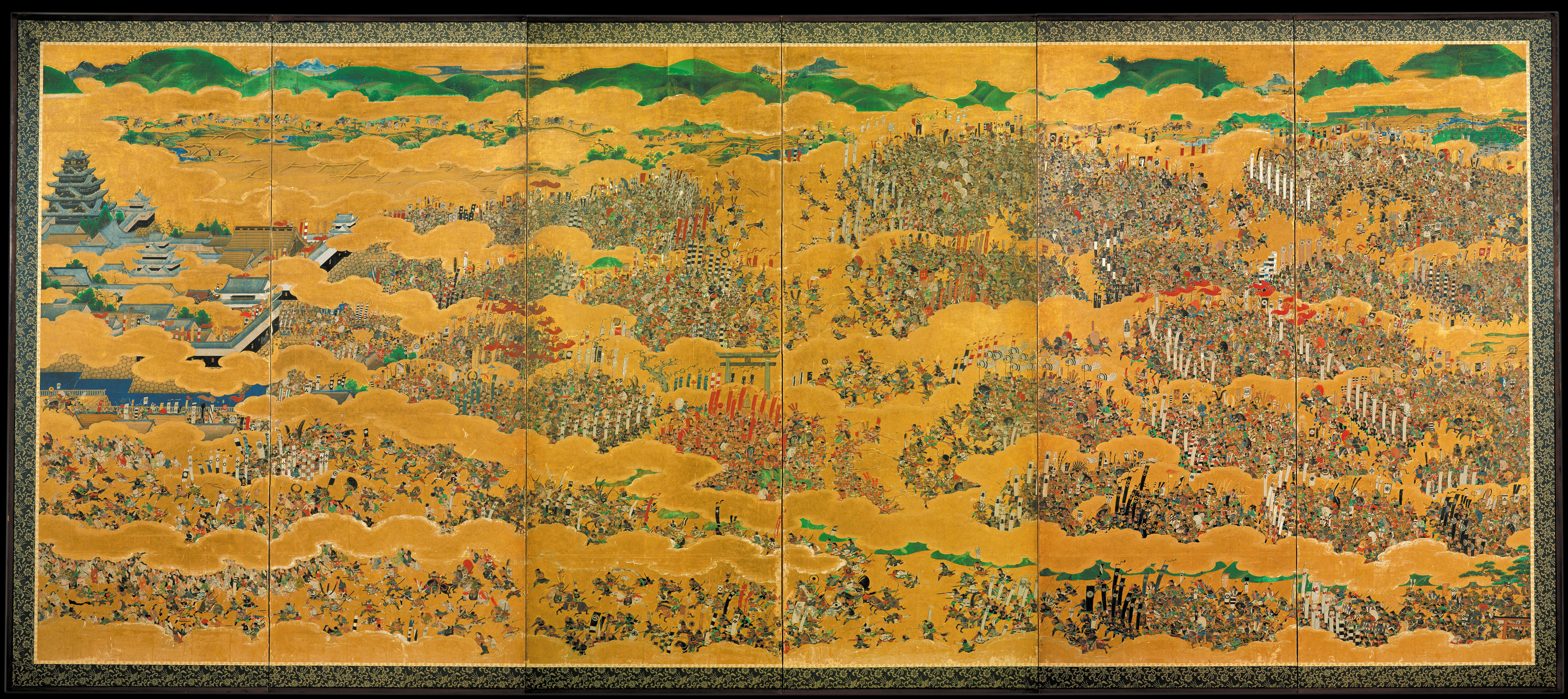
Date	June 3, 1615
Location	south of Osaka Castle, Osaka 34°39′16″N 135°30′40″E
Result	Tokugawa victory
Territorial changes	Toyotomi Clan eliminated End of the siege of Osaka

Belligerents
Tokugawa clan	Toyotomi clan

Commanders and leaders
Tokugawa Ieyasu; Tokugawa Hidetada; Matsudaira Tadanao	Toyotomi Hideyori ‡‡ Yodo-dono ‡‡ Sanada Yukimura †

Strength
150,000	More than 71,000

Casualties and losses
8,000 dead	15,000–18,600 dead
- Location within Japan

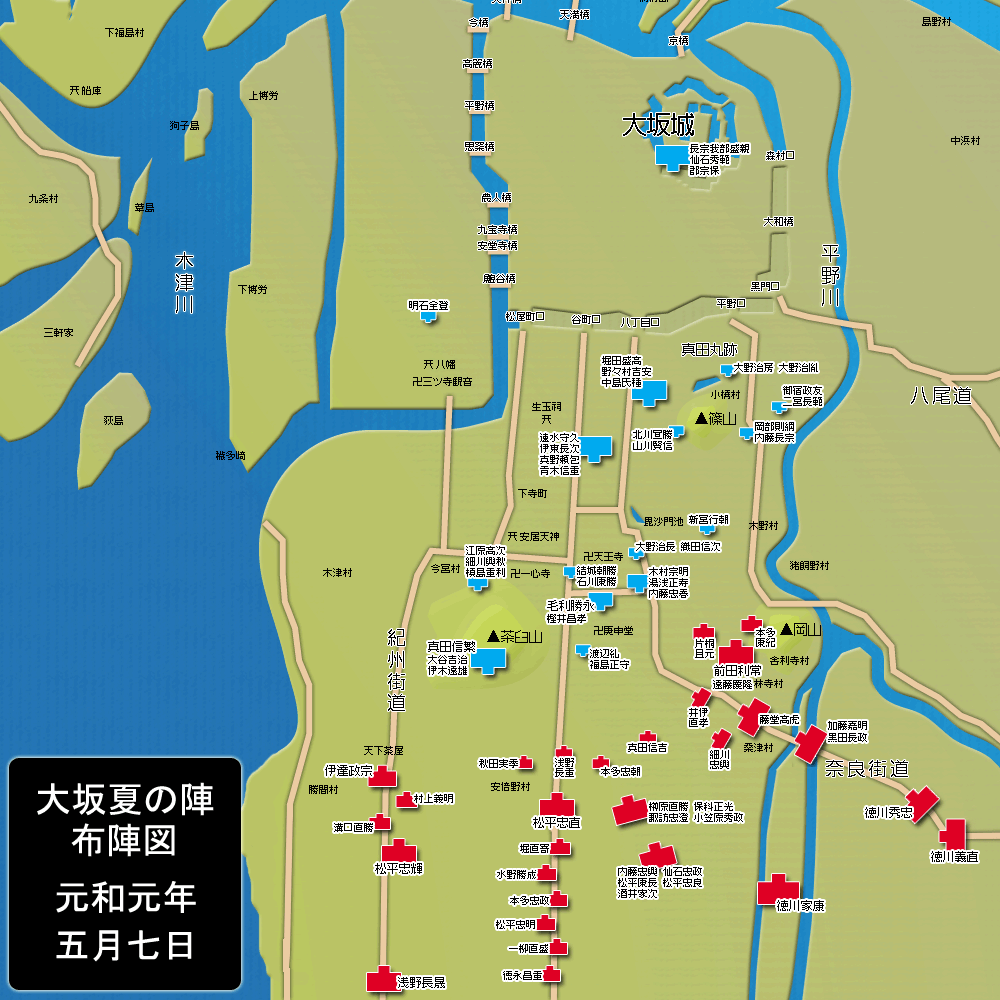
Setup of Battle of Tennōji. June 3, 1615

The Battle of Tennōji (天王寺・岡山の戦い, Tennōji Okayama no tatakai) was fought on 3 June, 1615 between the forces of Tokugawa Ieyasu and Toyotomi Hideyori. Tokugawa was besieging Osaka, and Hideyori had planned a counterattack. Both sides were plagued by mistakes until Hideyori's side finally fell. He presumably committed suicide. The Toyotomi army suffered nearly 50% casualties in this battle, with more than 15,000 dead. This was also the final battle of Sanada Yukimura.

== Battle ==
The last resistance of the Osaka Garrison was at Tennoji, outside of the castle. Hideyori, son of the legendary Toyotomi Hideyoshi, made up a plan to try and turn the tide of the siege. A council of war was held on 2 June 1615 and the plan was determined that Sanada, Ōno Harunaga, and the other commanders would launch an attack to hold the Tokugawa front, while Akashi Morishige would sweep around to attack the rear. In the midst of the rear attack, Hideyori would ride out of the garrison, leading the attack under the banner of Hideyoshi.

But the Tokugawa were led by Ieyasu himself, and even though Ieyasu was wounded by a spear thrust, Sanada was killed in action, beheaded by a samurai named Nishio Nizaemon after he sat on a stool to rest. Thus, Morishige's attack failed as well. This left only Hideyori to defend the castle. Ieyasu left Ii Naotaka to keep watch over the Toyotomi family and secure the castle. Naotaka began to blast the castle with every piece of artillery available and it soon caught fire. Hideyori and his mother Yodo-dono committed seppuku. The eight-year old son of Hideyori, the last of the Toyotomi, was decapitated, along with Chōsokabe Morichika, along with so many rōnin that it was said their heads stretched from Kyoto to Fushimi.

Meanwhile, the Ii clan has send their unit of ninja under the lead of Miura Yo'emon, Shimotani Sanzo, Okuda Kasa'emon, and Saga Kita'emon to fought together with Tokugawa's regular soldiers in the south gate of the castle.

Aside from minor skirmishes, the Battle of Tennōji was the last battle between two great samurai armies ever fought.
