= Ōno Harunaga =

Samurai of the early Edo period

Ōno Harunaga 大野 治長
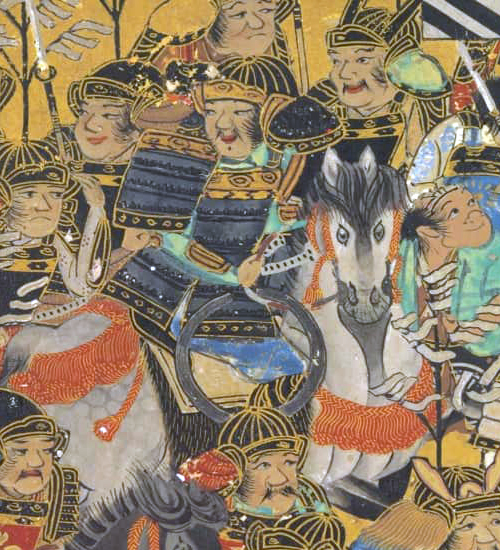

Karō of Toyotomi clan
- In office 1614–1615
- Preceded by: Katagiri Katsumoto
- Succeeded by: none

Personal details
- Born: 1569
- Died: 4 June 1615 (aged 45–46) Battle of Tennōji
- Relatives: Yodo-dono (foster sister)

Military service
- Allegiance: Eastern Army; Toyotomi clan
- Battles/wars: Battle of Sekigahara; Siege of Osaka; Battle of Kashii; Battle of Shigino; Battle of Tennōji

Ōno Harunaga (大野 治長; 1569 – 4 June 1615) was a general under Toyotomi Hideyori, and fought in the Siege of Osaka in 1615. He became lord of Osaka castle after the Battle of Sekigahara. Ono led forces against those of Wakayama Castle in the Battle of Kashii, also the Battle of Shigino, and the Battle of Tennoji, where he was killed in action. He held the rank at court of Junior Fifth Rank. Harunaga had a fiefdom of 15,000 koku.

== Life ==
In 1569, Ono Harunaga was born in the capital of Japan at this time, Kyoto. He was the son of Ōkurakyō no Tsubone, who had served as wet-nurse to Yodo-dono, he served as bodyguard with a stipend of 3,000 koku given from Toyotomi Hideyoshi. Following Hideyoshi's death, he served as an advisor close to Toyotomi Hideyori.

In 1599 following questioning by Tokugawa Ieyasu, he was banished to Shimotsuke Province, under suspicion of being a ringleader of a failed plot to assassinate Tokugawa Ieyasu that had been hatched by servants of Tokugawa Ieyasu and Honda Masanobu.

In the following year, 1600, Ono Harunaga joined forces with the Eastern army at the Battle of Sekigahara and distinguished himself in battle, thereby earning a pardon for his crime from Ieyasu. Following the battle, under orders from Ieyasu he bore a note from Ieyasu to the Toyotomi clan, in which Ieyasu declared, 'I bear no animosity towards the Toyotomi clan' after which he remained in Osaka and did not return to Edo.

In 1614, upon the banishment of Toyotomi's chief elder retainer Katagiri Katsumoto, Ono came to be in a position to lead the Toyotomi family. Afterwards, the pro-war faction within the Toyotomi family gained ascendancy and enlisted the services of rōnin from various parts of the country to take part in the Siege of Osaka winter campaign however; Harunaga passively sued for peace, earning him the animosity of Sanada Yukimura's pro-war faction.

In 1615 during the summer campaign of the Siege of Osaka, Harunaga sent Senhime (daughter of Tokugawa Hidetada and Hideyori's wife) as a messenger for Ono, to plead for clemency for Hideyori and Yodo-dono, on the condition that he commit ritual suicide, but subsequently he and Hideyori committed suicide in a mountain hamlet in the vicinity of Osaka Castle. He died at the age of 47.

Records show that rumours abounded throughout the Edo period regarding Harunaga having an adulterous affair with Yodo-dono, and some accounts maintain that Hideyori was not a biological child of Hideyoshi, but of Harunaga and Yodo-dono. As described above, because he was a foster brother to Yodo-dono, it is likely that their relationship was extremely close; however, with the decline of the fortune of the Toyotomi family and the accompanying 'futility of ruin,' it can also be thought that the rumors of the sin of adultery were created with a view to casting him as an evil person (from a Confucian sense of resignation).
