= Siege of Osaka =

1614-15 series of battles in Japan at the end of the Sengoku Period

- Part of the late Sengoku Period and the early Edo period
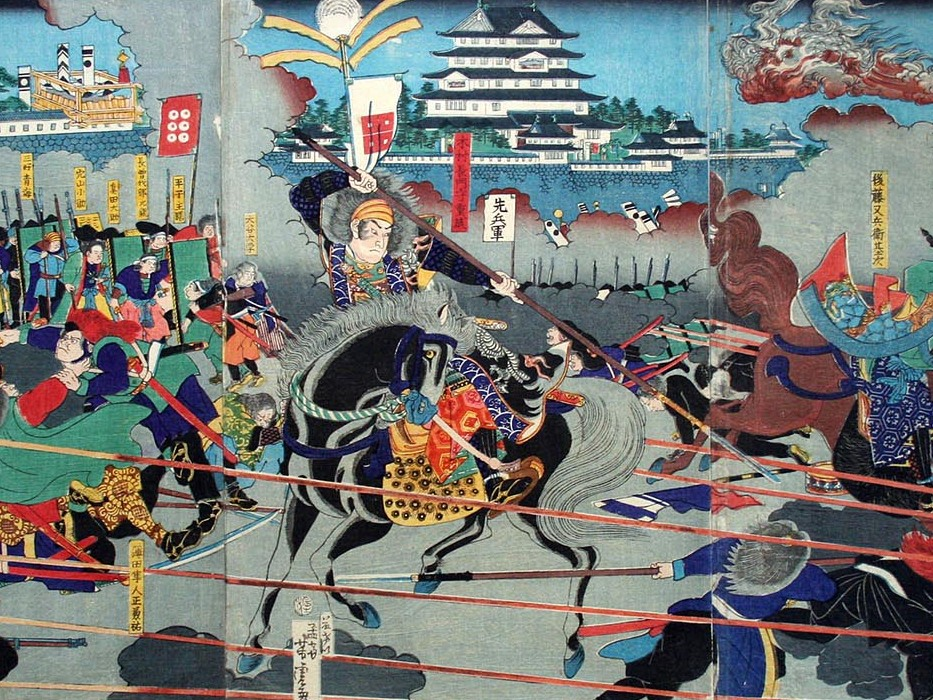
Date	November 8, 1614 – January 22, 1615 and May – June 1615
Location	Osaka Castle, Osaka, Japan and surrounding areas
Result	Tokugawa victory
Territorial changes	Destruction of the Toyotomi Clan

Belligerents
Tokugawa shogunate and its loyalist banners: Matsudaira clan; Date clan; Honda clan; Tōdō clan; Kuroda clan; Ii clan; Hosokawa clan; Maeda clan; Hachisuka clan; Niwa clan; Asano clan; Mizuno clan; Sakai clan; Kyōgoku clan; Satake clan; Uesugi clan; Mōri clan; Sanada clan	Toyotomi clan and its loyalist banners: Oda clan (defected to Tokugawa side); Tsutsui clan

Commanders and leaders
Tokugawa Ieyasu; Tokugawa Hidetada; Todo Takatora; Ii Naotaka; Matsudaira Tadanao; Date Masamune; Honda Masanobu; Honda Tadatomo †; Satake Yoshinobu; Asano Nagaakira; Maeda Toshitsune; Uesugi Kagekatsu; Mōri Hidenari; Sanada Nobuyuki; Hosokawa Tadaoki; Mizuno Katsushige; Tachibana Muneshige	Toyotomi Hideyori ‡‡ Yodo-dono ‡‡ Sanada Yukimura †; Gotō Mototsugu †; Tsutsui Sadatsugu †; Akashi Takenori; Chōsokabe Morichika (executed); Mōri Katsunaga †; Fukushima Takaharu; Kimura Shigenari †; Ōno Harunaga †; Sanada Daisuke †; Ban Naoyuki †; Oda Nobukatsu (defected to Tokugawa side); Hosokawa Okiaki †

Strength
164,000 (winter); 150,000 (summer)	120,000 (winter); 60,000 (summer)

The siege of Osaka (大坂の役, Ōsaka no Eki; or, more commonly, 大坂の陣 Ōsaka no Jin) was a series of battles undertaken by the Japanese Tokugawa shogunate against the Toyotomi clan, ending in that clan's destruction. Divided into two stages, the winter campaign and the summer campaign, it lasted from 1614 to 1615. The siege put an end to the last major armed opposition to the establishment of the Tokugawa shogunate. The end of the conflict is sometimes called the Genna Armistice (元和偃武, Genna Enbu), because the era name was changed from Keichō to Genna immediately following the siege.

== Background ==
When Toyotomi Hideyoshi died in 1598, Japan came to be governed by the Council of Five Elders, among whom Tokugawa Ieyasu possessed the most authority. After defeating Ishida Mitsunari in the Battle of Sekigahara in 1600, Ieyasu essentially seized control of Japan for himself and abolished the council. In 1603, the Tokugawa shogunate was established with its capital at Edo. Hideyoshi's son Toyotomi Hideyori and his mother Yodo-dono were allowed to stay at Osaka Castle, a fortress that had served as Hideyoshi's residence. Hideyori remained confined to the castle for several years. In addition, as a mechanism of control, it was agreed that in the year 1603 he would marry the daughter of Tokugawa Hidetada, Senhime, who was related to both clans. Ieyasu sought to establish a powerful and stable regime under the rule of his own clan. Only the Toyotomi clan, led by Hideyori under the influence of Yodo-dono, remained an obstacle to that goal.

In 1611, Hideyori finally left Osaka, meeting with Ieyasu for two hours at Nijō Castle. Ieyasu was surprised by Hideyori's behavior, which ran contrary to popular belief that the boy was just "useless". This belief had been spread by Katagiri Katsumoto, Hideyori's personal guardian assigned by Ieyasu since 1599, and who had the intention of dissuading any aggression against the heir. In 1614, the Toyotomi clan rebuilt Osaka Castle. At the same time, the head of the clan sponsored the rebuilding of Hōkō-ji (Great Buddha of Kyoto) in Kyoto. These temple renovations included the casting of a great bronze bell, with inscriptions that read "May the nation be at peace" (国家安康, kokka ankō), and "May the lord and [his] vassals be prosperous and cheerful" (君臣豊楽, kunshin hōraku). The shogunate interpreted "kokka ankō" (国家安康) as shattering Ieyasu's name (家康) to curse him, and also interpreted "kunshin hōraku" (君臣豊楽) to mean "Toyotomi's force (豊臣) will rise again," which meant treachery against the shogunate. Tensions began to grow between the Tokugawa and the Toyotomi clans and only increased when Toyotomi began to gather a force of rōnin and enemies of the shogunate in Osaka. Ieyasu, despite having passed the title of shōgun to his son in 1605, nevertheless maintained significant influence.

After the Hoko-ji Temple Bell Incident, Yodo-dono sent Lady Okurakyo, Lady Aeba and Katagiri Katsumoto to Sunpu to see Tokugawa Ieyasu. In this meeting, Ieyasu hatched a plot to induce a split among the people of the Toyotomi family. On one hand, Ieyasu proposed a generous demand towards Lady Okurakyo. On the other hand, Ieyasu made severe demands on Katagiri Katsumoto, who represented the moderates and had been separately asking Ieyasu to save the Toyotomi family.

Despite Katagiri Katsumoto's attempts to mediate the situation, Ieyasu found the ideal pretext to take a belligerent attitude against Yodo-dono and Hideyori. The situation worsened in September of that year, when the news reached Edo that in Osaka they were grouping a large number of rōnin at the invitation of Hideyori. Katsumoto proposed that Yodo-dono be sent to Edo as a hostage with the desire to avoid hostilities, which she flatly refused. Suspecting him of trying to betray the Toyotomi clan, Yodo-dono banished Katsumoto and several other servants accused of treason from Osaka castle, sending them to the service of the Tokugawa clan. Consequently, any possibility of reaching an agreement with the shogunate was dissolved. This last incident led to the beginning of the siege of Osaka.

=== Preparations ===
As preparations, Hideyori sent many letters to most of the daimyo lords in Japan who he predicted would sympathize with the Toyotomi clan. However, his efforts were largely fruitless as his letters delivered by his couriers were rejected by many of the recipients. Hachisuka Iemasa at first was hesitant, until his son convinced him not to accept Hideyori’s invitation to rebel against the Shogunate. Meanwhile, Shimazu Tadatsune directly rejected his invitation as Tadatsune stated the Shimazu clan was still recovering from the Sekigahara war and had no intention to stand up against Ieyasu. Tadatsune also returned a sword gift from Hideyori. An envoy of the Toyotomi clan dispatched to convince Ikeda Tadakatsu, lord of Sumoto in Awaji Island and son of Ikeda Terumasa, also failed, as the Ikeda clan instead arrested the envoys. Furthermore, the Toyotomi clan also failed to convince the Mōri clan under the lead of Mōri Terumoto to join their side, Terumoto instead supported the Tokugawa shogunate, as on November 3, Terumoto ordered his vassals Mōri Motochikazu and Motoyuki Sugimori, who were in charge in Mori Hidemoto's absence, to send half of the troops east if Hidemoto asked them to march out to aid the shogunate in fighting the Toyotomi, while the remaining half, including Sugimori, Motoyoshi Nishi, and Shichirobei Misawa, were to stay in Chofu as caretakers, and to retreat to Hagi if something happened that would make it impossible to maintain Chofu.

Meanwhile, the shogunate also prepared their war efforts by stockpiling their ammunition. In May, a company of British merchants tried to sell lead in Hirado, but failed to find a buyer. This incident was reported by William Adams to the shogunate, who purchased the entire quantity of lead on offer. Furthermore, in the same month a Dutch merchant company was also selling lead, which was also purchased by the shogunate. Later in June, Tokugawa Ieyasu purchased a large amount of cannons, gunpowder, and bullets from British merchants, with Adams acting as the middleman, the prices being 1 kan for cannons, 2.3 bun for gunpowder, and 1.6 bun for bullets.

== Winter campaign ==
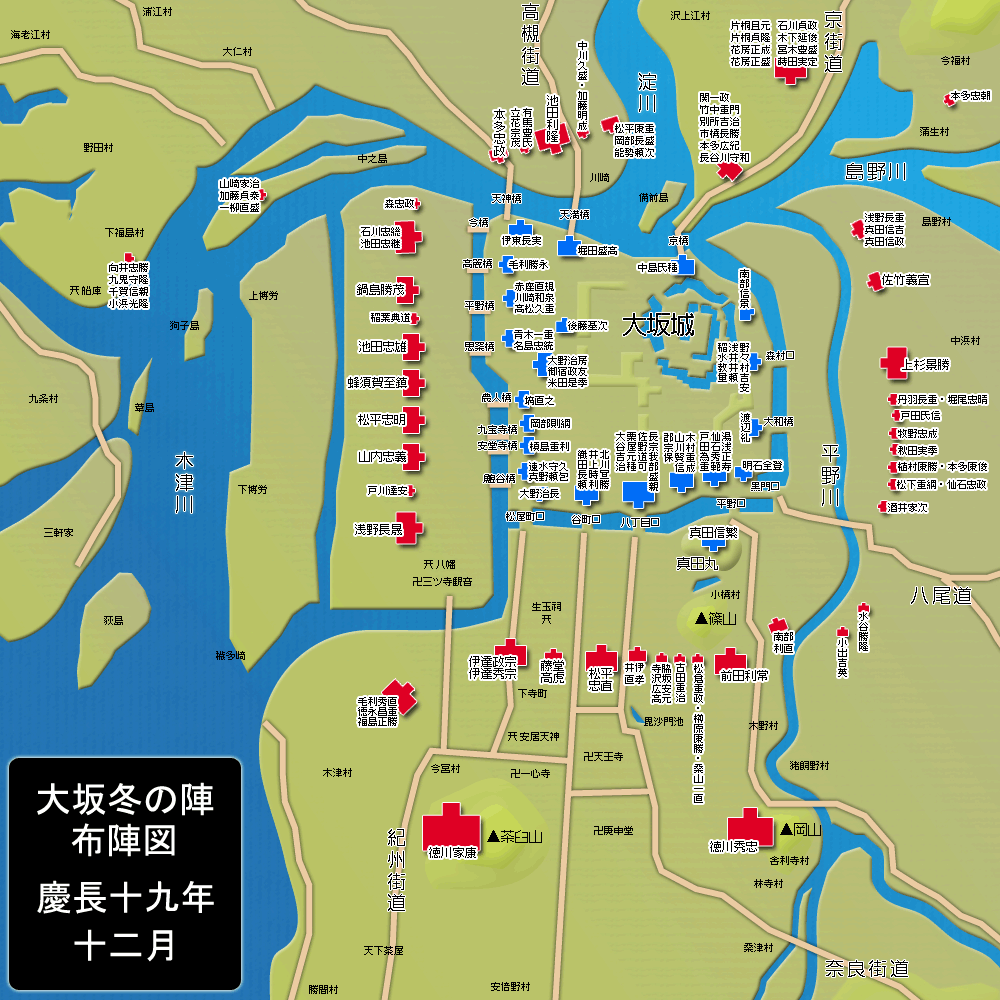
Setup of winter campaign, November 1614

In November of 1614, Tokugawa Ieyasu decided not to let this force grow any larger, and led 164,000 men to Osaka. The count does not include the troops of Shimazu Tadatsune, an ally of the Toyotomi cause who nevertheless did not send troops to Osaka. The siege began on 19 November, when Ieyasu led 3,000 men across the Kizu River, destroying the fort there. A week later, he attacked the village of Imafuku with 1,500 men, against a defending force of 600. With the aid of a squad wielding arquebuses (a weapon widely used by Japanese forces at this time), the shogunate forces claimed another victory. Several more small forts and villages were attacked before the siege of Osaka Castle itself began on 4 December.

The Sanada-maru was an earthwork barbican defended by Sanada Yukimura and 7,000 men, on behalf of the Toyotomi. The Shōgun's armies were repeatedly repelled, and Sanada and his men launched a number of attacks against the siege lines, breaking through three times. Ieyasu then resorted to artillery (including 17 imported European cannons and 300 domestic wrought iron cannons) and men digging under the walls.

During this siege, the Tokugawa forces also deployed irregular auxiliaries such as Ninja clans from Iga province under the lead of Ii Naotaka, the head of the Ii clan. Aside from Naotaka's ninja troops, there were also other Iga ikki warriors under Hattori Hanzō, and Yamaoka Kagetsuge. Aside from the ninja forces, other irregular elements from Iga province such as Tōdō Takatora's Musokunin" (part time samurai) also fought in this battle.

=== Bombing of Osaka Castle ===
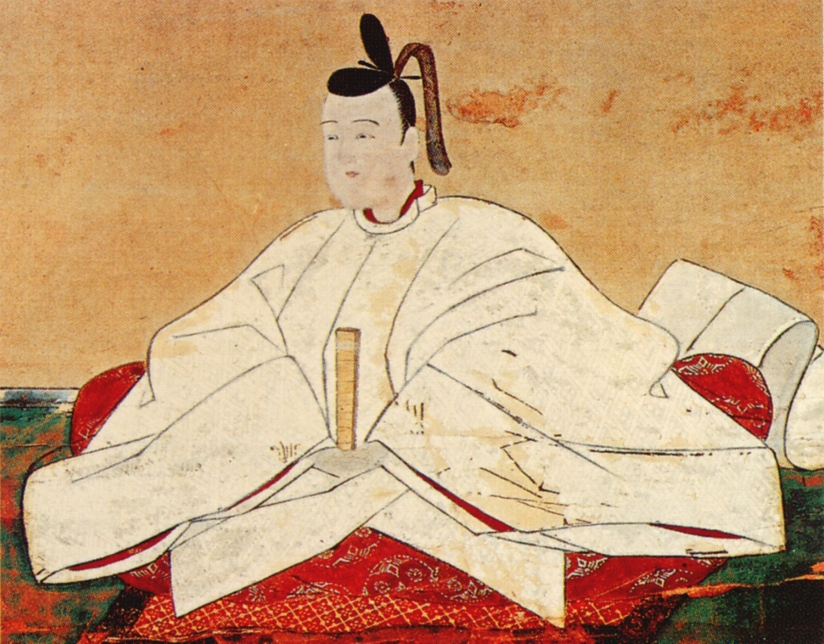
Toyotomi Hideyori

Ieyasu, realizing that the castle would not fall easily and after consulting with his top advisers, ordered a limited bombing which began on January 8, 1615. For three consecutive days, his forces bombarded the fortress at 10 o'clock at night and at dawn. Meanwhile, miners were making tunnels under the walls and arrows were thrown inwards with messages requesting the surrender of the occupants. By January 15, with no response from the besieged, Ieyasu began an incessant bombardment that had a mainly psychological effect to diminish the morale of the defenders. The stone bases of Japanese castles were invulnerable to the artillery of the era and the structure of the castle remained virtually undamaged.

Realizing that the defenses were extremely strong, Ieyasu tried to convince Sanada Yukimura to change sides. Yukimura, who felt a strong antipathy for Ieyasu, rejected the bribe and made the attempt public. Ieyasu then bribed another captain, a commander named Nanjo Tadashige, asking him to open the castle gates. The attempted treason was discovered and Nanjo beheaded, so Ieyasu changed his strategy. Ieyasu ordered his men to deliberately bomb Yodo-dono's quarters, and when they had found the range, a cannon hit its target, killing two of her maids.

During the night of the 16th, Ban Naotsugu, in charge of the defenses of one of the west side doors, carried out a night attack on the troops of Hachisuka Yoshishige, killing several enemies before retreating. The bombing continued the next day, on the mournful anniversary of Toyotomi Hideyoshi's death. Ieyasu thought that on that day Hideyori would be in the temple dedicated to his father, so he ordered that his forces fire towards the place. The projectile almost hit Hideyori's head, hitting one of the pillars of Yodo-dono's quarters. She became terrified and pressed to reach an arrangement with the shogunate.

== Peace negotiations ==
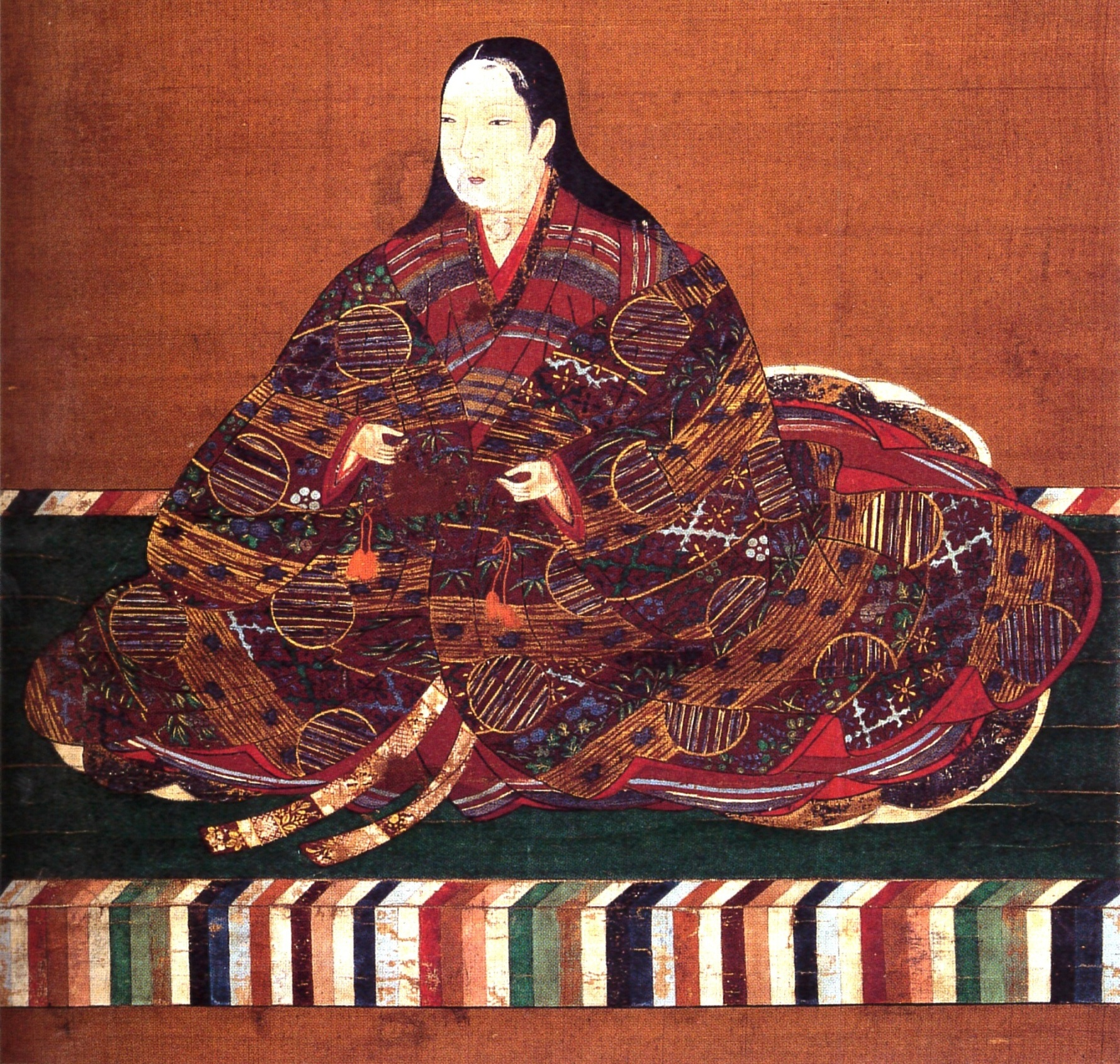
Yodo-dono, Hideyori's mother played a crucial role throughout the siege.

On January 17, Ieyasu sent Honda Masazumi, accompanied by Lady Acha, to meet with Kyōgoku Tadataka, son of Ohatsu, younger sister of Yodo-dono. During the meeting, Lady Acha assured Ohatsu that Ieyasu had no ill will to Hideyori and that he wished to forgive him, but Hidetada was stubborn about taking the castle, so he had thousands of miners working in tunnels under the pits. On the other hand Honda assured that Ieyasu would allow Hideyori to keep Osaka as his fief, but in case he wanted to leave he would give him another one with higher income, besides that all his captains and soldiers would be given free transit when leaving or they could stay inside if they wanted to, but he would need some hostages as a sign of goodwill.

Ohatsu conveyed the terms to Yodo-dono who, in terror, asked Ōno Harunaga, Oda Nobukatsu, and Hideyori's top seven advisers to accept the terms of the surrender. Lady Acha and Honda met again with Ohatsu, Lady Aeba and Ōkurakyō no Tsubone (Yodo-dono's former wet nurse and one of the most influential figures in Osaka castle), and they told him that the outer pit should be filled by Ieyasu's men. On January 21, the Oda delivered their children as hostages and Hideyori sent Kimura to Chausayama to close the agreement. Ieyasu issued a document, sealed with blood from his finger and signed also by Hidetada, which said:

(that) the rōnin in the castle are not found guilty; that Hideyori's income remain the same as before; that Yodo-dono is not asked to live in Edo; that if Hideyori chooses to leave Ōsaka he may choose any other province as his fiefdom; that his person is inviolable.

On January 22, Ieyasu received a solemn oath from Hideyori and Yodo-dono that Hideyori would not rebel against Ieyasu or Hidetada and that he would consult any matter directly with him. Both Honda Tadamasa and Honda Masayuri were entrusted to dismantle the castle's exterior defenses, so the soldiers of the shogunate tore down the walls and filled the outer moat. Hideyori did complain indignantly to the workers that this had not been part of the arrangement, but the response he received was that they only followed Ieyasu's orders. Honda Masazumi blamed the workers for having misunderstood their instructions because they were already filling the interior moat as well. Although the work stopped momentarily, soon the soldiers of the shogunate continued, so Yodo-dono sent one of her bridesmaids and Ōno to Kyoto. Several days later Ieyasu gave an elusive official response, where he assured that since he had signed an eternal peace, the walls were not necessary.

During the process of reconciliation, Oda Nagamasu, one of the attendants of Osaka castle since before the war, left the castle and sent his child to the Tokugawa shogunate as a hostage and worked hard to reconcile the Toyotomi side with the shogunate. It was argued that even from the start of war, Nagamasa was working for in Ieyasu's favor to seek peace between the two factions. According to Sunpu-ki record, the Toyotomi clan during this time were divided in three factions:

1. The first faction were led by Ōno Harunaga. This faction favored reconciliation with the shogunate.
2. The second faction were led by Kimura Shigenari. This faction was largely indecisive in their attitude.
3. The third faction were led by Chōsokabe Motochika. This faction consisted of political war hawks who favored continuing the war.

In the end, Nagamasu decided to leave the Osaka castle as he could not maintain the reconcilliatory faction's voice within the Toyotomi clan.

=== End of the peace treaty ===
Ieyasu left Osaka for Kyoto on January 24, meeting with Emperor Go-Mizunoo at a formal hearing on the 28th, where he informed the emperor that the war had come to an end. Hidetada remained in place to supervise the work of destruction of the defenses, arriving in Edo on March 13. By then, news reached the capital that the Toyotomi camp was once again seeking to enlist rōnin into its service. This information led Ieyasu to order Hideyori to relinquish and abandon the Osaka fief.

Even from the moment when peace was being signed, the Toyotomi command proposed to launch a night attack on the Tokugawa camp, although it was finally decided not to do so. Shortly after Hideyori began to receive reports of the true intentions of Ieyasu, so they began the work of digging out the moats and recruiting troops. Hideyori and his main generals agreed that unlike the first campaign, this time it would be appropriate to take the offensive. Also, it was arranged to secure the areas surrounding Osaka and take Kyoto to control the emperor, so that he would declare Ieyasu to be a rebel against the Imperial throne. Following the rumors of what the Toyotomi army planned, the population of Kyoto began to flee from the city, and even a commander of the shogunate, Furuta Shigenari, was sentenced to death, suspected of being part of a plot to burn down Kyoto and apprehend the emperor.

Through his agent, Gotō Shōzaburō, who infiltrated Osaka to gather information on March 12, Ieyasu learned that the Toyotomi had stockpiled rice and kept employing the rōnin mercenaries in Osaka. In response to these reports, Ieyasu issued a ban on March 14 to prohibit ships loaded with annual rice from landing in Osaka and selling their provisions, which was implemented particularly to the daimyo governors from western regions of Japan such as Kyushu and Shikoku. Faced with these bans, the Toyotomi side began to show signs of internal division due to the problem of rōnin mercenaries roaming in Osaka. Hideyori was troubled that the ever-increasing number of rōnin, prompting a temporary solution by providing them with gold and silver to stop them from running wild, although at the expense of the Toyotomi clan financially. Meanwhile, Ono Harunaga voiced his disagreement with financing the Rōnin as they now had a peace treaty with the Shogunate. Nevertheless, Hideyori decided to allocate most of their trading profits from the Port of Osaka to finance these rōnin despite the crisis. Furthermore, Hideyori tried to solve this problem by requesting one of the neighboring provinces to be handed to him to increase the tax incomes during the meeting with Ieyasu on March 15. However, his request was rejected, causing unrest in Osaka as the provisions in the city became less day by day. Hideyori expressed his decision to move from Osaka to Koriyama in Yamato Province, as Ieyasu instructed which was agreed to by his vassals. However, the rōnin threatened that if he did that, they would keep fighting Ieyasu even without Hideyori and commit suicide, forcing Hideyori to gave up his decision and agree with their decision to fight the Shogunate once more.

Ieyasu left Shizuoka on May 3 to Nagoya, where his ninth son married on the 11th of the same month in the castle of that city. The next day he met a traitor from the Toyotomi camp, Oda Yuraku, who informed him that there were several factions within the castle, that the war councils rarely ended in anything conclusive and that Yodo-dono generally intervened in all matters. Later, he went to Nijō Castle, where he arrived on May 17 and met there on the 21 or 22 with Hidetada, who arrived with the troops ready to go to Osaka.

== Summer campaign ==
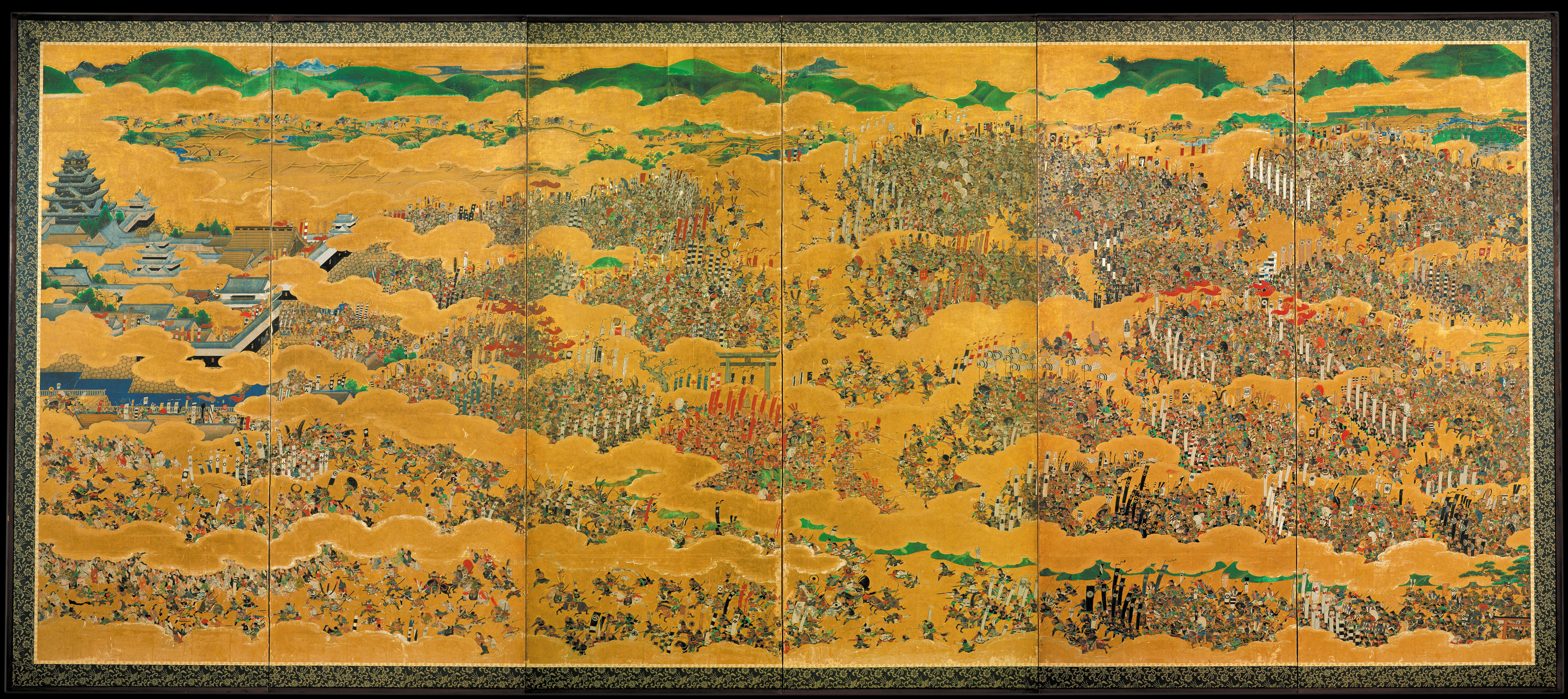
Siege of Osaka, 17th century Japanese painting commissioned by Kuroda Nagamasa, depicting 5071 people and 21 generals.

In April 1615, Ieyasu received word that Toyotomi Hideyori was gathering even more troops than in the previous November, and that he was trying to stop the filling of the moat. Toyotomi forces began to attack contingents of the Tokugawa forces near Osaka. On 26 May (Keichō 20, 29th day of 4th month) at the Battle of Kashii, Toyotomi forces under the command of Ono Harufusa and Ban Danemon engaged with forces of Asano Nagaakira, an ally of the Shōgun. Tachibana Muneshige now served as military advisor of the second shogun, Tokugawa Hidetada, as his military strategist and in charge of guarding the area. Muneshige correctly predicted the movements of the general of Toyotomi, Ono Harufusa's troops and guided Hidetada's troops. Toyotomi forces sustained heavy losses and Ban Danemon was killed.

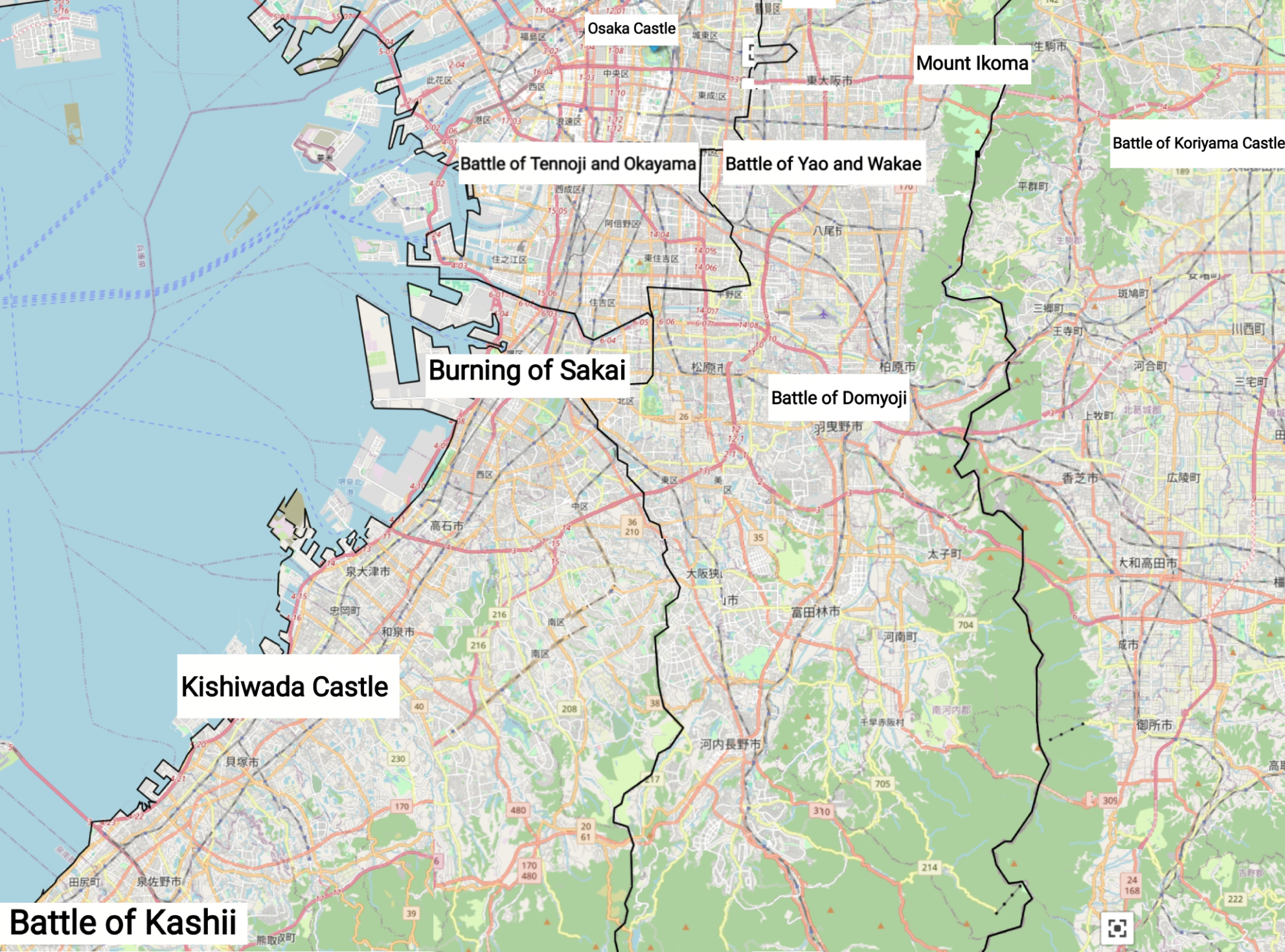
Map of important events and locations during the Summer siege.

On 2 June (Keichō 20, 6th day of 5th month), the Battle of Dōmyōji took place. Toyotomi forces tried to stop the enemy approaching from Yamato Province along the Yamato-gawa river. According to "Hyuga no kami memorandum" record, Katsunari disregarded Ieyasu's order to not engage the enemy first and charging his forces towards Mototsugu position, practically eliminating Mototsugu's entire army. After Mototsugu was killed, Katsunari then advanced further with his troops to Honda Village, where he clashed against another Toyotomi general named Watanabe Tadasu, and where he fatally injured Tadasu. Another prominent Toyotomi general named Susukida Kanesuke was also defeated by Katsunari's troops. Another Toyotomi general, Susukida Kanesuke, was killed in the fighting. Toyotomi commander Sanada Yukimura engaged in a battle with Date Masamune forces, but soon retreated towards Osaka Castle. Tokugawa forces did not pursue Sanada. The same day Chōsokabe Morichika and Tōdō Takatora battled at Yao. Another battle took place at Wakae around the same time, between Kimura Shigenari and Ii Naotaka. Chōsokabe's forces achieved victory, but Kimura Shigenari was deflected by the left wing of Ii Naotaka's army. The main Tokugawa forces moved to assist Todo Takatora after Shigenari's death, and Chōsokabe withdrew for the time being.

=== Fall of Osaka Castle ===
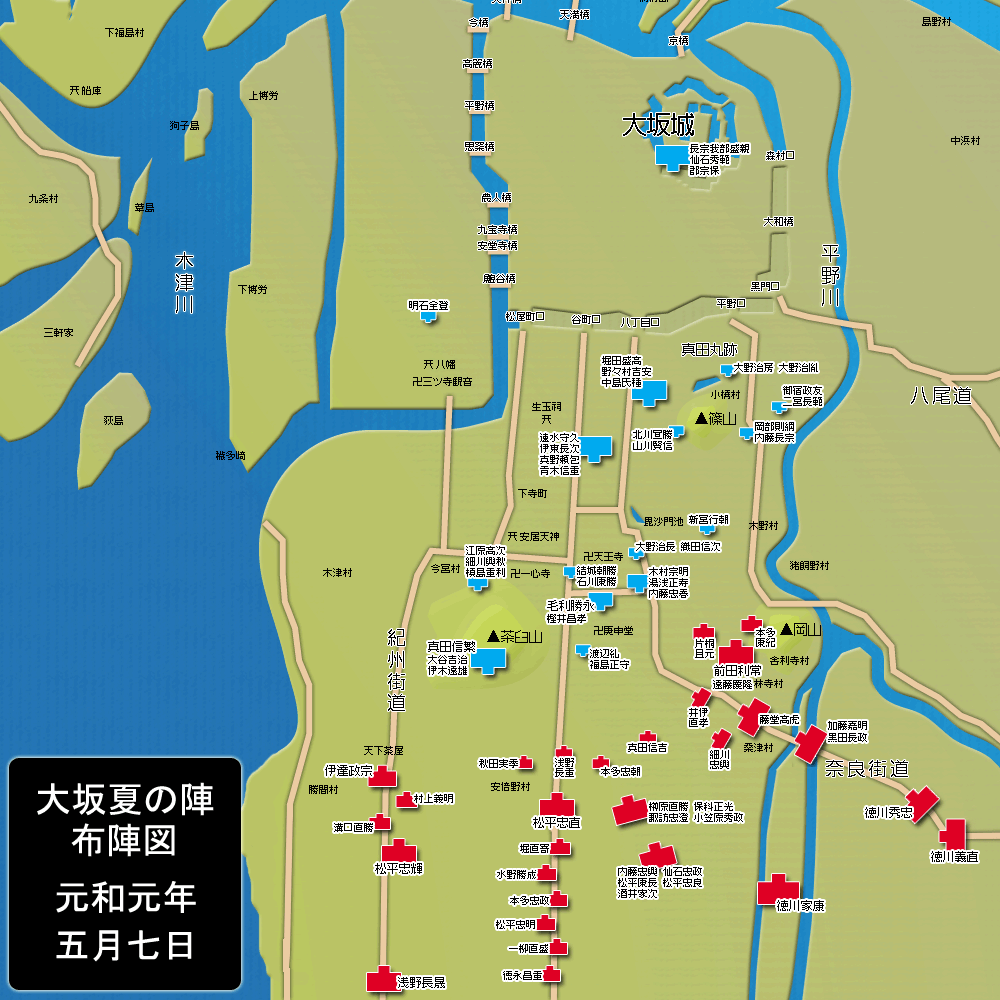
Setup of Battle of Tennōji. June 3, 1615

After another series of Tokugawa victories on the outskirts of Osaka, the summer campaign came to a head at the Battle of Tennōji. Hideyori planned a hammer-and-anvil operation in which 55,000 men would attack the center of the Tokugawa army while a second force, 16,500 men led by Kyōgoku Tadataka, Ishikawa Tadafusa, and Kyōgoku Takatomo, would attack them from the rear. Meanwhile, Ii Naotaka sent his Red Demon ninja unit under the lead of Miura Yo'emon, Shimotani Sanzo, Okuda Kasa'emon, and Saga Kita'emon to aid the Tokugawa's regular soldiers in storming the southern gate of Osaka castle. Another contingent waited in reserve. Ieyasu's army was led by his son, the Shōgun Tokugawa Hidetada, and numbered around 155,000. They moved in four parallel lines, prepared to make flanking maneuvers of their own. Mistakes on both sides almost altered the outcome of the battle, as Hideyori's rōnin split off from the main group, and Hidetada's reserve force moved up without orders from the main force. In the end, Hideyori's commander Sanada Yukimura was killed by Nishio Munetsugu, (Note: Recent theories based on founding has it following that Yukimura was killed after bouts of single combats with Munetsugu with a spear. Munetsugu at first did not recognize Yukimura and cut his head to return to the Tokugawa army camp. The head was only recognized when an acquaintance of the Sanada clan visited the camp and noticed it was the head of Yukimura) destroying the morale of the Toyotomi Army. The smaller force led directly by Hideyori sallied forth from Osaka Castle too late, and was chased right back into the castle by the advancing enemies; there was no time to set up a proper defense of the castle, and it was soon ablaze and pummeled by artillery fire.

The people who were in the castle began to escape. Hidetada knew that his daughter was in the castle, so he sent Ii Naotaka to save her. Senhime managed to escape with her son Toyotomi Kunimatsu (Hideyori's son) accompanied by other women. Kaihime fled with Hideyori's concubine, Oiwa no Kata, and Hideyori's daughter Nāhime. While they retreated, Kaihime personally defended Nāhime from Tokugawa troops. Hideyori and Yodo-dono took refuge in a fireproof warehouse, as much of the castle was in flames. Ōno Harunaga sent Hideyori's wife, Senhime, with his father Hidetada to be forgiven, and to plead for the life of her husband and mother-in-law. Without waiting for answers, Toyotomi Hideyori and Yodo-dono committed seppuku in the flames of Osaka castle, thus ending the Toyotomi dynasty. When the death of the clan leaders was announced, Lady Okurakyo, Lady Aeba, Ono Harunaga, Ono Harufusa and other loyal retainers committed suicide shortly thereafter.

The final major uprising against Tokugawa rule was put to an end, leaving the shogunate unchallenged for approximately 250 years.

==== Theory ====
According to an account by an employee of the Dutch East India Company in Hirado, several daimyō set the castle on fire and attempted to defect to Ieyasu. Hideyori executed them by throwing them off the castle wall but could not extinguish the fire, which then led to his suicide. The account also stated that about 10,000 people perished in the blaze.

== Aftermath ==
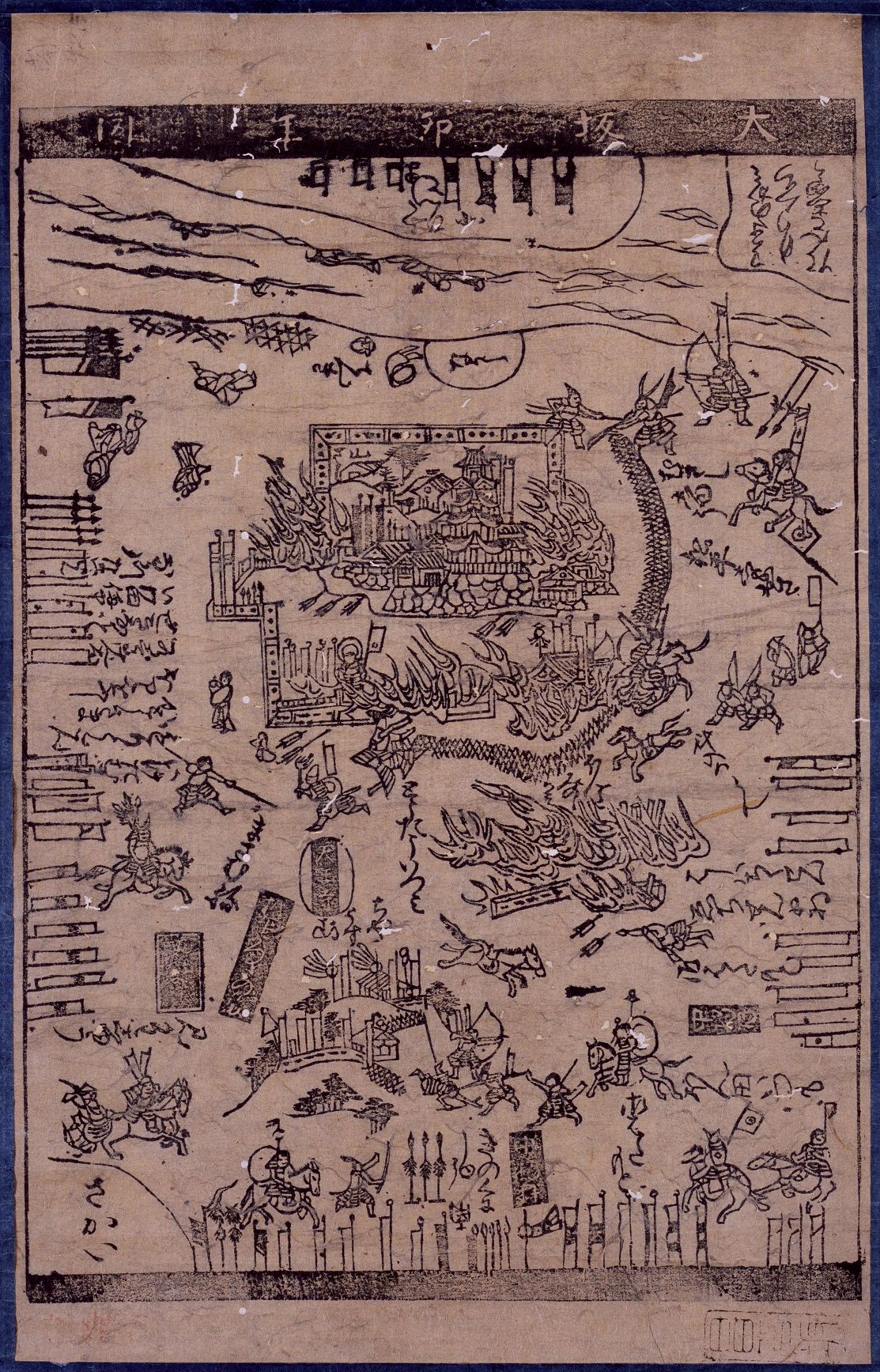
One of the oldest kawaraban newsprints sold during the Edo period, depicting the fall of Osaka Castle

In July of the same year, the Edo Shogunate ordered the Imperial Court to change the era name from Keicho to Genwa, apparently to signify the end of civil war in Japan which started since Onin War.

Furuta Oribe, a daimyo of a fief of 10,000 koku in Minamiyamashiro and Higashiyamato, was ordered to commit seppuku at his home in Fushimi (Fushimi Ward, Kyoto City) on June 11. Although Oribe sided with the Tokugawa side on the outside, but at the same time, Oribe was in league with the Toyotomi side. During the Summer Siege in April, Oribe supported Hideyori and hatched a plan to set fire to Kyoto. Taking advantage of the unrest, he called on the Toyotomi side to march in and kill Ieyasu and Hidetada. Oribe's vassal, Kimura Muneyoshi, conspired with gamblers in Kyoto and Osaka to carry out arson attacks. Oribe's son-in-law, Suzuki Samanosuke, tried to gather ronin to support him. The renga poet Nyogen, ordered by Hideyori to carry Oribe's secret letters and communicate with the Shimazu clan and other feudal lords However, Onjuku Echizen no Kami, a Toyotomi clan member, rushed to Itakura Katsushige and exposed Oribe and his men's plan (there are various theories about who made the report). Katsushige increased his vigilance and threatened to offer a reward to anyone who could provide information on this matter. Shortly afterwards, a suspicious man was caught on a tip-off and revealed that Muneyoshi was the ringleader. Muneyoshi was captured and tortured, but never mentioned Oribe's name. Meanwhile, one of the ringleaders, Samanosuke, was killed by Toda Hachiroemon. At that time, Samanosuke's servant dropped the box. When the box was delivered to Katsushige, a secret letter detailing the plot and a palindrome encouraging the uprising were discovered inside. Katsushige immediately reported the matter to Ieyasu and Hidetada, and Oribe was taken into custody. After his death, Oribe's children who were also implicated also committed suicide.

After the war, there were some assessment investigation about how well the Tokugawa army Commanders performed. The Maeda clan force were noted for their poor performance as completely defeated by Sanada Yukimura--According to "Inquiry into Suspicious Matters After the Winter Campaign of Osaka" (Kokuji Zassho, Vol. 1). This historical document which is a compilation of the results of interviews and investigations into the actual circumstances of the defeat in the Winter Siege of Osaka, and as stated at the end, it called for reports to be made without favoritism or partiality, even if the person in question was a relative or acquaintance. Supporting this fact, historical documents such as the "Suga Family Records," "Nagaji Family Records," and "Nishio Hayato Nikusho Family Records" describe how Maeda retainers competed with each other to storm into Sanadamaru.

Hideyori's son Toyotomi Kunimatsu, aged eight, was captured by the Tokugawa forces and beheaded in Kyoto. According to legend, before his beheading, little Kunimatsu bravely blamed Ieyasu for his betrayal and brutality against the Toyotomi clan. Nāhime, daughter of Hideyori, was not sentenced to death. Ohatsu and Senhime were able to save Nāhime's life and adopted her; she later became a nun at Kamakura's Tōkei-ji. Hideyoshi's grave, along with Kyoto's Toyokuni Shrine, were destroyed subsequently during the Tokugawa shogunate. Chōsokabe Morichika was beheaded on May 11. There are also records of pillaging and mass rapes by Tokugawa forces at the closing of the siege.

The bakufu obtained 650,000 koku at Osaka and started rebuilding Osaka Castle. Osaka was then made a han (feudal domain), and given to Matsudaira Tadayoshi. In 1619, however, the shogunate replaced Osaka Domain with Osaka Jodai, placed under the command of a bugyō who served the shogunate directly; like many of Japan's other major cities, Osaka was for the remainder of the Edo period not part of a han under the control of a daimyō. A few daimyō including Naitō Nobumasa (Takatsuki Castle, Settsu Province 20,000 koku) and Mizuno Katsushige (Yamato Koriyama, Yamato Province 60,000 koku) moved to Osaka.

After the fall of the castle, the shogunate announced laws including ikkoku ichijō (一国一城) (one province can contain only one castle) and Bukeshohatto (or called Law of Buke, which limits each daimyō to own only one castle and obey the castle restrictions). The shogunate's permission had to be obtained prior to any castle construction or repair from then on. Many castles were also forced to be destroyed as a result of compliance with this law.

In 1618, Murayama Tōan was executed by the Shogunate due to the suspicion of colluding with the Osaka faction during the Siege of Osaka. Tōan had one of his sons accompany a ronin to smuggle gunpowder and ammunition into Osaka Castle, and that when his third son, Francisco Toan, was exiled, he secretly smuggled a Catholic Dominican priest at Takahoko Island outside Nagasaki Port.

== In popular culture ==
The siege is the subject of Hiroshi Inagaki's historical drama "Ōsaka-jō monogatari" (engl. The Tale of Osaka Castle, UK; some other English titles: "Daredevil in the Castle", "Devil in the Castle", "Osaka Castle Story") (1961) with Toshiro Mifune in the leading role. It is also the backdrop for Tai Kato's musical film Brave Records of the Sanada Clan (1963).

The fall of Osaka is (for most of the characters) the final level in the Samurai Warriors series, also serving as the climax of Hattori Hanzō's, Ieyasu's and Yukimura's stories. Called the "Osaka Campaign", it compiles all the battles of the Winter and Summer Campaigns. In the computer game Shadow Tactics: Blades of the Shogun, the siege of Osaka castle is the setting of the first (and demo) mission.

The siege of Osaka also is the main setting for the tv show, Samurai Rabbit: The Usagi Chronicles.

The protagonist, Tsugumo Hanshirō, of the film Harakiri, mentions his status as a veteran of the siege of Osaka Castle.

The events of the siege and its fallout form the backstory for the 1974 Toei TV series Unmeitōge.

A manga titled Issak is about a man who survived a betrayal of his own fellow student, who fled after the fall of the castle. Then, he went on to Europe, just to find and kill him in midst of Thirty Years War as a mercenary of the Palatinate, while his nemesis, a mercenary for the Spanish Empire.

The siege campaign serves as the setting for the video game Nioh's final two DLC. The game's second DLC, "Defiant Hope", is set during the Winter campaign whereas the third DLC, "Bloodshed's End", is set during the Summer campaign up through the fall of Osaka castle and the beginning of the Genna Era.

== See also ==
- Winter Campaign (大坂冬の陣 Osaka Fuyu no Jin)
  - Battle of Imafuku
  - Battle of Shigino
  - Battle of Kizugawa
  - Battle of Noda-Fukushima
  - Siege of Sanada-maru
- Summer Campaign (大坂夏の陣 Osaka Natsu no Jin)
  - Battle of Kashii
  - Battle of Dōmyōji
  - Battle of Yao
  - Battle of Wakae
  - Battle of Tennōji

== Appendix ==
=== Bibliography ===
- Davis, Paul K. (2003). Besieged: 100 Great Sieges from Jericho to Sarajevo. New York: Oxford University Press. ISBN 978-0-19-521930-2.
- De Lange, William (2022). The Siege of Osaka Castle: The Winter and Summer Campaigns. Groningen: Toyo Press. ISBN 978-9-49-272238-6.
- Gekitō Ōsaka no jin : Saidai saigo no sengoku kassen (激闘大坂の陣 : 最大最後の戦国合戦) [The Fierce Battle of Osaka: The Final and Greatest Battle of the Sengoku Period] (in Japanese). Tokyo: Gakken. 2000. ISBN 978-4-05-602236-0. OCLC 676058212.
- Senkyō zuroku Ōsaka no jin : Nagaki senran no yo ni shūshifu o utta nihon shijō saidai kibo no kōjōsen (戦況図錄大坂の陣 : 永き戦乱の世に終止符を打った日本史上最大規模の攻城戦) [Battlefield Record: The Battle of Osaka: The largest siege in Japanese history that put an end to a long period of war] (in Japanese). Tokyo: Shin Jinbutsu Ōraisha. 2003. ISBN 978-4-404-03056-6. OCLC 673555276.
- Tatsuo, Fujita (2018). Tōdō Takatora ron : shoki hanseishi no kenkyū (藤堂高虎論 : 初期藩政史の研究) [On Todo Takatora: A study of the early history of feudal domain politics] (in Japanese). Hanawa Shobo. ISBN 978-4-8273-1296-6. OCLC 1079060722.
- Turnbull, Stephen (2012). Osaka 1615: The last battle of the samurai. London: Bloomsbury Publishing. ISBN 978-1-78200-009-9.
- Turnbull, Stephen (2012). Ninja AD 1460–1650. London: Bloomsbury Publishing. ISBN 978-1-78200-256-7.
- Mitsunari, Junji (2016). Mōri Terumoto : Saigoku no gi makaseokaru no yoshi sōrō (毛利輝元 : 西国の儀任せ置かるの由候) [Terumoto Mori: It is said that the ceremonies of the Western provinces are left to their discretion]. Minerva Japanese Biography Selection (in Japanese). Kyoto: Minerva Publishing. ISBN 978-4623076895. OCLC 949847873.
- Watanabe, Yosuke (1999). Mōri terumoto kyō den (毛利輝元卿伝) [The Life of Lord Mori] (in Japanese). Tokuyama: Matsuno Shoden. OCLC 676064335.（first published in 1944）
