= Battle of Imafuku =

1600 battle

- Part of the post-Sengoku period
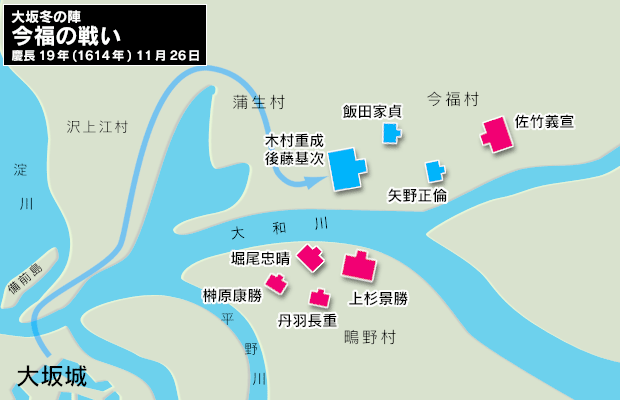
- Battle of Imafuku. Satake is the red unit to the right; Tokugawa reinforcements are on the south bank.
Date	late November 1614
Location	Imafuku, northeast of Osaka Castle, Japan 34°41′54″N 135°32′57″E
Result	Tokugawa victory

Belligerents
Tokugawa shogunate	Toyotomi clan

Commanders and leaders
Satake Yoshinobu; Uesugi Kagekatsu	Kimura Shigenari; Gotō Mototsugu

Strength
1,500+ reinforcements	600+ reinforcements

Casualties and losses
Unknown	500–600
- Location within Japan

The Battle of Imafuku (今福の戦い, Imafuku no tatakai) was fought on November 26th, 1614 between the forces of Tokugawa Ieyasu and the Toyotomi clan. This battle was one of the first of the series of battles fought near Osaka over the course of two years. The village of Imafuku stood on the northeast approach to Osaka, and so Tokugawa Ieyasu sent 1,500 men under the command of Satake Yoshinobu to secure the site for a fort. They faced off against 600 men loyal to the Toyotomi "Western Army," under two generals named Iida and Masatomo Yano.

After Satake routed the defenders from the village and killed Iida and Yano, reinforcements from the Western Army arrived. Kimura Shigenari and Gotō Mototsugu led a charge, incurring major casualties on the Eastern force and forcing Satake to call a withdrawal.

However, in the end, the Western forces were forced back once more after Uesugi Kagekatsu arrived with reinforcements for Satake's men. Satake then managed to finally get a hold on the village.
