= Gō (TV series) =

2011 taiga drama about the daughters of daimyō Azai Nagamasa

- Genre: Historical; Jidaigeki
- Written by: Kumiko Tabuchi
- Starring: Juri Ueno; Rie Miyazawa; Asami Mizukawa; Etsushi Toyokawa; Osamu Mukai; Honami Suzuki; Yasuo Daichi; Takehiro Hira; Akira; Motoya Izumi; Masato Hagiwara; Mimura; Shinji Takeda; Takumi Saito; Minori Terada; Sawa Suzuki; Toshio Shiba; Masao Kusakari; Yasuko Tomita; Mariko Kaga; Tomoko Naraoka; Gorō Kishitani; Masachika Ichimura; Shinobu Otake; Kōji Ishizaka; Kin'ya Kitaōji
- Narrated by: Honami Suzuki
- Opening theme: "Gō: Princesses of Sengoku (Main Theme)" (「江〜姫たちの戦国〜 (メインテーマ)」)
- Composer: Ryō Yoshimata
- Country of origin: Japan
- Original language: Japanese
- No. of episodes: 46

Production
- Executive producers: Yōtarō Yashiki; Ken Sakurai
- Producer: Tarō Ōsugi
- Running time: 45–73 minutes

Original release
- Network: NHK
- Release: January 9 – November 27, 2011

Gō: Himetachi no Sengoku (江〜姫たちの戦国〜, lit. "Gō: The princesses' Sengoku) is a 2011 Japanese historical drama television series and the 50th NHK taiga drama. It was written for television by Kumiko Tabuchi, based on her own novel of the same name. The drama stars Juri Ueno in the title role, with Rie Miyazawa and Asami Mizukawa as Cha-cha and Hatsu respectively, the sisters of Gō.

The series was critically panned by viewers for being "dark" and "boring", and it received two Shinchō Razzie Awards for Worst TV Series and Worst Actress (Juri Ueno).

== Plot ==
At the center of a network of powerful warriors, the title character is Oeyo, also known as Ogō. The series carries the subtitle Himetachi no Sengoku (姫たちの戦国), spotlighting the ladies of the Sengoku period. Gō was a daughter of Oichi, the sister of Oda Nobunaga. Oichi was the wife of Sengoku daimyō Azai Nagamasa. The couple had three daughters. The first, Yodo-dono, became the second wife of Toyotomi Hideyoshi and mother of his successor Hideyori. The second, Ohatsu, married another Sengoku daimyo, Kyōgoku Takatsugu.

The third daughter was Gō. She was the first wife of Saji Kazunari. However, he joined forces with Tokugawa Ieyasu in the Battle of Komaki and Nagakute, and opponent Toyotomi Hideyoshi forced them to divorce. Her second husband, Toyotomi Hidekatsu, was a nephew of Hideyoshi, but died in the Japanese invasions of Korea. Finally, Gō married Tokugawa Hidetada, the second Tokugawa shogun, and gave birth to his successor Iemitsu as well as his brother Tadanaga. Her two daughters were Senhime, who married Hideyori, and Masako (Kazuko), consort of Emperor Go-Mizunoo. Moreover, her granddaughter ascended the throne as Empress Meishō.

== Cast ==
=== Principal ===
- Juri Ueno as Gō, youngest daughter of Azai Nagamasa, mother of Iemitsu
- Rie Miyazawa as Cha-cha, oldest daughter of Azai Nagamasa
- Asami Mizukawa as Hatsu, older sister of Gō

=== Azai Family ===
- Mana Ashida as young Cha-cha
- Honami Suzuki as Ichi, mother of Gō
- Saburō Tokitō as Azai Nagamasa, father of Gō
- Minori Terada as Azai Hisamasa, father of Azai Nagamasa, grandfather of Go
- Masayuki Yui as Akao Kiyotsuna

=== Oda Family ===
- Etsushi Toyokawa as Oda Nobunaga, brother of Ichi, uncle of Gō
- Ayumi Tanida as Oda Nobutada, eldest son of Oda Nobunaga
- Yūta Yamazaki as Oda Nobukatsu, second son of Oda Nobunaga
- Yūta Kanai as Oda Nobutaka, third son of Oda Nobunaga
- Takashi Kobayashi as Oda Nobukane, uncle of Gō

=== Vassal of Oda Family ===
- Yasuo Daichi as Shibata Katsuie
- Keisaku Wada as Maeda Toshiie
  - Shun Ōide as Old Toshiie
- Takehiro Hira as Saji Kazunari, cousin of three sisters
- Yoshiharu Takeda as Ikeda Tsuneoki
- Jundai Yamada as Sakuma Morimasa
- Kōji Seto as Mori Ranmaru
- Shōta Sometani as Mori Bōmaru
- Shōgo Sakamoto as Mori Rikimaru

=== Akechi Family ===
- Masachika Ichimura as Akechi Mitsuhide, a general under Oda Nobunaga
- Mimura as Hosokawa Gracia, a daughter of Akechi Mitsuhide
- Yū Kamio as Saitō Toshimitsu

=== Toyotomi Family ===
- Gorō Kishitani as Toyotomi Hideyoshi, vassal of Oda Nobunaga
- Shinobu Otake as One, legal wife of Toyotomi Hideyoshi
- Tomoko Naraoka as Naka, mother of Toyotomi Hideyoshi
- Yukiya Kitamura as Toyotomi Hidetsugu, a nephew and retainer of Toyotomi Hideyoshi
- Yoshihiko Hakamada as Hashiba Hidenaga, Toyotomi Hidenaga
- Taiga as Toyotomi Hideyori
- Shioli Kutsuna as Senhime
  - Mana Ashida as young Senhime
- Sawa Suzuki as Kyōgoku Tatsuko

=== Vassal of Toyotomi Family ===
- Masato Hagiwara as Ishida Mitsunari
- Toshio Shiba as Kuroda Kanbei
- Shinji Takeda as Ōno Harunaga

=== Tokugawa Family ===
- Kin'ya Kitaōji as Tokugawa Ieyasu, father of Tokugawa Hidetada
- Osamu Mukai as Tokugawa Hidetada, third son of Tokugawa Ieyasu
- Kayo Asano as Lady Tsukiyama
- Shōgo Kimura as Tokugawa Nobuyasu, eldest son of Tokugawa Ieyasu
- Yasuko Tomita as Fuku
- Naoto Kinosaki as Takechiyo
- Tomoyuki Imagawa as Kunimatsu
- Kaito Kobayashi as Hoshina Kōmatsu
- Mone Kamishiraishi as Masa

=== Vassal of Tokugawa Family ===
- Masao Kusakari as Honda Masanobu
- Shunsuke Kariya as Honda Tadakatsu
- Ken'ichi Sakuragi as Sakai Tadatsugu

=== Others ===
- Motoya Izumi as Ashikaga Yoshiaki, the 15th shogun of the Ashikaga shogunate
- Jin Nakayama as Asakura Yoshikage
- Kōji Ishizaka as Sen no Rikyū, famous tea masters
- Manabu Hamada as Sanada Yukimura
- Tatsumi Fujinami as Sanada Masayuki
- Takumi Saito as Kyōgoku Takatsugu
- Akira Hamada as Mōri Terumoto
- Koji Shimizu as Hōjō Ujimasa
- Nobuyoshi Hisamatsu as Takeda Katsuyori

== Production ==
Gō was announced as the 50th taiga drama by the NHK on June 17, 2009, to be based on the novel of the same name by Kumiko Tabuchi, who is also the writer for the drama. Tabuchi, composer Ryō Yoshimata, and actress Tomoko Naraoka all previously worked on the 47th taiga drama Atsuhime in 2008. With the success of Atsuhime, Tabuchi was asked in the middle of its run if she can write a series about Gō and her sisters, to which she agreed to. Though she began to write the teleplays for Gō in 2008, she would decide to complete the novel first before continuing to write the scripts.

The usual taiga drama production would first have one-third of the expected number of scripts finished before shooting begins. Afterwards, audience reception is taken into account as the rest of the series is written.

== Production credits ==
- Sword fight arranger - Kunishirō Hayashi

== Episode list ==
The first and last episodes are 73 minutes long. The rest are 45 minutes long without commercials.

| Episode | Title | Directed by | Travelogue | Original airdate | Rating |
|---|---|---|---|---|---|
| 1 | "Kokoku no hime" (湖国の姫, Princess of Lake Country) | Masaya Iseda | Nagahama, Shiga about Odani Castle | January 9, 2011 | 21.7% |
| 2 | "Chichi no kataki" (父の仇, Enemy of Father) | Masaya Iseda | Tsu, Mie about Ise-Ueno Castle | January 16, 2011 | 22.1% |
| 3 | "Nobunaga no himitsu" (信長の秘密, The Secret of Nobunaga) | Masaya Iseda | Nagahama, Shiga about Chikubu Island | January 23, 2011 | 22.6% |
| 4 | "Honnō-ji e" (本能寺へ, Going to Honnō-ji) | Masaya Iseda | Kyoto about Sōken'in; Nara, Nara about Shōsōin | January 30, 2011 | 21.5% |
| 5 | "Honnō-ji no hen" (本能寺の変, The Incident at Honnō-ji) | Masaya Iseda | Kyoto about Honnō-ji | February 6, 2011 | 22.0% |
| 6 | "Mitsuhide no tenka" (光秀の天下, Glory of Mitsuhide) | Masaya Iseda | Ōtsu, Shiga about Saikyō-ji | February 13, 2011 | 19.6% |
| 7 | "Haha no saikon" (母の再婚, Remarriage of Mother) | Yūsuke Noda | Kiyosu, Aichi about Kiyosu Castle | February 20, 2011 | 18.5% |
| 8 | "Hajimete no chichi" (初めての父, The First Father) | Yūsuke Noda | Fukui, Fukui about Fukui Castle | February 27, 2011 | 20.9% |
| 9 | "Gifu no namida" (義父の涙, Tears of Stepfather) | Yūsuke Noda | Nagahama, Shiga about Shizugatake-kosenjō | March 6, 2011 | 20.0% |
| 10 | "Wakare" (わかれ, Farewell) | Yūsuke Noda | Fukui, Fukui about Kitanoshō-Seikōji | March 20, 2011 | 16.9% |
| 11 | "Saru no hitojichi" (猿の人質, The Hostage of Saru) | Masaya Iseda | Tamaki, Mie about Tamaru Castle | March 27, 2011 | 15.7% |
| 12 | "Cha-cha no hanran" (茶々の反乱, The Rebellion of Cha-cha) | Masaya Iseda | Sakai, Osaka about a residence of Sen no Rikyū | April 3, 2011 | 17.1% |
| 13 | "Hanayome no ketsui" (花嫁の決意, The Determination of Bride) | Yūsuke Noda | Tokoname, Aichi about Ōno Castle | April 10, 2011 | 16.6% |
| 14 | "Rien seyo" (離縁せよ, The Instruction of Dissolution) | Yūsuke Noda | Aisai, Aichi about Sanri no watashi | April 17, 2011 | 19.2% |
| 15 | "Saru no shōtai" (猿の正体, The Identity of Saru) | Masaya Iseda | Osaka about Osaka Castle | April 24, 2011 | 18.0% |
| 16 | "Kanpaku Hideyoshi" (関白秀吉, Kanpaku Hideyoshi) | Masaya Iseda | Nagaokakyō, Kyoto about Shōryūji Castle | May 1, 2011 | 15.9% |
| 17 | "Ieyasu no hanayome" (家康の花嫁, The Bride of Ieyasu) | Tsutomu Yoshida | Hamamatsu about Hamamatsu Castle | May 8, 2011 | 20.7% |
| 18 | "Koishikute" (恋しくて, Loving) | Tsutomu Yoshida | Takashima, Shiga about Ōmizo Castle | May 15, 2011 | 18.1% |
| 19 | "Hatsu no endan" (初の縁談, The First Engagement) | Yūsuke Noda | Kyoto about Jurakudai | May 22, 2011 | 17.3% |
| 20 | "Cha-cha no koi" (茶々の恋, Cha-cha's Love) | Yūsuke Noda | Kyoto about Kitano Tenman-gū | May 29, 2011 | 19.0% |
| 21 | "Toyotomi no tsuma" (豊臣の妻, Toyotomi's Wife) | Masaya Iseda | Kyoto about Myōkyōji | June 5, 2011 | 17.6% |
| 22 | "Fubo no shōzō" (父母の肖像, The Portrait of Parents) | Tadashi Tanaka | Kōya, Wakayama about Jimyōin | June 12, 2011 | 18.3% |
| 23 | "Hitojichi, Hidetada" (人質秀忠, The Hostage, Hidetada) | Masaya Iseda | Odawara, Kanagawa about Odawara Castle | June 19, 2011 | 18.0% |
| 24 | "Rikyū, Seppuku" (利休切腹, Seppuku of Rikyū) | Tadashi Tanaka | Yamatokōriyama, Nara about Kōriyama Castle | June 26, 2011 | 18.1% |
| 25 | "Ai no arashi" (愛の嵐, Storm of Love) | Yūsuke Noda | Kyoto about Daitoku-ji | July 3, 2011 | 16.3% |
| 26 | "Haha ni naru toki" (母になる時, Time to Become a Mother) | Yūsuke Noda | Gifu, Gifu about Gifu Castle(Mount Kinka Ropeway) | July 10, 2011 | 16.2% |
| 27 | "Hidekatsu no yuigon" (秀勝の遺言, Hidekatsu's Will) | Masaya Iseda | Ōmihachiman, Shiga about Hachiman'yama Castle | July 17, 2011 | 15.3% |
| 28 | "Hidetada ni totsuge" (秀忠に嫁げ, The Marriage of Hidetada) | Masaya Iseda | Kyoto, Kyoto about Suizenji | July 24, 2011 | 18.9% |
| 29 | "Saiaku no otto" (最悪の夫, The Worst Husband) | Tadashi Tanaka | Hamamatsu, Shizuoka about the well where Hidekatsu was born | July 31, 2011 | 17.4% |
| 30 | "Itoshiki hito yo" (愛しき人よ, Beloved Person) | Yūsuke Noda | Kyoto, Kyoto about Fushimi Castle ruins | August 7, 2011 | 17.6% |
| 31 | "Hideyoshi shisu" (秀吉死す, Hideyoshi's Death) | Takuya Shimizu | Kyoto, Kyoto about Daigoji temple | August 14, 2011 | 13.1% |
| 32 | "Edo no oni" (江戸の鬼, The Devil of Edo) | Masaya Iseda | Chiyoda, Tokyo about Kanda Shrine | August 21, 2011 | 15.4% |
| 33 | "Tokugawa no yome" (徳川の嫁, The Wife of Tokugawa) | Tadashi Tanaka | Hikone, Shiga about Wakayama Castle | August 28, 2011 | 15.6% |
| 34 | "Hime no jūjika" (姫の十字架, The Crucifix of the Princess) | Yūsuke Noda | Osaka, Osaka about Ecchūi | September 4, 2011 | 17.8% |
| 35 | "Maboroshi no sekigahara" (幻の関ヶ原; The Phantom of Sekigahara) | Masaya Iseda | Ōtsu, Shiga about Ōtsu Castle | September 11, 2011 | 15.4% |
| 36 | "Otoko no kakugo" (男の覚悟, Preparedness for a Man) | Takuya Shimizu | Sekigahara, Gifu about Sekigahara | September 18, 2011 | 15.8% |
| 37 | "Senhime no konrei" (千姫の婚礼, The Marriage of Senhime) | Masaya Iseda | Kyoto, Kyoto about Gogōnomiya shrine | September 25, 2011 | 16.4% |
| 38 | "Saikyō no onba" (最強の乳母, The Strongest Nanny) | Yūsuke Noda | Nara, Nara about Obitoke temple | October 2, 2011 | 15.9% |
| 39 | "Unmei no taimen" (運命の対面, The Faceoff of Fate) | Takuya Shimizu | Obama, Fukui about Jōkō temple | October 9, 2011 | 15.7% |
| 40 | "Ieyasu no shūnen" (家康の執念, Ieyasu's Obsession) | Masaya Iseda | Kawagoe, Saitama about Kita-in | October 16, 2011 | 15.2% |
| 41 | "Shimai gekitotsu!" (姉妹激突！, Sisters Clash) | Masaya Iseda | Kyoto about Hōkō-ji | October 23, 2011 | 17.0% |
| 42 | "Ōsaka fuyu no jin" (大坂冬の陣, Ōsaka Winter Campaign) | Yūsuke Noda | Osaka about Okachiyama Mound | October 30, 2011 | 16.1% |
| 43 | "Yodo, Chiru" (淀、散る, The Demise of Yodo) | Yūsuke Noda | Osaka about Ikukunitama Shrine | November 6, 2011 | 16.1% |
| 44 | "Edo-jō Sōran" (江戸城騒乱, The Mayhem at Edo Castle) | Tomohiro Kuwano | Chiyoda, Tokyo about Edo Castle | November 13, 2011 | 15.6% |
| 45 | "Musuko yo" (息子よ, My son) | Masaya Iseda | Shizuoka City about Kunōzan Tōshō-gū | November 20, 2011 | 15.6% |
| 46 | "Kibō" (希望, Hope) | Masaya Iseda | Minato, Tokyo | November 27, 2011 | 19.1% |
Average rating 17.7% - Rating is based on Japanese Video Research (Kantō region).

== Reception ==
Though Gō was rigorous in trying to achieve an accurate depiction of Japanese history, it was reported to have been negatively received by viewers, who complained about the series being "dark" and "boring".

== Soundtrack ==
- NHK Taiga Drama Gō: Hime-tachi no Sengoku, Original Soundtrack (February 16, 2010)

== Bibliography ==
Official guide

- NHK Taiga Drama Story Gō First Volume ISBN 978-4-14-923356-7 (December 18, 2010)
- NHK Taiga Drama Story Gō Latter Volume ISBN 978-4-14-923357-4 (May 29, 2011)
- NHK Taiga Drama, Historical Handbook, Gō ISBN 978-4-14-910766-0 (December 21, 2010)

Novel

- Gō First Volume ISBN 978-4-14-005570-0 (October 31, 2009)
- Gō Last Volume ISBN 978-4-14-005571-7 (January 29, 2010)
- Gō, New Edition, First Volume ISBN 978-4-14-005594-6 (November 12, 2010)
- Gō, New Edition, Latter Volume ISBN 978-4-14-005595-3 (November 12, 2010)
- Gō, New Edition, Last Volume ISBN 978-4-14-005596-0 (November 12, 2010)

Comic

- Gō 1 ISBN 978-4-06-365635-0 (December 20, 2010)
- Gō 2 ISBN 978-4-06-376045-3 (April 13, 2011)

== Accolades ==
| Year | Award | Category | Nominee | Result |
|---|---|---|---|---|
| 2011 | Shinchō Razzie Awards | Worst TV Series | Gō | Won |
| 2011 | Shinchō Razzie Awards | Worst Actress | Juri Ueno | Won |
