= Kyōgoku Tatsuko =

Toyotomi Hideyoshi's concubine

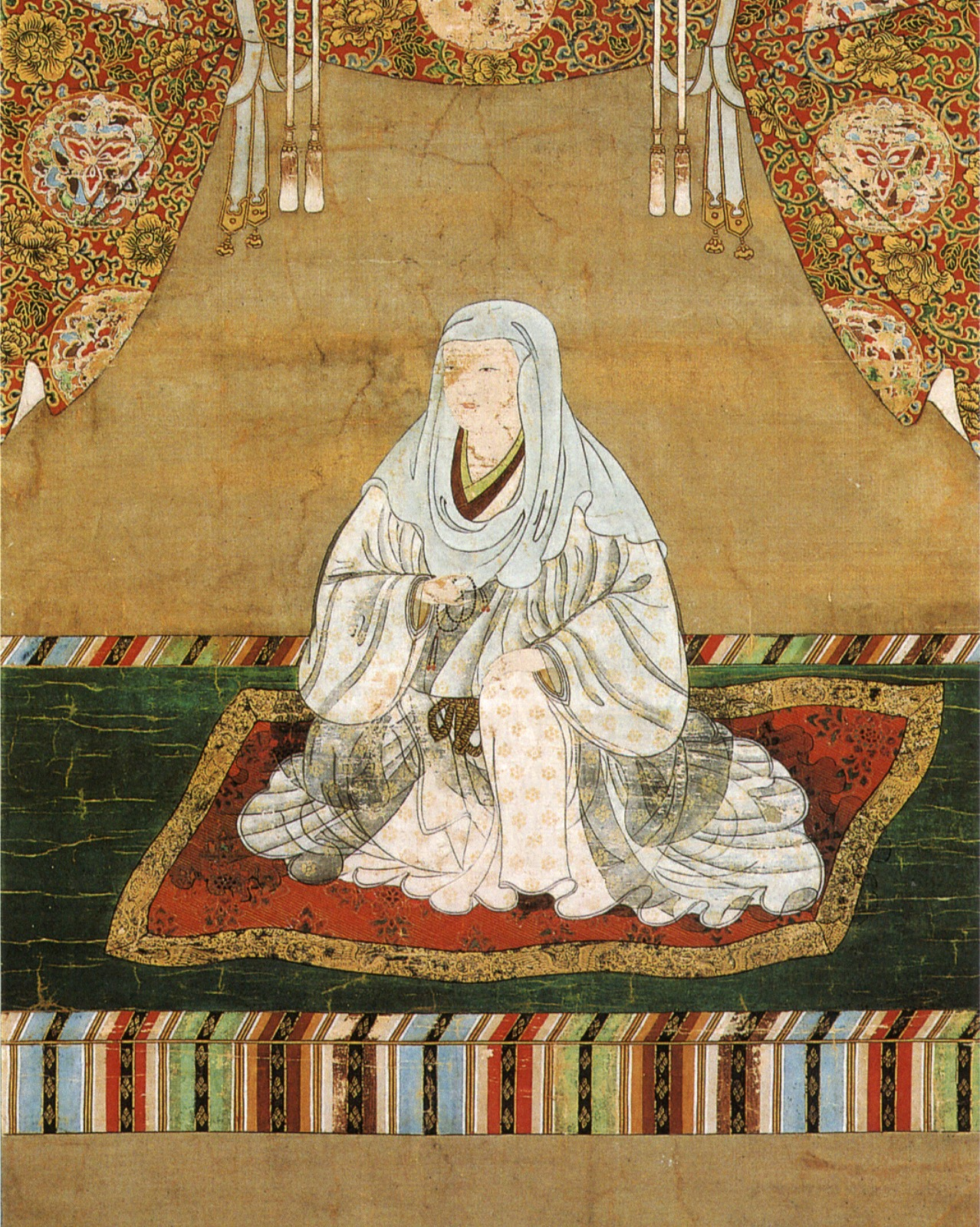
Lady Matsunomaru

Kyōgoku Tatsuko (京極竜子) (January 11, 1561 – October 22, 1634) was a Japanese woman who lived from the Sengoku period to the early Edo period. She was the sister of Kyōgoku Takatsugu. She was first the wife of Wakasa daimyō Takeda Motoaki, but after his death she became Toyotomi Hideyoshi's concubine. Her cousin, Chacha, was also a concubine and both of them were best friends. Hideyoshi granted her the name Lady Matsunomaru (松の丸殿).

After Hideyoshi's death she became a nun under the name Juhō-in (寿芳院). She also moved to Ōtsu Castle, which was under the command of her brother, in Ōmi Province, and she was there when the siege of Ōtsu occurred.

== Biography ==
Kyogoku Tatsuko, also known as Jikko-in (寿芳院) was born into the prestigious Kyoto-based Kyogoku family, with her father being Kyogoku Takayoshi and her mother, the daughter of Azai Hisamasa, being named Kyogoku Maria. She had siblings as well, including her brother, Kyogoku Takatsugu (some sources suggest he might have been her cousin), and her younger brother, Kyogoku Takachika. She was related to Azai Nagamasa, her uncle, and was a cousin to the Azai sisters Yodo-dono, Ohatsu, and Oeyo.

Kyogoku Tatsuko's lineage traced back to the main branch of the Kyogoku clan, who were originally the lords of the Hokuriku region in Omi Province. Due to this illustrious heritage, she could claim to be from a more distinguished family than Yodo-dono, who was known for her marriage to Toyotomi Hideyoshi and was of lower birth.

=== Life journey ===
In her youth, Kyogoku Tatsuko married Takeda Motoaki, a local guardian in Wakasa Province. Together, they had two sons and one daughter. After her husband Motoaki returned from Echizen Province, where he had been stationed, he was granted control over the 3,000-koku territory of Kozukuri Castle in Omi Province by Oda Nobunaga. Kyogoku Tatsuko joined her husband in the town of Ishiyama in Omi Province.

However, following the Incident at Honnoji, her husband Motoaki, aiming to secure control over all of Wakasa Province, aligned himself with Akechi Mitsuhide, leading to a confrontation with the allied forces of Niwa Nagahide and Hashiba Hideyoshi (later Toyotomi Hideyoshi). Motoaki was defeated and killed by these forces. Kyogoku Tatsuko, hailing from the Kyogoku clan, a former ruling family in Omi Province, was captured and subsequently became one of Hideyoshi's concubines.

Throughout her time as Hideyoshi's concubine, Kyogoku Tatsuko accompanied him to various locations, including Odawara Castle and Nagoya Castle. She was allowed to use the third best palanquin during the cherry blossom viewing party at Daigo, and these facts indicate that she was one of Hideyoshi's favorite concubines.

A portrait of Kyogoku Tatsuko has been preserved at Seigan-ji Temple in Kyoto, depicting her in her forties, highlighting her exceptional beauty.

=== Later life ===
Following Hideyoshi's passing, Kyogoku Tatsuko sought refuge at Otsu Castle, where her brother Kyogoku Takatsugu resided. When Otsu Castle came under attack by the Osaka forces prior to the Battle of Sekigahara in 1600, records from the Chikushi Kobunsho mention Kyogoku Tatsuko's presence in the inner citadel.

After the battle, she took religious vows and assumed the name Jikko-in, residing at Saiho-in Temple in the Western Dojo-in Monastery. In August of the ninth year of the Keicho era (1604), she visited Toyokuni Shrine along with Lady Takadai-nyo Sugihara (杉原氏) and Goho-hime. She requested a special prayer service from the miko (巫女) of Ohara during the Bon festival.

Tatsuko often sent presents to Osaka Castle and visited the castle to see Toyotomi Hideyori. According to "Shunkyuki," even after Hideyoshi's death, she continued to have friendly relationships with Kodai-in and Yodo-dono as a member of the Toyotomi family. A letter written on July 8 of the same year from Myoshin-ji Temple in Kyoto reveals that Toyotomi Hideyori sent a letter to the Matsunomaru Palace (松の丸殿) as part of Bon festival greetings, acknowledging Kyogoku Tatsuko's forthcoming visit to Osaka Castle. This visit during the Keicho era, when Matsunomaru Palace visited Osaka Castle to inquire after Hideyori's well-being, is well-documented.

After the siege of Osaka in the summer, Kyogoku Tatsuko protected a lady-in-waiting named Kiku, who was a maid of Yodo-dono, and received the body of Kunimatsu, the son of Hideyori, who had been executed at Rokujogawara. She buried Kunimatsu at Seigan-ji Temple in Kyoto.

On September 1, 1634, Kyogoku Tatsuko died at her residence in Nishi Dojo-in, Kyoto, and was posthumously named Jikko-in Don Gekko Sekihisa Daizenjo-ni. Her final resting place was initially at Seigan-ji Temple in Kyoto, but her current tomb is located at Toyokuni Shrine.

== Sources ==
- Kuwata Tadachika, "Research on Toyotomi Hideyoshi," Kawade Shobo Publishers, 1975.
- Watanabe Seyu, "The Private Life of Toyotomi Taiko," Kodansha, 1980 (Originally published by Sohensha in 1939).
