= Senhime =

Eldest daughter of Japanese samurai, daimyo and shogun Tokugawa Hidetada (1597–1666)

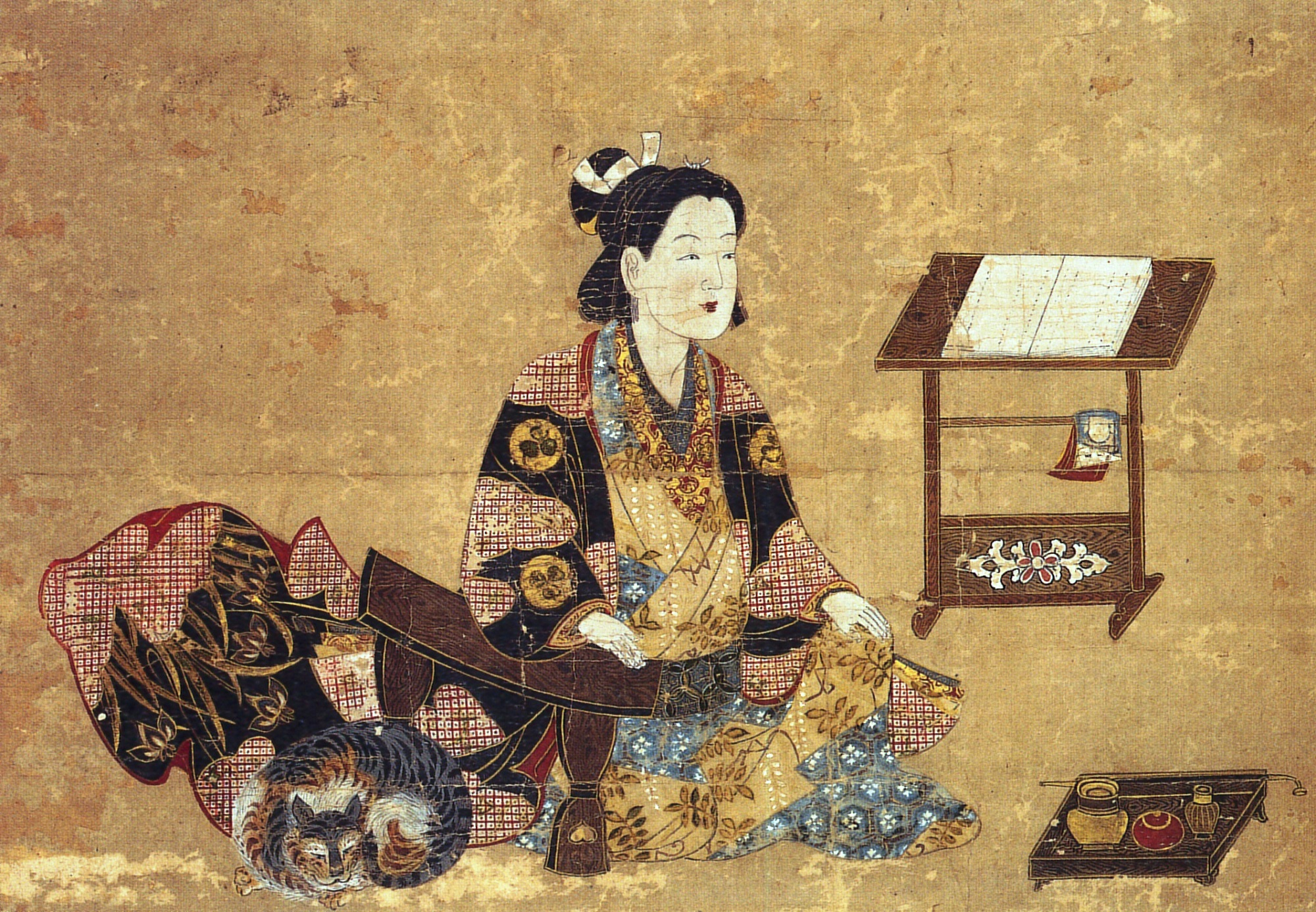
Portrait of Senhime

Senhime (千姫; Japanese pronunciation: [seɰ̃.çi.me], 26 May (Note: 11 April in the old calendar) 1597 – 11 March (Note: 6 February in the old calendar) 1666), or Lady Sen, was the eldest daughter of the samurai, daimyo and shōgun Tokugawa Hidetada and later the wife of Toyotomi Hideyori. She was remarried to Honda Tadatoki after the death of her first husband. Following the death of her second husband, she later became a Buddhist nun under the name of Tenjuin (天樹院).

== Biography ==
=== Early life ===
She was born in 1597 as the eldest daughter of the then-daimyo and later shōgun Tokugawa Hidetada and his wife Oeyo during the Warring-States period of Japanese history. Her paternal grandfather was the founder of the Tokugawa shogunate, Tokugawa Ieyasu; her maternal grandfather was Azai Nagamasa; her grandmother was Oichi, whose brother was Oda Nobunaga. When she was six or seven, her grandfather wanted her to marry Toyotomi Hideyori, who was the son of Toyotomi Hideyoshi.

In 1603, when Senhime was seven years old, she was married to the successor to the Toyotomi clan, Toyotomi Hideyori and lived with him in Osaka Castle along with his mother, Lady Yodo, who was a sister of Oeyo, Senhime's mother and was accompanied by her wet-nurse, Gyōbukyō no Tsubone. The marital relationship was recorded as good, but they were unable to have children. Her grandfather Tokugawa Ieyasu, besieged the castle in 1615, when she was nineteen. When Osaka castle fell, Hideyori committed ritual suicide beside his mother, his son was executed at the age of 7 years old. Senhime was rescued from the castle before it fell. Senhime also saved Hideyori's daughter with another woman, Tenshuni, and later adopted her.

=== Tadatoki's wife ===
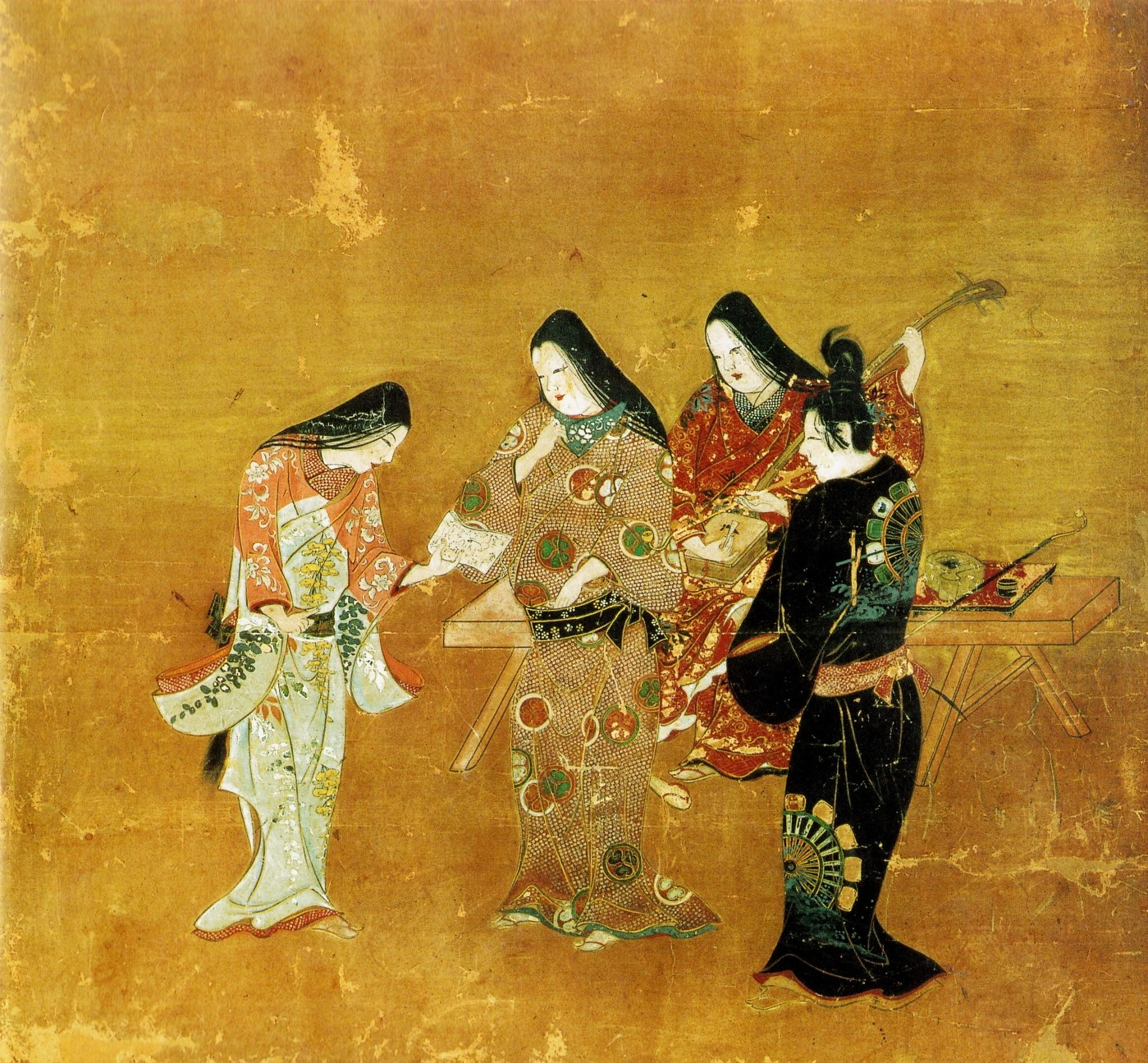
Senhime and Honda Heihachirō, a 17th-century depiction, Tokugawa Art Museum, Nagoya

In 1616, Ieyasu remarried Senhime to Honda Tadatoki, a grandson of Honda Tadakatsu, and in a few years she moved to Himeji. Honda Tadatoki's mother, Kumahime, was the daughter of Matsudaira Nobuyasu and hence a granddaughter of Ieyasu.

A famous legend tells that a certain Sakazaki Naomori planned to capture Senhime just before her remarriage, wishing to marry her himself. However his plan was revealed and Naomori was either killed or forced to commit suicide. It was long believed that Naomori was the one who saved Senhime out from the Osaka Castle, believing the words of Tokugawa Ieyasu that he would give Senhime to whoever rescued her, though recently this has been doubted. Stories tell that Senhime refused to marry Naomori, whose face was disfigured because of the burn he received when he saved her, and preferred the handsome Tadatoki.

Senhime and Tadatoki had an amicable marriage and had two children together: a daughter, Katsuhime (勝姫), and a son, Kōchiyo (幸千代). However tragedy struck when her son died at the age of three, and five years later in 1626, her husband died of tuberculosis. Her mother, Oeyo (then known as Sūgen'in) died in the same year. As was the tradition for a widow at that time, Senhime cut her hair short and became a Buddhist nun, taking the name Tenjuin (天樹院), moved back to Edo and spent the rest of her life there. After Tokugawa Ietsuna's adoptive mother, Oman no Kata (known as Eikōin) died, Tenjuin become Ietsuna's adoptive mother.

== Family ==
- Father: Tokugawa Hidetada (1581–1632)
- Mother: Oeyo (1573–1626)
- Husbands:
  - Toyotomi Hideyori (1593–1615)
  - Honda Tadatoki (1596–1626)
- Children:
  - Katsuhime (b. 1618) married Ikeda Mitsumasa
  - Kochiyo (1619–1621)

== Impact on culture ==
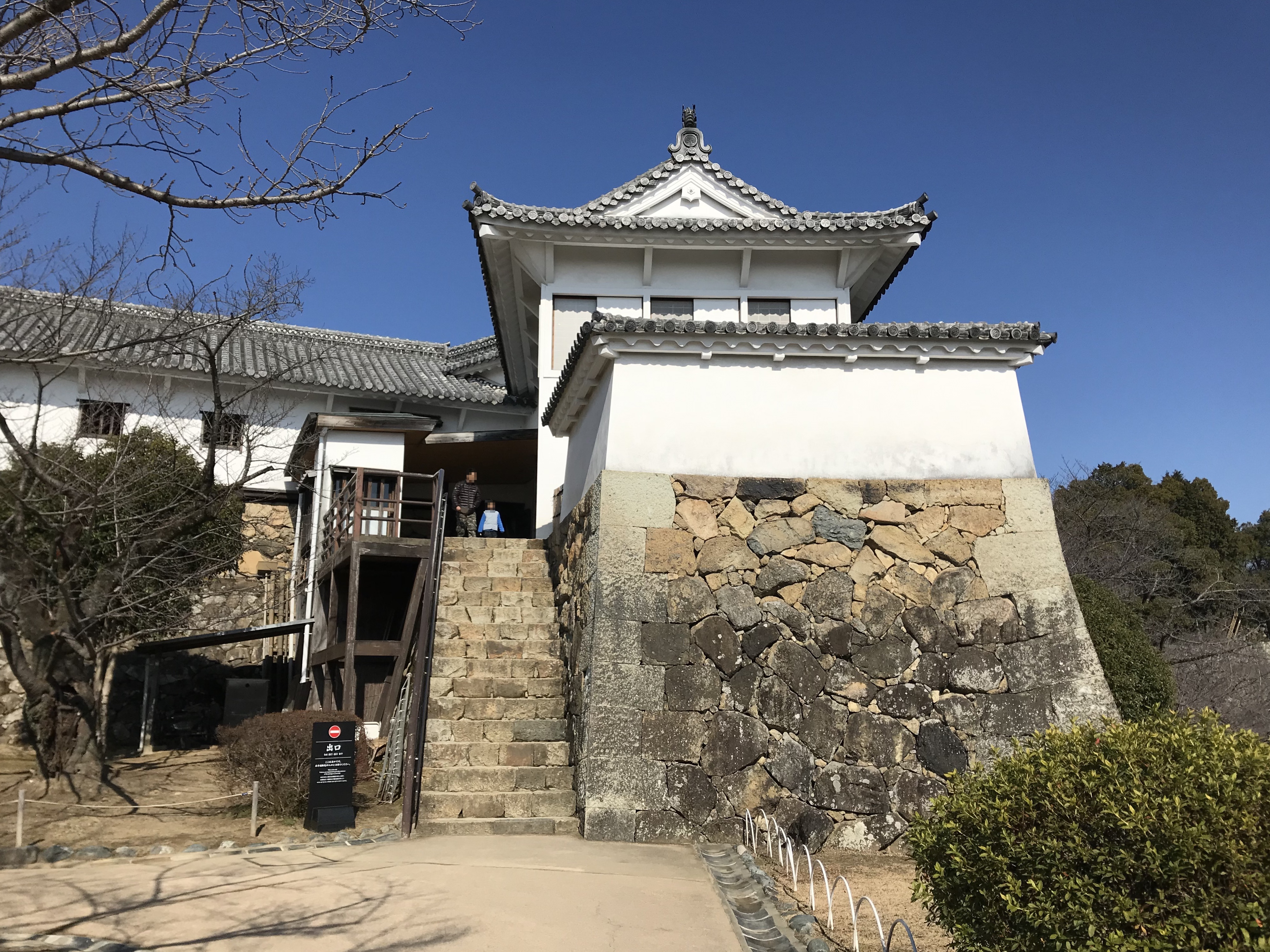
Keshō yagura (Dressing Tower) of Himeji Castle, attributed to her

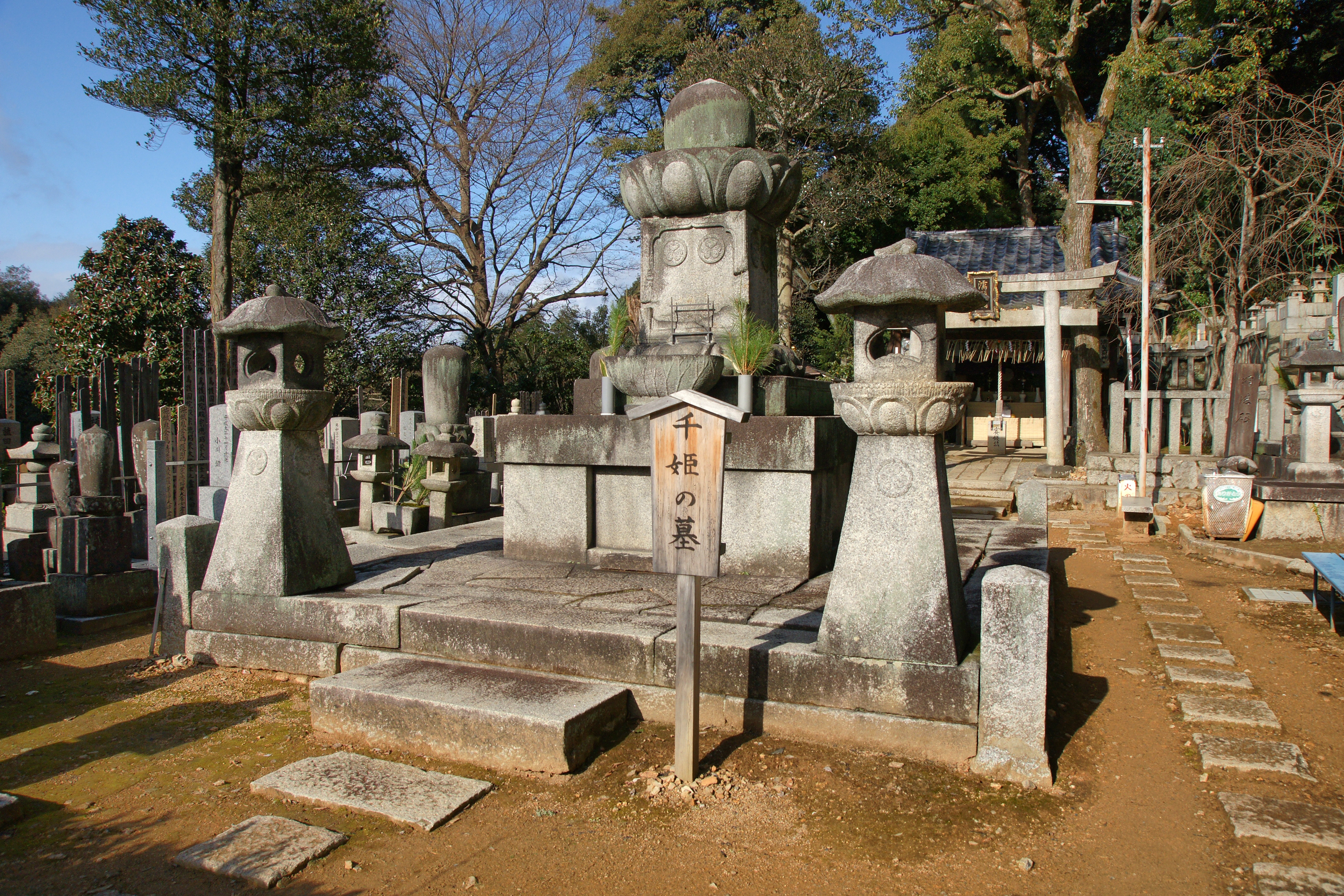
Senhime's grave at Chion-in, Kyōto

The dramatic life of Senhime produced many legends. Some legends talk about her tenderness, such as how she saved a daughter of her husband Hideyori and another of his wives at the Siege of Osaka. Some others depict her alleged lecherousness during her later days at Edo. Today, Senhime figures prominently in jidaigeki and taiga dorama (period dramas) in Japan.

Senhime is also a beloved figure in Himeji. Shortly after her marriage to Honda Tadatoki, they moved to Himeji Castle, a present-day world heritage site whose west wing was mostly constructed at that time. Most of the west wing is lost now, but a tower called keshō yagura (Dressing Tower) remains, where it is believed that her dressing chambers were.

Senhime appeared in the concluding storyline of the semi-fictional video game Kessen. In the final cutscene she laments to Ieyasu about the tragedy of war and the death of Hideyori, Ieyasu comforts her and replies that the people of Japan will once again live in peace and praises Hideyori for his duty as a samurai by committing seppuku.

Senhime also appeared in a 1962 movie Senhime to Hideyori, starring Hibari Misora as Senhime. The film begins from the siege and fall of Osaka castle and tells the fictionalized story of Senhime's later years after the death of Hideyori till her final confinement to the Buddhist temple. A more historical film about Senhime and the siege of Osaka Castle appeared in the mid-1950s entitled Princess Senhime, with Machiko Kyō in the title role.

Senhime appears in the 1955 historical novel Yodo-dono nikki by Yasushi Inoue.

== Literature ==
- Motoo, Hinago (1986). Japanese Castles. Tokyo: Kodansha. pp. 111–114. ISBN 0-87011-766-1.

== Family tree ==
Tokugawa Ieyasu | Azai Nagamasa | Oichi | Oda Nobunaga
Tokugawa Hidetada | Oeyo | Ohatsu | Yodo-dono | Toyotomi Hideyoshi | One
Tokugawa Iemitsu | Senhime | Toyotomi Hideyori
