= Kyōgoku Tadataka =

Japanese noble and daimyō

- 京極 忠高
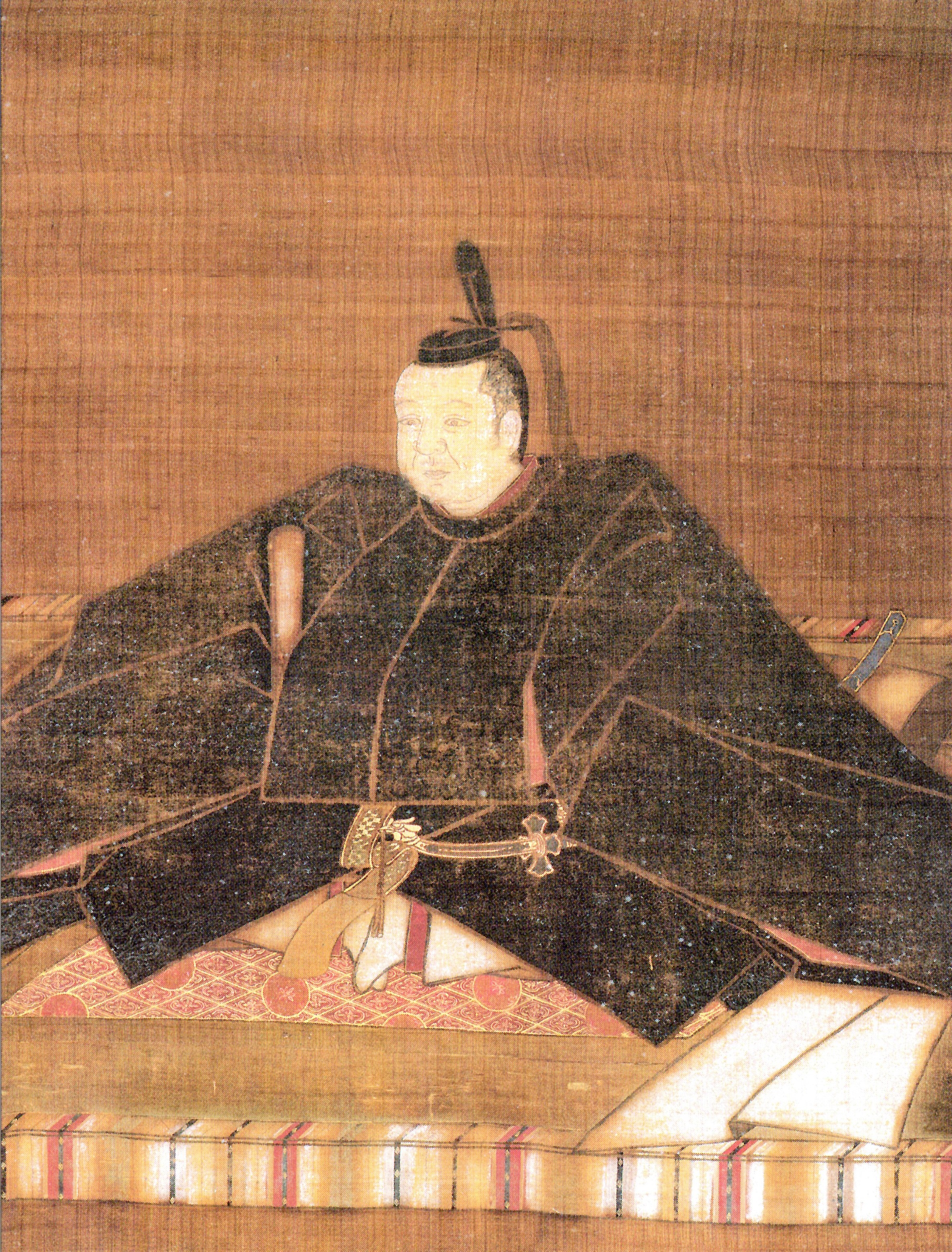

Personal details
- Born: Kumamaro; 1593
- Died: 1637 (aged 43–44)
- Parent: Kyōgoku Takatsugu (father)

Military service
- Allegiance: Tokugawa Shogunate
- Battles/wars: Osaka Campaign (1615)

Kyōgoku Tadataka (京極 忠高; 1593–1637) was a Japanese noble and the daimyō and head of the Kyōgoku clan (京極氏, Kyōgoku-shi) of Japan during the Edo period in the early 17th century.

== Life ==
His Childhood name was Kumamaro (熊麿). Kyōgoku Tadataka was a member and head of the powerful Kyōgoku clan who claimed their noble descent from Emperor Uda (868–897). He was the son of Kyōgoku Takatsugu and his concubine. His paternal grandfather was Kyōgoku Takayoshi.

Kyōgoku Tadataka is best known for his participation in the Tokugawa clans 1615 military campaign for Osaka where he commanded 2,000 troops in service to the Tokugawas. During this campaign, he successfully led a flanking maneuver against the defenders of Osaka Castle in the Shigino area northeast of the castle together with Ishikawa Tadafusa and fellow clan member Kyōgoku Takatomo. This maneuver was instrumental in the Tokugawa victory.

Later from 1620 to 1629, Kyōgoku Tadataka is recorded as having spent ninety two thousand koku on the re-construction of Osaka Castle.

== Marriage and descendants ==
Kyōgoku Tadataka was married to the fourth daughter of Matsudaira Tadanao. In 1607, he married the fourth daughter of Tokugawa Hidetada, a marriage which did not produce any heirs. As such, the lands and assets of the family should have reverted to the ruling shōgun. However, the bakufu acted to continue his line by posthumously designating Kyōgoku Takakazu as an heir. Takakazu was Tadataka's nephew, the son of his brother Takamasa. Tadakazu was initially enfeoffed at Tatsuno (50,000 koku) in Harima Province.

== Family ==
- Father: Kyōgoku Takatsugu
- Mother: Yamada-dono
- Foster Mother: Ohatsu
- Wife: Hatsuhime (1602 – 1630)
- Concubine: unknown
- Daughter: Ichiko married Taga Tsuneyoshi
- Adopted Son: Kyogoku Takakazu (1619-1662)

== See also ==
- Siege of Osaka

Preceded by Kyōgoku Takatsugu	Head of the Kyōgoku clan –1637	Succeeded by Kyōgoku Takakazu
