= Yodo-dono =

Japanese samurai class woman

- 淀殿
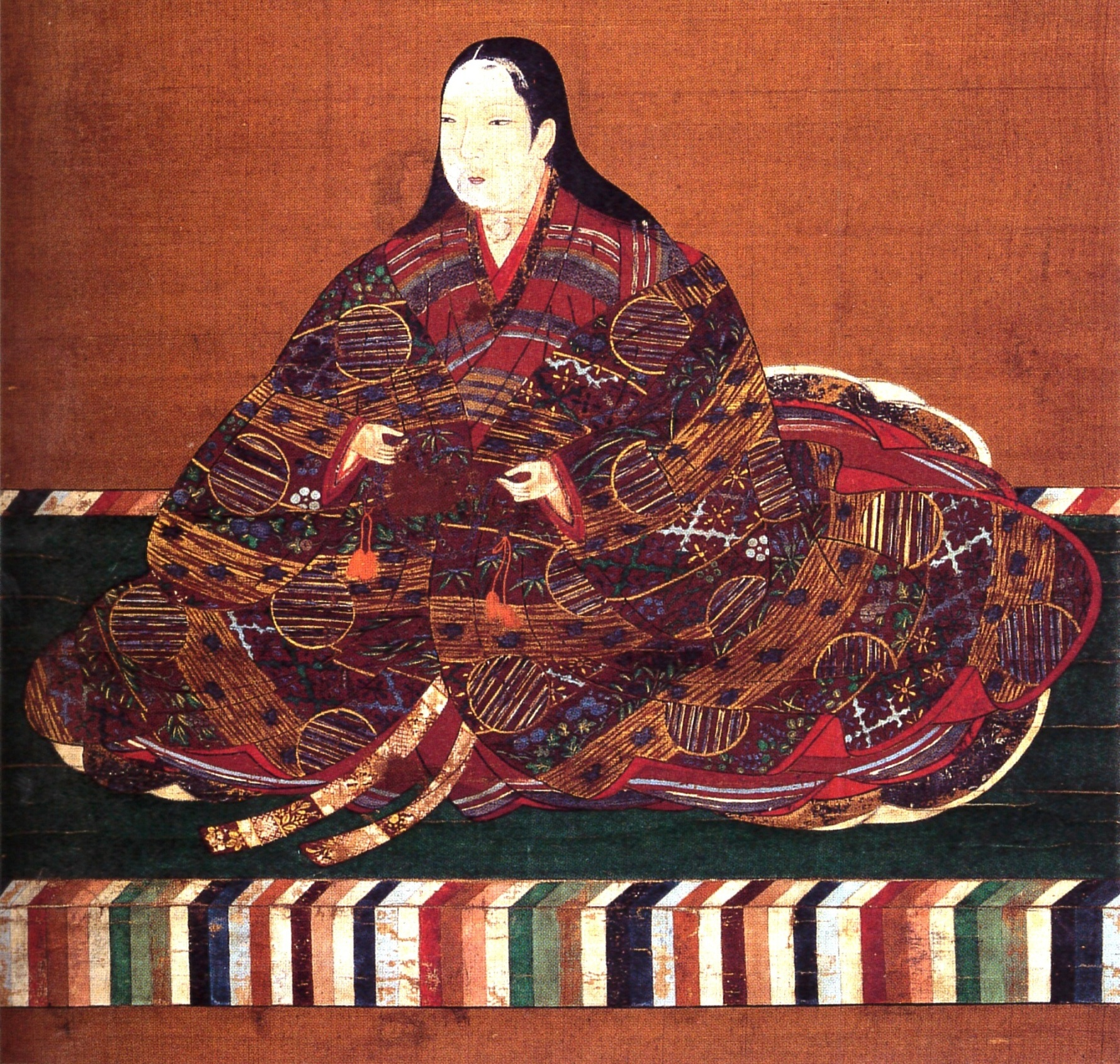

Personal details
- Born: Chacha (茶々); 1569
- Died: 4 June 1615 (aged 47–48) Osaka Castle
- Spouse: Toyotomi Hideyoshi
- Children: Toyotomi Tsurumatsu; Toyotomi Hideyori
- Parents: Azai Nagamasa (father); Oichi (mother)
- Relatives: Ohatsu (sister); Oeyo (sister); Oda Nobunaga (uncle); Kyōgoku Maria (aunt); Shibata Katsuie (step-father); Nene (adopted mother); Ōno Harunaga (foster brother)

Military service
- Allegiance: Toyotomi clan
- Battles/wars: Siege of Osaka

Yodo-dono (淀殿) or Yodo-gimi (淀君; [jò̞.dó̞.ɡ̟ʲì.mʲì, -ŋ̟ʲì.mʲì, -ɡ̟ʲí.mʲí, -ŋ̟ʲí.mʲí], 1569 – June 4, 1615), also known as Lady Chacha (茶々; [c̟͡ɕä́.c̟͡ɕä̀]), was a Japanese historical figure in the late Sengoku period. She was the concubine and the second wife of Japanese ruler Toyotomi Hideyoshi. As the mother of his son and successor Hideyori, she acted as Hideyori's guardian in the restoration of the Toyotomi clan after the fall of the Council of Five Elders, and alongside her son, led the last anti-Tokugawa shogunate resistance in the siege of Osaka.

She was the daughter of Oichi and sister of Ohatsu and Oeyo. When her two younger sisters became prominent members linked to the Tokugawa clan, she and her sisters became vital to maintaining the diplomatic relations between the two most powerful clans of the time, Toyotomi and Tokugawa. Her sister, Oeyo, was the wife of the second shogun, Tokugawa Hidetada, and matriarch of the successive shoguns' lineage, thus receiving the political title Omidaidokoro.

In the efforts to exalt the Tokugawa Shogunate, Yodo-dono was frequently portrayed as a "wicked and wanton" woman who planned the Toyotomis' death. After Hideyoshi's death in 1598, she took tonsure as a Buddhist nun, taking the name Daikōin (大広院). She was also the founder of the temple Yogen-in (養源院).

Her time period being that of large turmoil and overhaul, Yodo-dono was involved in both politics and administration. The great wealth and changing fortunes of her family had also affected Yodo-dono's life. The surviving accounting books from luxury goods merchants provide insight into the patterns of patronage and tastes amongst the privileged class of women like Yodo-dono and her sisters.

== Genealogy ==
Yodo-dono, also called Chacha (茶々) in her youth, was the eldest of three daughters of the Sengoku period daimyō Azai Nagamasa. Her mother, Oichi, was the younger sister of Oda Nobunaga.

After Nagamasa's death, Toyotomi Hideyoshi became Chacha's adoptive father and protector. However, her status changed when she became his concubine and again when she became the mother of his heir.

Lady Okurakyo no tsubone (Ono Harunaga's mother), Lady Aeba no tsubone (the second daughter of her grandaunt, Kaitsu-dono), and Otsubone (the wife of Maeda Toshiie's brother, Sawaki Yoshiyuki) were Chacha's wet nurses.

Yodo-dono's middle sister, Ohatsu, was the wife of Kyōgoku Takatsugu and the mother of Kyōgoku Tadataka.

Yodo-dono's youngest sister, Oeyo, also known as Ogō, was the principal wife of Shōgun Tokugawa Hidetada and the mother of his successor Tokugawa Iemitsu.

== Early years ==
In 1570, Chacha's father, Nagamasa, broke his alliance with Oda Nobunaga, which was followed by a three-year period of fighting, until 1573, when Nobunaga's army surrounded Nagamasa at Odani Castle. Nobunaga, however, requested the safe return of his sister, Oichi. Chacha, along with her mother and her two sisters, left the castle with her. Thereafter, Odani Castle fell, with Chacha's father and her only brother, Manpukumaru, being amongst those who died.

Nobunaga's death in 1582 led to open hostilities between Shibata Katsuie and Hashiba Hideyoshi over the issue of succession. Katsuie's forces were eventually defeated at the Battle of Shizugatake, and he was forced to retreat to Kitanosho Castle. With Hideyoshi's army laying siege to his home, Katsuie set the castle ablaze, in which he and Oichi perished.

Before her death, Oichi placed Chacha, Oeyo, and Ohatsu in Hideyoshi's care. Skilled in Waka poetry, Chacha was ranked the highest among the princesses of the Azai family. She treated her sisters and other relatives fairly, and she was known for her passionate speeches about the Toyotomi's future.

== Concubine of Hideyoshi ==
In 1588, Yodogimi became pregnant. Hideyoshi, who had no sons, was greatly pleased. His younger brother, Toyotomi Hidenaga, remodeled Yodo Castle in March 1589, which Hideyoshi gave to Chacha. Hideyoshi's wife, Nene, did not have children, and Lady Yodo thus inherited many of her privileges. Yodo-dono had two sons with Hideyoshi, Tsurumatsu (d. 1591) and Hideyori (b. 1593), the latter becoming Hideyoshi's designated successor. After giving birth to Hideyori, Yodo-dono gave the important posts of guarding him to Ōkurakyō no Tsubone and Aeba no Tsubone.

In 1594, the family moved to Fushimi Castle. The tragedy fell, however, when Hideyoshi died in 1598. As a result, the Toyotomi clan lost much of its influence and importance. Yodo-dono founded the temple Yogen-in (養源院) in memory of her father, Azai Nagamasa, and her mother, Oichi, and she contributed to the restoration of the temples in Koya-san Mountain and others. She then moved to Osaka Castle with her son Hideyori, where she planned the restoration of the Toyotomi clan. As Hideyori's guardian, she was involved in politics and became the de facto head of Osaka Castle.

== Struggles against Tokugawa Clan ==
=== Sekigahara Campaign (1600) ===
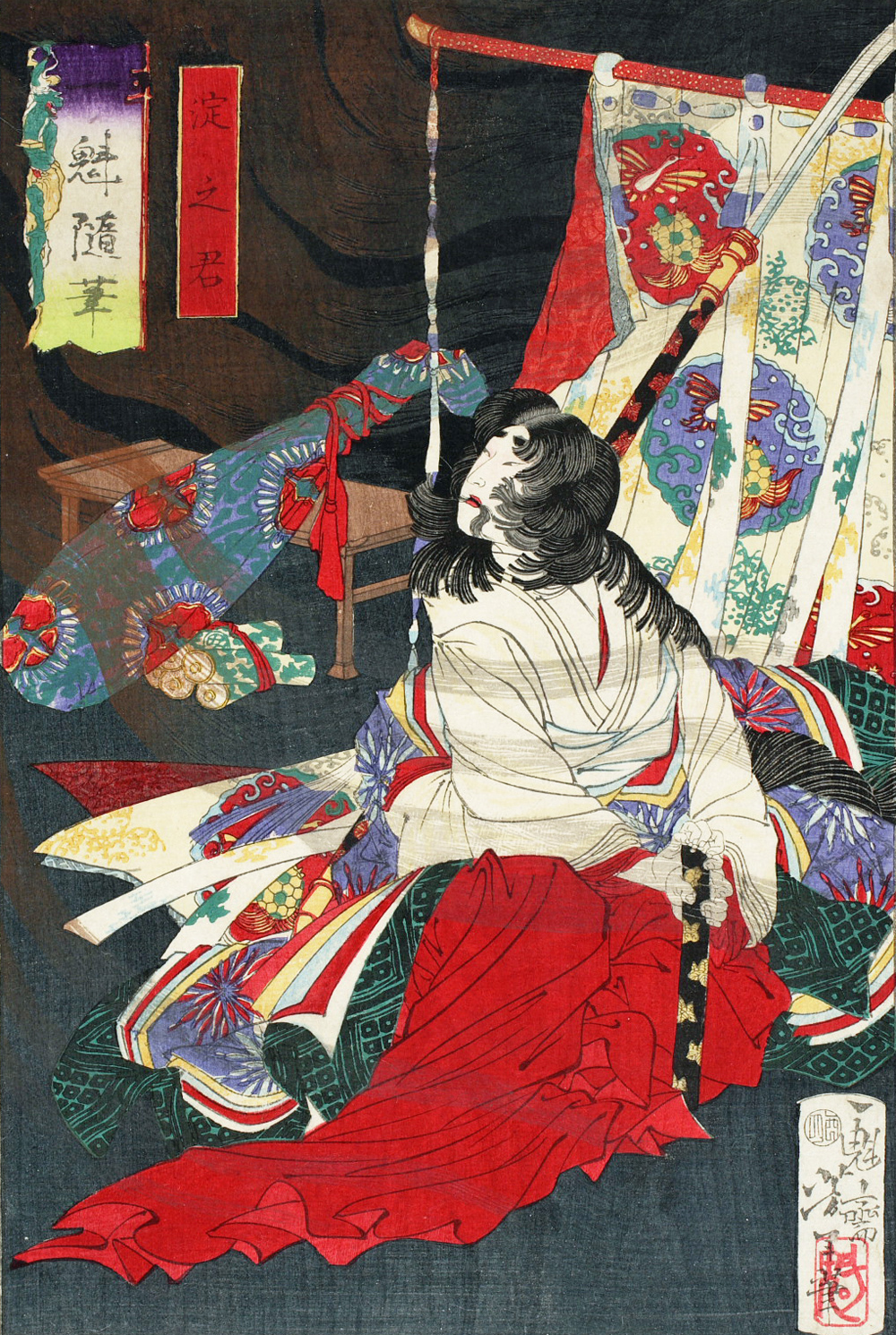
''Yodo no Kimi'' woodblock print by Tsukioka Yoshitoshi.

After Hideyoshi's death in 1598, Hideyori became his successor, with Yodo-dono becoming the mother of paramount. Still a child, Hideyori could not manage the retainer, and the conflict between the front generals and the administrative staff escalated. Tokugawa Ieyasu stirred up the conflicts between the two parties by supporting the front generals.

In 1600, news spread that Ishida Mitsunari, one of the former Five Commissioners, along with Otani Yoshitsugu, was planning a rebellion against Tokugawa Ieyasu, who was leading an expedition toward Aizu. In response to this, Yodo-dono and three commissioners, Masuda Nagamori, Nagatsuka Tadashi, and Maeda Gensaku, sent an urgent letter to Ieyasu to hasten his journey to Kyoto to quell the crisis.

When Mōri Terumoto entered Osaka Castle as the overall commander of the Ishida faction (Western Army), supported by the three commissioners, Yodo-dono maintained a stance of vigilance on behalf of the Toyotomi family. She did not issue a warrant of approval for Hideyori, which the Ishida side had hoped for; nor did she initiate Hideyori's deployment. Although she acknowledged the movements of the Ishida faction, she refrained from active participation.

Ieyasu used the letters from Yodo-dono and others as evidence to convince other feudal lords that Ishida and Otani's actions constituted a rebellion. Later, the three commissioners signed the "Internal Council Oath" condemning Ieyasu, but the absence of any document retracting the earlier letter from Yodo-dono allowed Ieyasu to maintain the noble cause "for the sake of Hideyori."

After the victory of the Tokugawa side (Eastern Army) in the Battle of Sekigahara on September 15, Ieyasu sent Ōno Harunaga to Osaka Castle to convey his belief that Yodo-dono and Hideyori were not involved with the Western Army. Yodo-dono, in response, expressed her gratitude. Following Mōri Terumoto's withdrawal from Osaka Castle, Ieyasu entered the castle. When Yodo-dono entertained Ieyasu and offered her sake cup, she insisted that he pass it on to Hideyori. Ieyasu then publicly declared himself Hideyori's surrogate father.

Even though Yodo-dono did not actively participate in the Battle of Sekigahara, more than 2,000 Toyotomi vassals were said to have participated in the battle, causing the Tokugawa-Toyotomi relations to decline. As Ieyasu distributed the Toyotomi family land as a prize for Sekigahara, the Toyotomi family's control weakened. After the battle, Yodo-dono confronted Ieyasu, who began putting together a military government in Edo. She refused his requirement for Hideyori to show his vassalage and go to the capital, Kyoto.

In 1601, Yodo-dono's "depression" intensified, as she suffered from chest pains, eating disorders, and headaches, for which she was prescribed medicine by Gensaku Makunaose, as documented in "Gensakudo Sanpoyakuroku".

=== Formation of the Tokugawa Shogunate ===
In 1603, Tokugawa Ieyasu was named Shogun by Emperor Go-Yōzei, and Yodo-dono began to actively resist him. Hideyori retained Osaka Castle, having married Princess Senhime, the daughter of Ieyasu's son Tokugawa Hidetada. However, there was no room for two rulers. Even though Hideyori's former retainers had secured Osaka Castle and inherited huge amount of property from Hideyoshi, they now supported the Tokugawa shogunate, which significantly weakened Hideyori's position.

In 1605, on May 8, Ieyasu, through the mediation of Kōdai-in (Nene), demanded that Hideyori demonstrate his allegiance to the Tokugawa clan by paying homage. Yodo-dono, in her efforts to preserve the Toyotomi clan's status, expressed her dissatisfaction about the territorial reductions and declined the meeting. Ieyasu responded by sending his sixth son, Matsudaira Tadatoki, to Osaka to seek reconciliation and harmony.

In 1611, after meeting with Ieyasu for two hours at Nijō Castle, Hideyori finally left Osaka. Contrary to the popular belief about the heir's "uselessness", as promoted by Hideyori's personal guardian Katagiri Katsumoto (serving since 1599 upon assignment by Ieyasu), who hoped to mitigate any potential aggression against the young heir, Hideyori's demeanor surprised Ieyasu.

=== Incident of Hoko-ji Bell ===
In 1614, the Toyotomi clan rebuilt Osaka Castle. The head of the clan also sponsored the rebuilding of Hōkō-ji in Kyoto. These temple renovations included the casting of the great bronze bell with the inscriptions that read "May the state be peaceful and prosperous" (国家安康 kokka ankō) and "May noble lord and servants be rich and cheerful" (君臣豊楽 kunshin hōraku). However, the shogunate interpreted "kokka ankō" (国家安康) as shattering Ieyasu's name (家康) to curse him and "kunshin hōraku" (君臣豊楽) as meaning "Toyotomi's force (豊臣) will rise again," which meant treachery against the shogunate. The tension between the Tokugawa and the Toyotomi clans intensified, deepening even further when Toyotomi gathered a force of rōnin and the shogunate's enemies in Osaka. Ieyasu, despite having passed the title of Shōgun to his son in 1605, nevertheless maintained significant influence.

After the Hōkō-ji Temple Bell Incident, Yodo-dono sent Lady Ōkurakyo, Lady Aeba, and Katagiri Katsumoto to Sunpu Castle to meet with Tokugawa Ieyasu. During this meeting, Ieyasu hatched a plot to split the members of the Toyotomi family. On the one hand, he humbly proposed a generous demand towards Lady Ōkurakyo. On the other hand, he imposed severe demands on Katagiri Katsumoto, who represented the moderates and had been petitioning Ieyasu to save the Toyotomi family.

=== Katagiri Katsumoto overthrow ===
Despite Katagiri Katsumoto's attempts to mediate the situation, Ieyasu found an ideal pretext to take a belligerent stance against Yodo-dono and Hideyori. The situation worsened in September of that year, when the news reached Edo that a large number of rōnin were grouping in Osaka at Hideyori's invitation. Katsumoto proposed that Yodo-dono be sent to Edo as a hostage, hoping to avoid hostilities. However, she either flatly refused or ultimately accepted but was denied by Hideyori. Suspecting Katsumoto of trying to betray the Toyotomi clan, Yodo-dono finally banished him from Osaka Castle, along with Oda Urakusai and several other servants accused of treason. Following their banishment, they entered the service of the Tokugawa clan, thus shattering any hope to reach an agreement with the shogunate. This led to the siege of Osaka.

=== Siege of Osaka ===
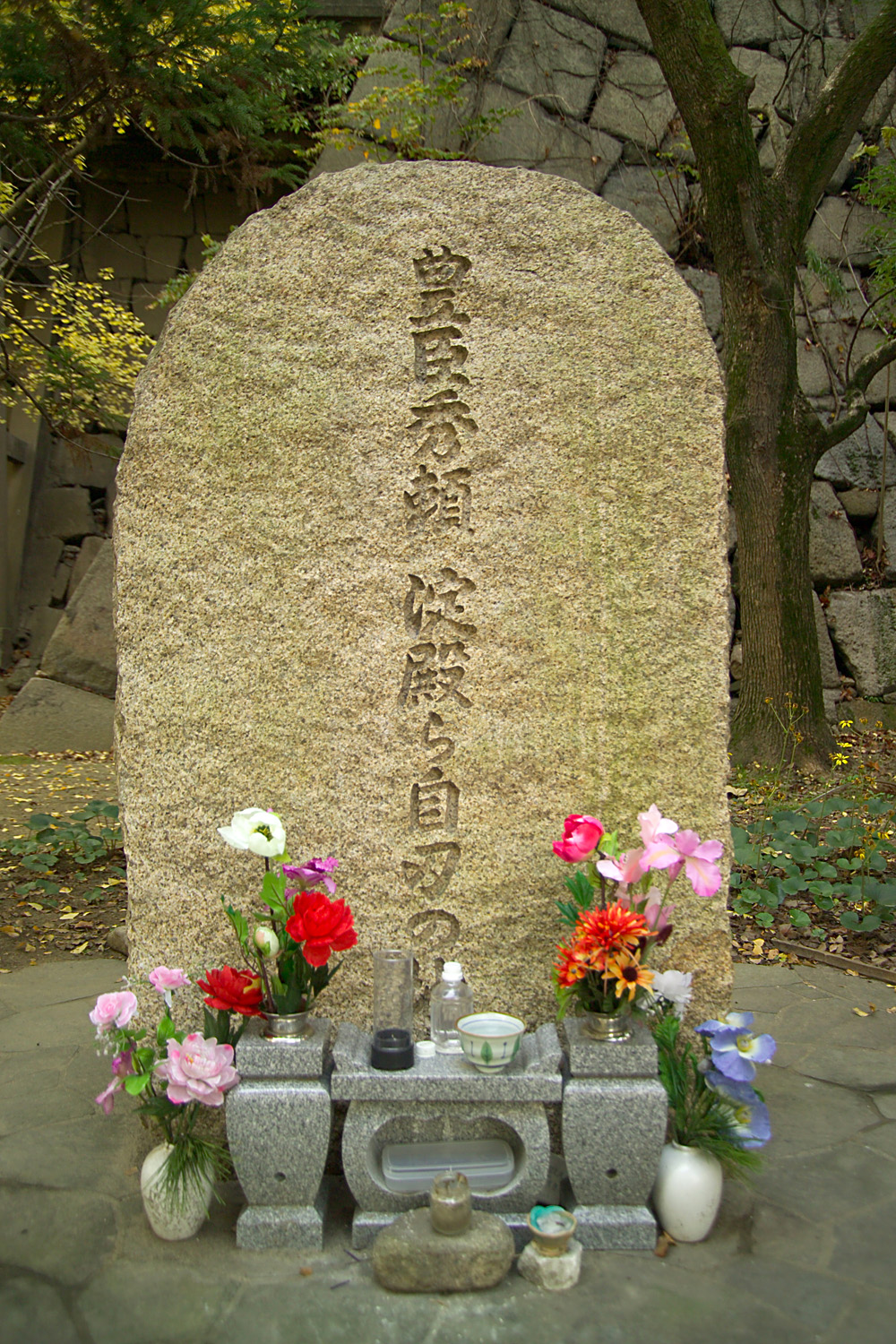
Memorial in place where Yodo-dono and Hideyori committed suicide after the fall of Osaka Castle.

Tokugawa Ieyasu, who seized control from Hideyori after Hideyoshi's death, now regarded Hideyori an obstacle to the unification of Japan. In 1614, Ieyasu laid siege to Osaka Castle. Yodo-dono sought assistance from daimyos across Japan, but none dared to oppose the shogunate and side with the Toyotomi clan. Left with no choice, she recruited Rōnin (masterless samurai) with gold and silver, using them as her military force. She defended the castle with her son, actively participating in the siege. When the Tokugawa army bombed her room and killed two of her maids, Yodo-dono emerged from her mansion with a group of armed and armored women. She later told the warriors to make a peace treaty. Following the meeting with Lady Acha, who was accompanied by Honda Masazumi and Ohatsu (Yodo-dono's younger sister), the peace treaty was accepted by both sides.

However, in 1615, Ieyasu broke the truce and once again attacked Osaka Castle. Yodo-dono and her son, Hideyori, committed suicide as Osaka Castle burned, ending the Toyotomi legacy. No eyewitness accounts or records detailing her final moments have survived, and her body was never found. This gave rise to speculations and theories about what happened to her after the fall of the Toyotomi clan. According to some, Yodo-dono and Hideyori managed to escape and survive, with the varying speculations about their escape route. Others believe that she may have sought refuge with the Shimazu clan in Satsuma Province or she may have fled as far as Utsunomiya in Kōzuke Province.

== Family ==
- Father: Azai Nagamasa (1545-1573)
- Mother: Oichi (1547-1583)
- Adopted mother: Nene (d. 1624)
- Husband: Toyotomi Hideyoshi (1537-1598) (Hideyoshi also is her adopted father)
- Sons:
  - Toyotomi Tsurumatsu (1589–1591)
  - Toyotomi Hideyori (1593-1615)
- Adopted daughter:
  - Toyotomi Sadako (1592–1658), daughter of Oeyo later married Kujō Yukiie

== Cultural references ==
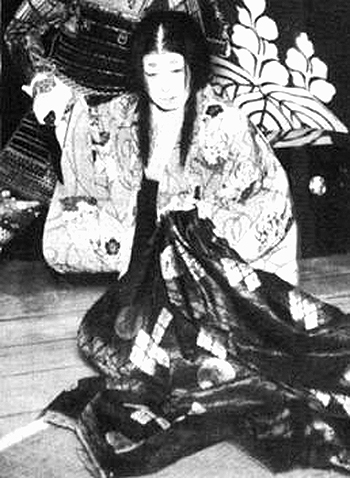
Nakamura Utaemon V as Yodo-gimi in the kabuki play Hototogisu Kojō no Rakugetsu

A fictional character based on Yodo-dono appears in James Clavell's Shōgun. This contrived protagonist is Lady Ochiba, who dislikes Toranaga (Tokugawa Ieyasu) because he presumably suspects that her son was not fathered by the Taikō (Toyotomi Hideyoshi). However, she admires and trusts the Taikō's widow, Yodoko (Nene), who urges both her and Toranaga to marry so that Japan would remain united and the heir, Yaemon (Toyotomi Hideyori), would safely take control upon coming of age. In James Clavell's later novels, it is revealed that, just as in real history, Toranaga eventually besieged Ochiba and Yaemon in their castle, prompting them to commit suicide.

In the 2011 Taiga drama, Gō: Hime-tachi no Sengoku, Cha-cha was portrayed by Japanese actress Rie Miyazawa.

In board games, she appears as one of the characters of the expansion Rising Sun of the card game Samurai Sword by Emiliano Sciarra.

In the 2026 Taiga drama, Brothers in Arms, Lady Cha-cha was portrayed by Japanese actress Nagi Inoue.

== See also ==
- List of female castellans in Japan
- Onna-musha

== Bibliography ==
- Hickman, Money L., John T. Carpenter and Bruce A. Coats. (2002). Japan's Golden Age: Momoyama. New Haven: Yale University Press. ISBN 978-0-300-09407-7; OCLC 34564921
- Bryant, Anthony. Sekigahara 1600: The Final Struggle for Power. Praeger Publishers, 2005
