= Kyōgoku Takatsugu =

Japanese daimyō (1560–1609)

- 京極 高次
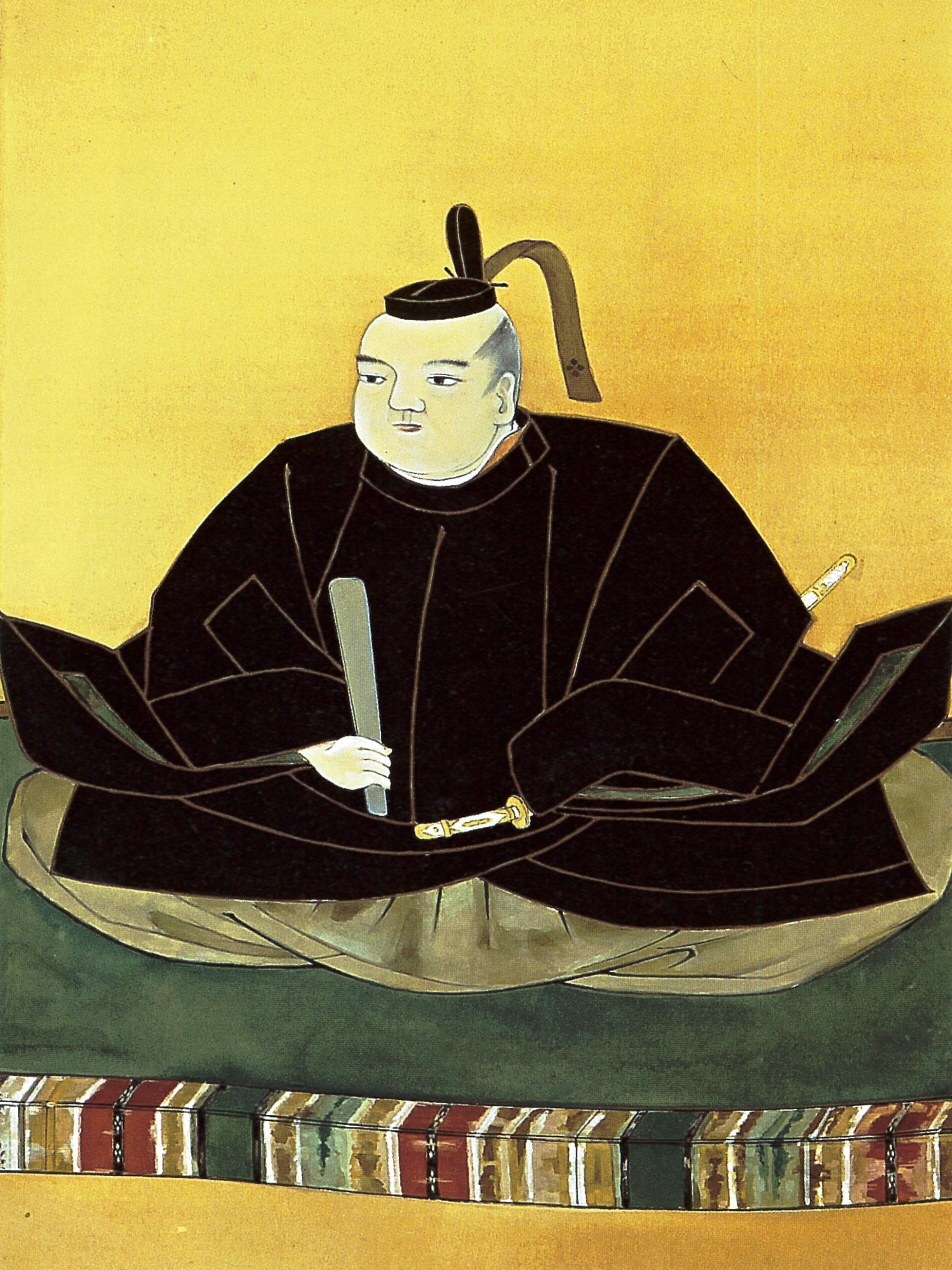

Head of Kyōgoku clan
- In office 1581–1609
- Preceded by: Kyōgoku Takayoshi
- Succeeded by: Kyōgoku Tadataka

Personal details
- Born: Koboshi; 1560
- Died: June 4, 1609 (aged 48–49)
- Spouse: Ohatsu
- Children: Kyōgoku Tadataka
- Parents: Kyōgoku Takayoshi (father); Kyōgoku Maria (mother)

Military service
- Allegiance: Oda clan Toyotomi clan Eastern Army; Tokugawa shogunate
- Rank: Daimyo
- Unit: Kyōgoku clan
- Battles/wars: Siege of Ōtsu (1600)

Kyōgoku Takatsugu (京極 高次; 1560 – June 4, 1609) was a daimyō (military feudal lord) of Ōmi Province and Wakasa Province during the late Sengoku period of Japan's history.

== Biography ==
His childhood name was Koboshi (小法師). Takatsugu is recognized as the founder of the modern Kyōgoku clan. His forebears had been powerful since the 13th century, but their fortunes had waned after the Ōnin War. Takatsugu is credited with restoring his family's lost prominence and position.

Takatsugu allied himself with Oda Nobunaga; and after Nobunaga's death, Takatsugu became a fudai (hereditary vassal) daimyo of the Toyotomi. Hideyoshi installed Takatsugu at Ōtsu Castle (60,000 koku) in Ōmi province.

In 1600, he sided with the Tokugawa. On the same day as the Battle of Sekigahara, failed in his efforts at the Siege of Ōtsu, but Tokugawa Ieyasu's victory at Sekigahara marginalized the consequences of that loss. In that same year, Takatsugu was rewarded with the fief of Obama (92,000 koku) in Wakasa Province.

Under the Tokugawa shogunate, the Kyōgoku were identified as tozama or outsiders, in contrast with the fudai daimyo who were hereditary vassals of the Tokugawa.

== Family ==
- Father: Kyōgoku Takayoshi
- Mother: Kyōgoku Maria
- Wife: Ohatsu
- Sister: Kyōgoku Tatsuko
- Concubine:
  - Yamada-dono
  - Ogura
- Sons:
  - Kyōgoku Tadataka by Yamada-dono
  - Atage Takamasa by Ogura

== Genealogy ==
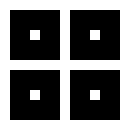
The mon of the Kyōgoku clan

The tozama Kyōgoku claimed descent from Emperor Uda (868–897) by his grandson Minamoto no Masanobu (920–993). They represent a branch of the Sasaki clan who were adopted by the Seiwa Genji.

His sister, Kyōgoku Tatsuko, also known as Matsu no maru-dono, was one of Toyotomi Hideyoshi's concubine.

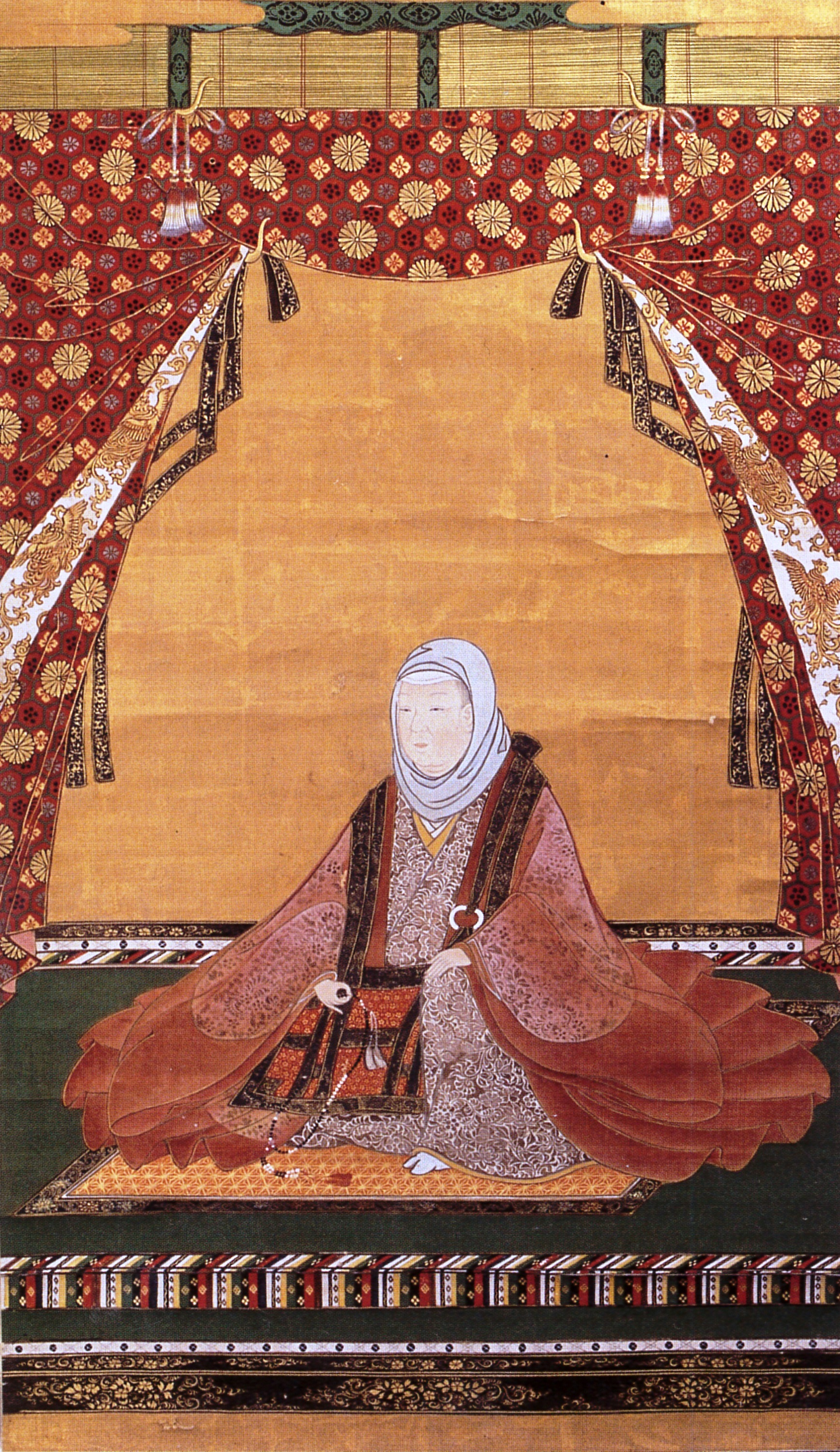
Takatsugu's wife, Ohatsu

Takatsugu's father was Kyōgoku Takayoshi, and his mother was Azai Nagamasa's sister Maria. Takatsugu married Ohatsu, the second of three daughters of his uncle. Ohatsu's mother, Oichi, was the younger sister of Oda Nobunaga. Takatsugu became a close relative by marrying Nobunaga's niece.

The older sister of Takatsugu's wife, Yodo-dono, was the concubine of Toyotomi Hideyoshi and mother of his heir Toyotomi Hideyori. Takatsugu's sister and Yodo-dono's cousin, Kyōgoku Tatsuko, also became Hideyoshi's concubine. In marriage, Takatsugu became a brother-in-law of Hideyoshi.

The younger sister of Takatsugu's wife, Oeyo, was the wife of second shogun Tokugawa Hidetada and the mother of third shogun Iemitsu. In marriage, Takatsugu became a brother-in-law of Hidetada.

After Takatsugu's death in 1609, Ohatsu became a Buddhist nun, taking the name Jōkō-in (常高院). With connections to both the Toyotomi and the Tokugawa, the Ohatsu had long served as a liaison between the rivals. She continued in this role until 1615 when the Tokugawa eliminated the Toyotomi in Osaka.

Kyōgoku Tadataka (1593–1637) was Takatsugu's son. In 1607, Tadataka married the fourth daughter of Shōgun Hidetada. He died without leaving any heirs, which meant that his holdings reverted to the shogunate. However, the bakufu acted to continue his line by posthumously designating Kyōgoku Takakazu as an heir. Takakazu was Tadataka's nephew, the son of his brother Takamasa. Tadakazu was initially enfeoffed at Tatsuno (50,000 koku) in Harima Province.

In 1658, Takakazu was transferred to Marugame in Sanuki Province, where the contrived descendants of Takatsugu remained until the abolition of the han system in 1871. The head of this Kyōgoku clan branch were ennobled as an hereditary viscount in the Meiji period.
