= Kyōgoku Takatomo =

Japanese daimyō

Kyōgoku Takatomo (京極 高知; 1572 – 17 September 1622) was a daimyō of the Azuchi–Momoyama period and the early Edo period. He was the second son of Kyōgoku Takayoshi and Kyōgoku Maria, also Takatsugu's younger brother.

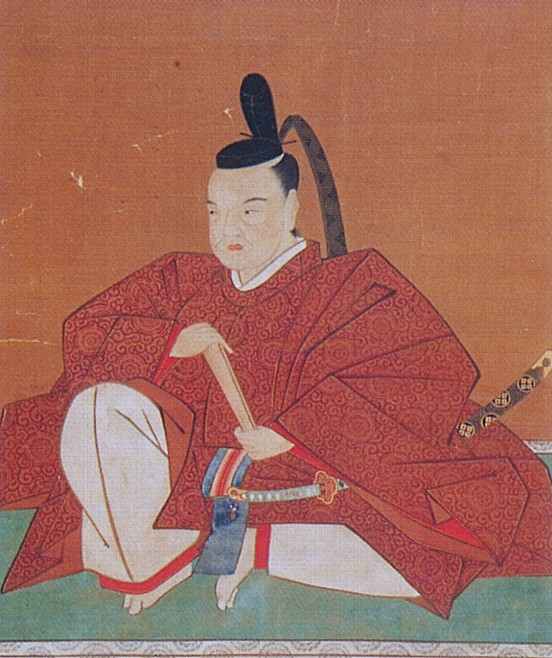
Kyōgoku Takatomo

In 1592, Toyotomi Hideyoshi gave him the domain at Iida (80,000 koku) in Shinano Province in central Honshu, but he took sides with the Tokugawa clan in the Sekigahara Campaign. For his loyalty, he was given 78,000 koku and the Miyazu Domain in Tango Province, where he established himself until his death. His adopted heir Kyōgoku Takahiro went on to manage the domain after his death.
