= Kyōgoku Maria =

Japanese noble lady and religious leader

- 京極マリア
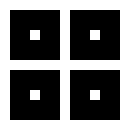

Personal life
- Born: 1543
- Died: 1618 (aged 74–75)
- Spouse: Kyōgoku Takayoshi
- Children: Kyōgoku Takatsugu; Kyōgoku Takatomo; Kyōgoku Tatsuko
- Parent: Azai Hisamasa (father)
- Known for: Christian convert and catechist (Kirishitan)
- Occupation: Missionary
- Relatives: Azai Nagamasa (brother); Oichi (sister-in-law)

Religious life
- Religion: Christianity
- Dharma name: Yōfuku-in (養福院)
- Military career
- Allegiance: Azai clan
- Unit: Kyōgoku clan

Kyōgoku Maria (京極マリア) or Yōfuku-in (養福院) (1543 – August 20, 1618) was a Japanese noble lady and religious leader from the Sengoku period to the early Edo period. She was the second daughter of Azai Hisamasa as well as Azai Nagamasa's elder sister and the mother of Kyōgoku Takatsugu and Kyōgoku Takatomo. She was the mostly successful woman catechist with her own assistants as well as Naitō Julia and her women catechists. She faced the rules of samurai governments, staying true to her missionary campaigns even when Christianity was banned in Japan.

== Life ==
Her birth name is unknown, but she was given the name "Maria" after her conversion to Christianity. She was baptized with her husband Kyōgoku Takayoshi in the Jesuits church in Kyoto in 1581, though Takayoshi died soon after being baptized. After becoming a widow, she began preaching her new religion to people around her, and Jesuits named her one of the best female catechists of the Kyoto-Osaka area.

Sometime in 1606 or 1607, Maria moved to Wakasa Province under Takatsugu's protection, and in 1609 she moved again to a remote place in Tango Province to avoid the persecution of Christians. She died peacefully in a small hut belonging to a Buddhist nunnery Sengen-ji (泉源寺) in 1618.

One of her daughters, Kyōgoku Tatsuko, is notable for being one of Toyotomi Hideyoshi's favorite concubines.

== Family ==
- Father: Azai Hisamasa (1526–1573)
- Brother: Azai Nagamasa (1545–1573)
- Husband: Kyōgoku Takayoshi (1504–1581)
- Son: Kyōgoku Takatsugu (1563–1609), Kyōgoku Takatomo (1572–1622)
- Daughter: Kyōgoku Tatsuko (d. 1634), Kyōgoku Magdalena
- Niece: Ohatsu, (1570–1633)
