= Kyōgoku Takayoshi =

Son of Kyogoku Takakiyo and a nominal vassal of the Azai clan

Kyōgoku Takayoshi (京極高吉; 1508 – 28 February 1581) was a son of Kyōgoku Takakiyo and a nominal vassal of the Azai clan.

Following Ashikaga Yoshiteru's murder in 1565, Takayoshi attended to Ashikaga Yoshiaki. He fell out of favour with Oda Nobunaga after Ashikaga Yoshiaki's banishment from Kyoto in 1573.

== Family ==
- Father: Kyōgoku Takakiyo
- Wife: Kyōgoku Maria
- Children:
  - Kyōgoku Takatsugu by Kyōgoku Maria
  - Kyōgoku Takatomo by Kyōgoku Maria
  - Kyōgoku Tatsuko married Takeda Motoaki later become Toyotomi Hideyoshi's concubines by Kyōgoku Maria
  - daughter married Ujiie Yukihiro
  - Magdalena married Kutsuki Nobutsuna by Kyōgoku Maria
