= Toyotomi Kunimatsu =

Japanese aristocrat (1608–1615)

Toyotomi Kunimatsu (豊臣 国松; 1608 – June 19, 1615) was a member of the Japanese clan of Toyotomi following the Edo period of the 17th century. Kunimatsu was famed for being the son of Toyotomi Hideyori, who was the son of Toyotomi Hideyoshi. His mother was Hideyori's concubine, Icha (伊茶). (Note: There is a speculation that Kunimatsu's mother was a daughter of a certain Narita Gohei (成田 五兵衛), member of the Narita clan of Ise--retainers of the Hōjō clan of Odawara, but she was more likely a daughter of one man named Watanabe Gohei (渡辺 五兵衛).) His Dharma name was Rōseiin Unsan Chisai Daidōji (漏世院雲山智西大童子).

In 1615, during the Siege of Osaka, Hideyori was defeated and committed suicide by seppuku, while his castle was taken by the forces of Tokugawa Hidetada and Tokugawa Ieyasu. Kunimatsu, who was seven years of age at the time, was captured by Tokugawa forces, and was later executed by decapitation.

== Survival theories ==
Theories and rumors in Japan say he could have escaped through some secret tunnel, and Tokugawa then set up an execution of a decoy or body double (known as a kagemusha), to make official the extinction of Toyotomi's bloodline. He continued to live as Kinoshita Nobuyoshi, the founder of a new branch of the Kinoshita clan (Hideyoshi's birth clan) in Bungo Province after the Shimazu clan were moved to the Satsuma Domain. (Note: Officially, Nobuyoshi was a great-nephew of Hideyoshi's principal wife, Kōdai-in, and the fourth son of Kinoshita Nobutoshi, the first lord of the Hide Domain. Despite sharing the same surname, that Kinoshita family shared no known kinship to Hideyoshi, except for a marital bond: Nobutoshi's father, Iesada, was Kōdai-in's brother and his mother, Unshō-in, was her cousin.)
