= Toyotomi Hideyori =

Japanese samurai (1593–1615)

- 豊臣 秀頼
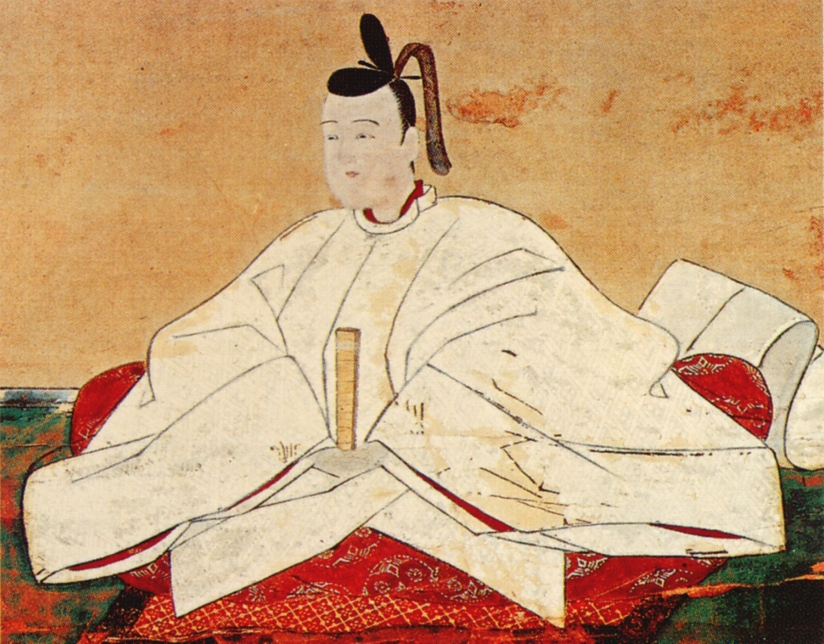

Head of Toyotomi clan
- In office 1598–1615
- Preceded by: Toyotomi Hideyoshi

Personal details
- Born: August 28, 1593
- Died: June 4, 1615 (aged 21) Osaka Castle
- Spouse: Senhime
- Children: Toyotomi Kunimatsu; Tenshūin; Toyotomi Motomaru; Toyotomi Tokimaru
- Parents: Toyotomi Hideyoshi (father); Yodo-dono (mother)
- Relatives: Tokugawa Hidetada (father-in-law); Tokugawa Ieyasu (grandfather-in-law); Toyotomi Hidenaga (uncle); Toyotomi Hidetsugu (cousin); Nene (stepmother); Azai Nagamasa (grandfather); Oichi (grandmother); Ohatsu (aunt); Oeyo (aunt)

Military service
- Allegiance: Toyotomi clan
- Commands: Osaka Castle
- Battles/wars: Siege of Osaka

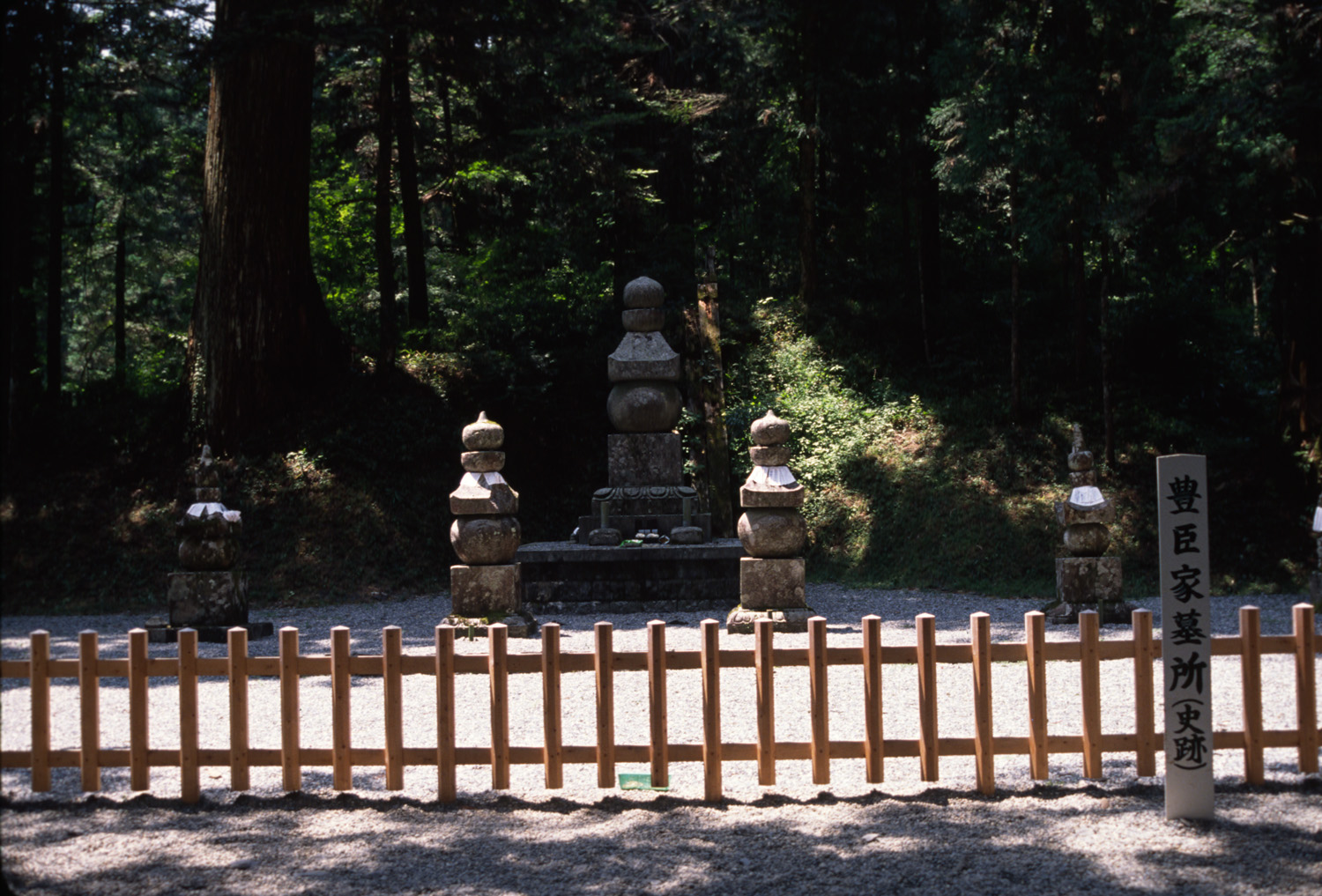
Grave of Toyotomi Clan at Mount Kōya

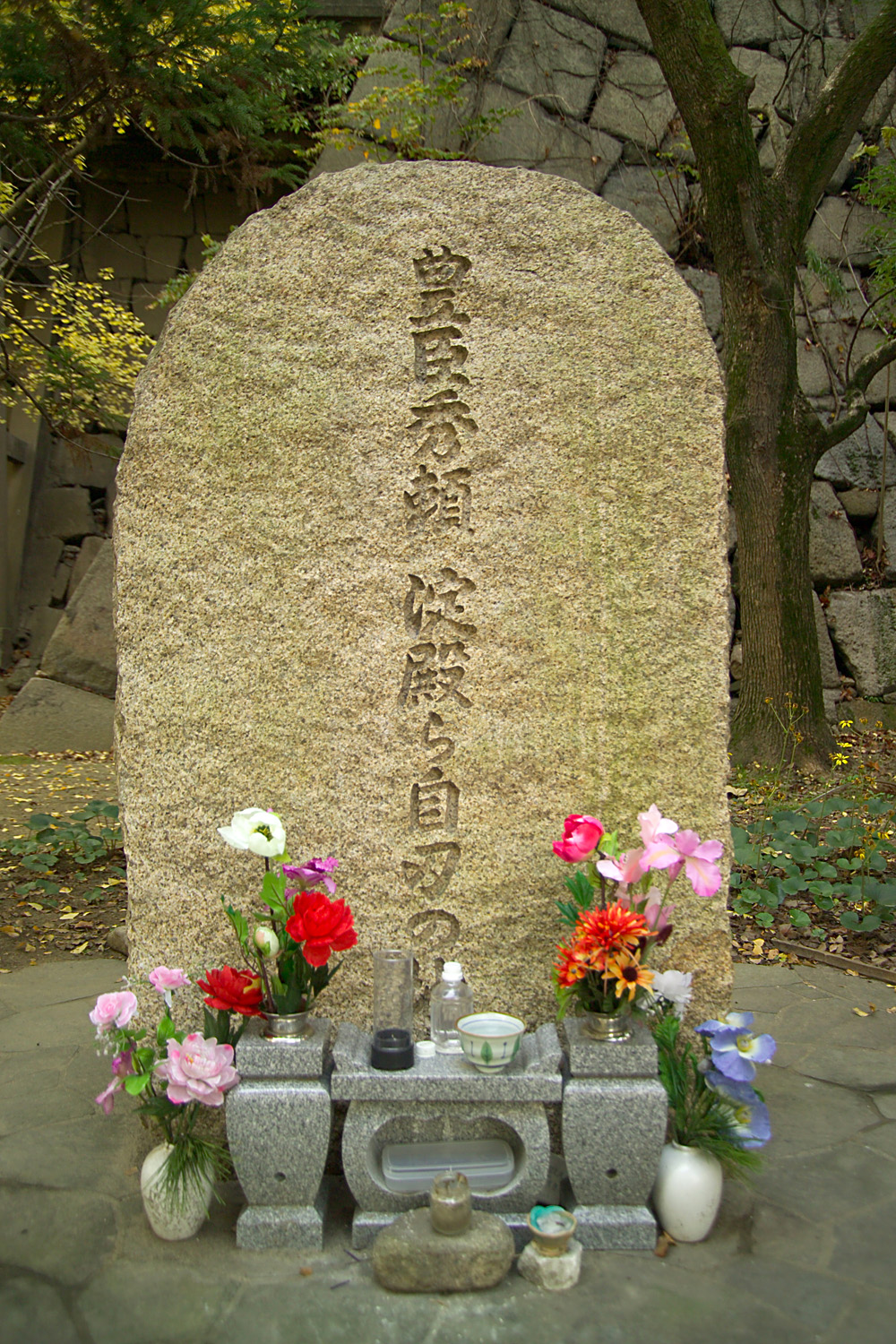
Marker at the location of suicide of Hideyori and Yodo-dono, Osaka Castle

Toyotomi Hideyori (豊臣 秀頼; August 28, 1593 – June 4, 1615) was the son and designated successor of Toyotomi Hideyoshi, the general who united all of Japan toward the end of the Sengoku period. His mother, Yodo-dono, was the niece of Oda Nobunaga.

== Early life ==
Born in 1593, he was Hideyoshi's second son. The birth of Hideyori created a potential succession problem. To avoid it, Hideyoshi exiled his nephew and heir Hidetsugu to Mount Kōya and then ordered him to commit seppuku in August 1595. Hidetsugu's family members who did not follow his example were then murdered in Kyoto, including 31 women and several children and also Mogami Yoshiaki's daughter. Hideyoshi refused to spare the life of Yoshiaki's daughter, who had only just arrived in Kyoto to become Hidetsugu's concubine and had not yet even met her future husband.

When Hideyoshi died in 1598, the five regents he had appointed to rule in Hideyori's place began jockeying amongst themselves for power. Tokugawa Ieyasu seized control in 1600, after his victory over the others at the Battle of Sekigahara. Hideyori's arranged marriage to Senhime, the seven-year-old granddaughter of Ieyasu, was designed to mitigate Toyotomi clan dissension and plotting. In this period, the eight-year-old boy practiced calligraphy with phrases wishing for peace throughout the world.

Fourteen years later, Hideyori was now a young daimyō living in Osaka Castle, son and rightful heir to Toyotomi Hideyoshi. However, Tokugawa Ieyasu continued to view the young Hideyori as a potential threat. Many samurai who opposed Ieyasu rallied around Hideyori, claiming that he was the rightful ruler of Japan.

== Conflict with Ieyasu ==
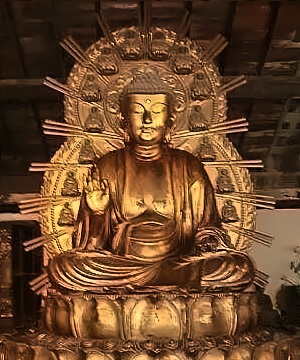
Replica of the Great Buddha of Kyoto

Ieyasu found fault with the opening ceremony of a temple (Great Buddha of Kyoto) built by Hideyori, claiming that a temple bell inscription invoked a curse wishing for Ieyasu's death and the ruin of the Tokugawa clan. Ieyasu ordered Hideyori to leave Osaka Castle, but those in the castle refused and summoned samurai to gather within the castle. Then in 1614, the Tokugawa besieged Osaka Castle against Hideyori.

=== Siege of Osaka ===
Tokugawa forces led by Shogun Tokugawa Hidetada attacked Hideyori in the Siege of Osaka in the winter of 1614, known as "the winter Siege of Osaka". The attack failed, but Hideyori was induced to sign a truce and dismantle the defenses of his stronghold at Osaka Castle.

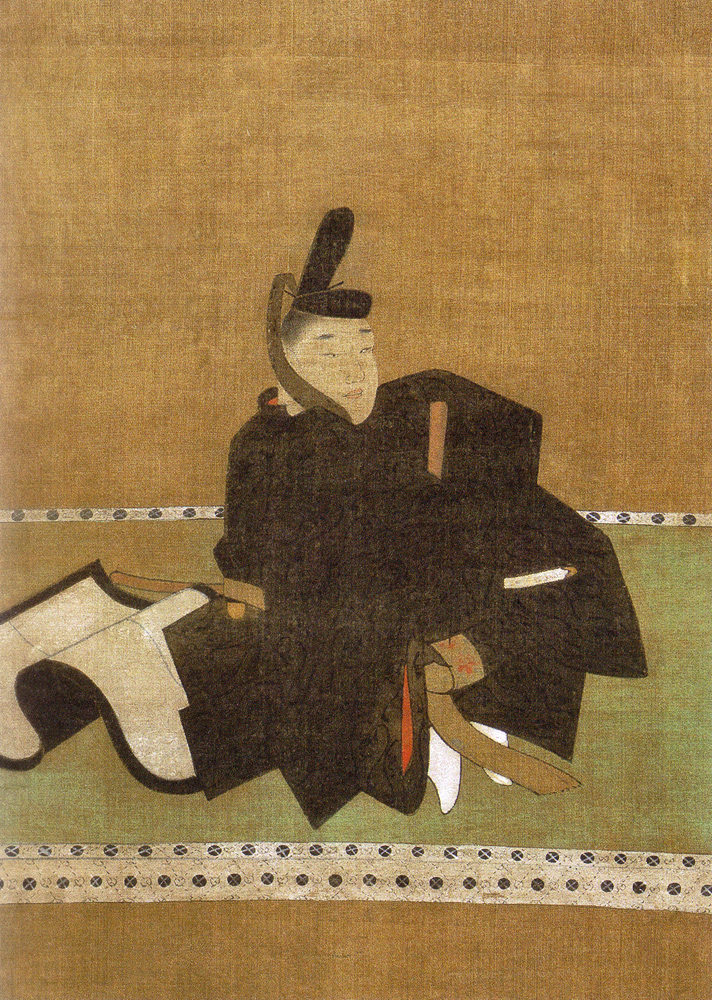
Portrait of Hideyori.

In April 1615, Ieyasu received word that Toyotomi Hideyori was gathering even more troops than in the previous November, and that he was trying to stop the filling of the moat of Osaka Castle. Toyotomi forces began to attack contingents of the shōgun's forces near Osaka. On June 5, 1615, Tokugawa attacked Osaka Castle, an attack known as "the summer Siege of Osaka". As Toyotomi's forces began to lose the battle, a smaller force led directly by Hideyori sallied forth from Osaka Castle too late, and was chased right back into the castle by the advancing enemies. There was no time to set up a proper defense of the castle, and it was soon set ablaze and pummeled by artillery fire. Hideyori and his mother committed seppuku, and the final major uprising against Tokugawa rule for another 250 or so years was put to an end. His widow remarried but later became a Buddhist nun.

== Death ==
According to James Murdoch's A History of Japan During The Century of Early Foreign Discourse, based heavily upon the works of many Japanese sources (the Nihon Shoki, Miyoshi-Ki, and many more) as well as heavily based on the writings of the Jesuits, their annual letters, the letters of William Adams and the diaries of Adams' Dutch comrades, the events of Hideyori's death and the final fall of Osaka Castle were as such – Sanada Yukimura had been tactician of the climactic battle outside the gates of Osaka. Recognizing that they had a serious numerical disadvantage, they decided to attempt a tactic of inducing surprise and confusion in the Tokugawa camp. This was to be effected by first, Osaka captain Akashi Morishige getting behind the Tokugawa van, which would then be taken with Akashi's surprise attack, fall on Akashi, allowing Sanada with his troops and Mōri Katsunaga, who was in charge of the Osaka rōnin, to fall into the Tokugawa front. When the confusion was to be at its height, Hideyori would have marched out of Osaka castle with his home troops and would in theory be the final blow to the Tokugawas.

What happened, according to Murdoch, was that Akashi was not able to get behind the Tokugawa troops, having been discovered and engaged before he emerged from the lanes. The plans fell apart as Mōri's rōnin, ever eager to fight, began shooting at the Tokugawa ranks, not waiting for Sanada (who was serving as Commander of the battle, in addition to being the tactician of the battle) to command them to do so. Sanada at once told the rōnin to stop but they only doubled their efforts. Mōri Katsunaga, deciding to take advantage of his rōnin's eagerness, then decided to launch them forward nevertheless. Upon this, Sanada realized in order to keep any structure of his original plan, he too, would need to engage alongside the rōnin. He decided then to launch himself alongside Katsunaga's force, straight into the Tokugawas, while dispatching a messenger to Hideyori to march out at that very moment instead of a bit further on as had been decided in the plan.

Hideyori began moving with his troops to leave Osaka. Meanwhile, the Osaka troops had been doing quite well in spite of the numerical disadvantage. It has even been said, in Murdoch's book, as he goes to show in an extract from a missionaries letter regarding the event (there were several inside Osaka castle at this point) that the Osaka assault was actually quite successful and drove the Tokugawa back quite promptly. The plan to confuse the Tokugawa forces worked; according to the Jesuits, Ieyasu himself—serving as the ultimate reinforcement to the center—told his men to kill him if victory seemed nigh. Not only did the Jesuits write this, but, in another account, Murdoch states that Ieyasu had at least for some time had designs of seppuku because victory seemed to be escaping him.

According to Siebold, at this critical moment, as Hideyori was leaving Osaka to enter the fray, Ieyasu sent forth into Osaka the son of Osaka captain Ōno Harunaga who had been a hostage to the Tokugawa. Ōno Harunaga's son entered the castle and immediately dispatched a letter from Ieyasu to his father. The letter said "Do not let Hideyori leave the castle. In the castle is a conspiracy and as soon as Hideyori leaves it he will be attacked from the rear." It is because of this letter, according to Siebold, that Hideyori's portion of the plan miscarried. He was just about to leave when he was brought word of its contents, and at this point, stalled in entering the fray.

Eventually, despite the ferocity and initial victories of the Osaka troops, the numerical advantage of the Tokugawa forces proved too much. According to the Nihon Senshi:

"Hideyori, when he received intelligence of the defeat of his rōnin, said, "Death is what I have been ready to meet for long", and was about to sally from the castle in order to fight his very last battle when he was stopped by Hayami, one of his seven captains, who urged that a commander-in-chief should not expose his person among the promiscuous dead. Let Hideyori defend the castle to the last; when it fell, it would be time to take a decision!"

And amidst the ensuing chaos, Hideyori fell back. The castle was fired and general chaos ensued. This Hayami, one of his seven captains, eventually led Hideyori, his wife, the daughter of the shōgun and granddaughter of Ieyasu, and his mother, Yodogimi to a fire proof keep in the castle. From here, Hideyori's wife, the daughter of the shōgun, left to beg of her father and grandfather to spare Hideyori. According to Murdoch, when she finally reached the shōgun, Hidetada, he had remarked coldly to her, "Why don't you die with your husband?" which was customary. However, Ieyasu feigned compassion and instructed Tokugawa captains Ii and Ando to see to Hideyori's safe retreat.

Hideyori, however, remained in the fire-proof keep with his mother and, having sent dispatches to Ieyasu and Hidetada, waited for a response. He was given none and, upon his fire-proof keep being fired upon by the forces of Ii and Ando, allegedly then committed ritual suicide and the keep was destroyed.

Although Ii had been tasked with seeing to Hideyori's safe retreat, when, shortly after, Ii had reported the affairs to Ieyasu and told of his exceeding the orders he'd been given and, thereupon asked Ieyasu to punish him accordingly, according to Murdoch's book, Ieyasu merely nodded without saying anything and Ii left Ieyasu's presence. Not but a few weeks later Ii received a raise on his revenue at Hikone, in Omi, the sum going from 180,000 koku to 230,000 koku and still, later on, in 1617 to 280,000 koku.

== Survival myths ==
Hideyori's actual corpse was never discovered, and a popular rumor persisted that Hideyori had escaped Osaka. The rumors had enough merit to concern the Tokugawa shogunate, according to Murdoch. The matter was serious enough that it found mention in the journals of Richard Cocks, the comrade of William Adams. The following extracts from Cocks' journal explain the matter at hand:

"September 18th, 1616

Capt. Adames went againe to the Cort [at Yedo] to procure our dispatch, and found all the Council busied about matters of justice of life and death; and amongst the rest, one man was brought in question about Fidaia Samme [Hideyori], as being in the castle with him to the last hour. This man was racked and tormented very much, to make him confess where his master was, or whether he were alive or dead; but I cannot hear whether he confessed anything or no."

"May 5th, 1616

The son of Tuan Dono of Langasaque [ Nagasaki ] [i.e the brother of the Japanese Jesuit killed at the storming of Osaka], departed to sea with 13 barkes laden with soldiers to take the island Taccasange, called per them soe, but by us Isla Fermosa. And it is reported he is at Goto, staying for more succors which are to come from Miaco, and thought they mean to go for Lequea [Loochoo], to look for Fidaia Samme [Hideyori]."

"July 7th, 1616

Speeches given out that the Tono, or King, of Xaxma [ Satsuma ] meaneth to make wars against the new Emperor [Hidetada] in right of Fidaia Samme [Hideyori], whom they report to be alive, and that he meaneth to begyn with Langasaque. This is now the common report."

"October 15th, 1616

And it is said Fidaia Samme is alive; but what will come hereof I know not."

Hideyori's son, Kunimatsu (age 8) was captured and beheaded; his daughter Naahime (Princess Naa) (age 7) was sent to Tōkei-ji, a convent in Kamakura, where she later became the twentieth abbess Tenshūin (1608–1645).

== Family tree ==
Tokugawa Ieyasu	Azai Nagamasa	Oichi	Oda Nobunaga
Tokugawa Hidetada	Oeyo	Ohatsu	Yodo-dono	Toyotomi Hideyoshi	One
Tokugawa Iemitsu	Senhime	Toyotomi Hideyori

== Family ==
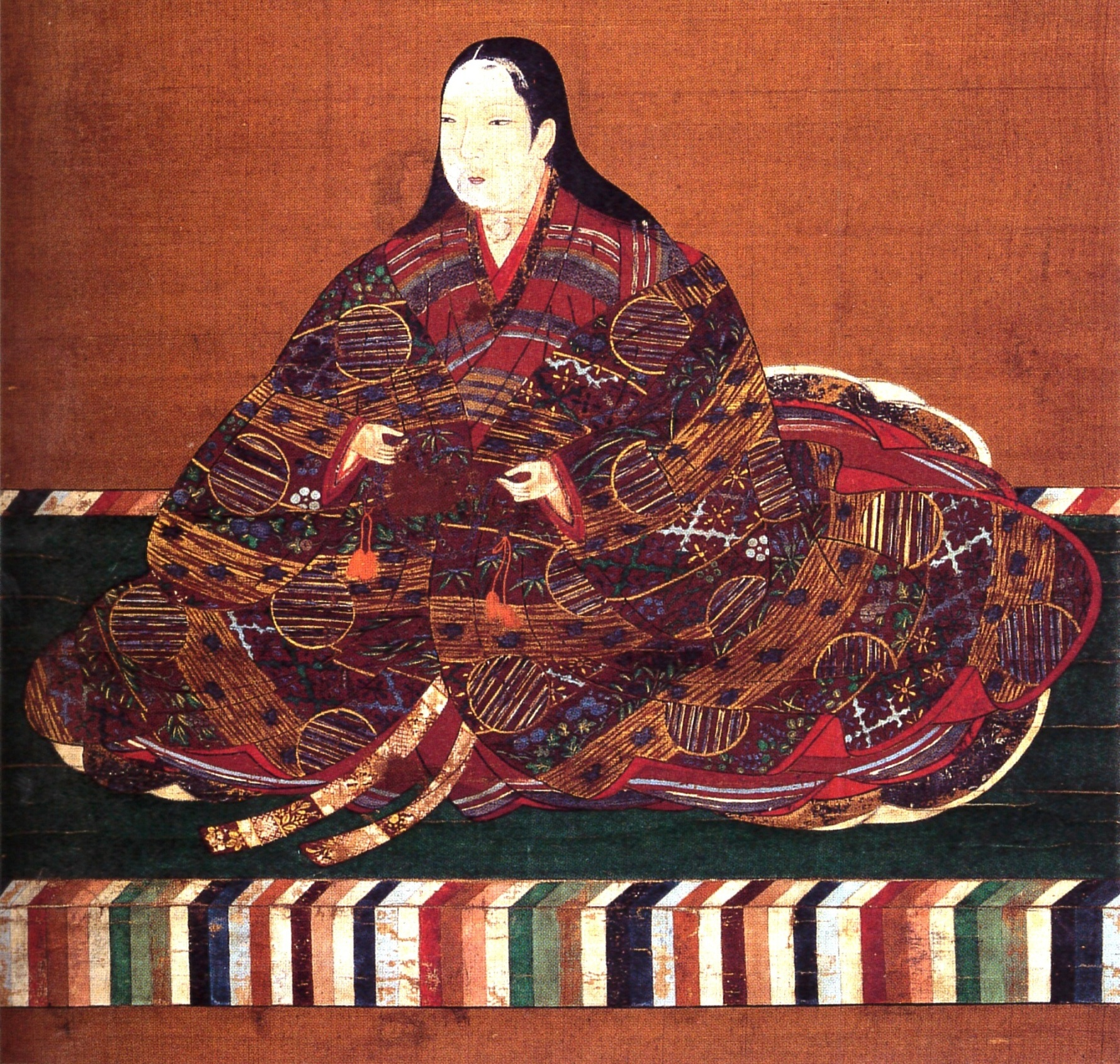
Portrait of Yodo-dono

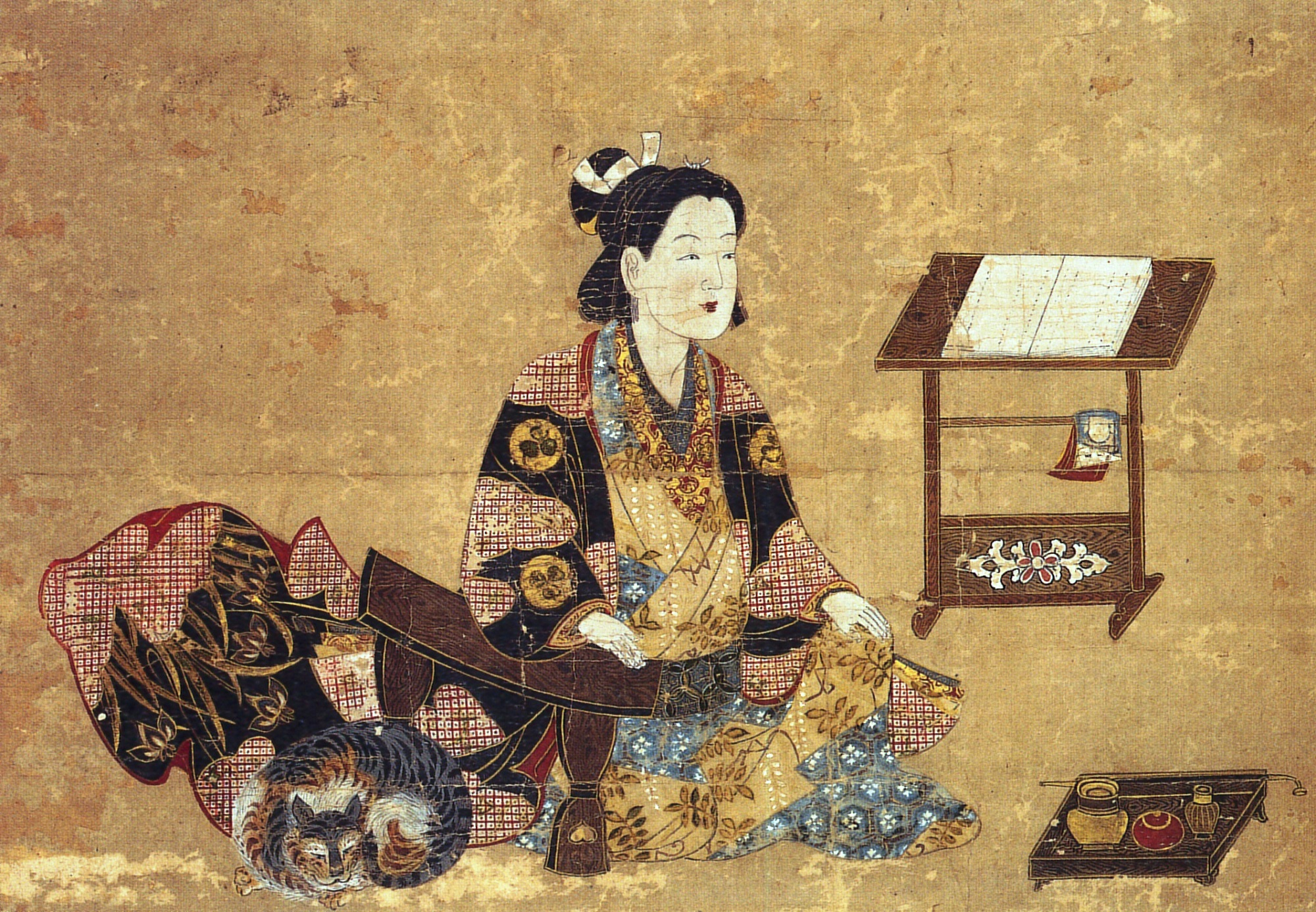
Portrait of Senhime

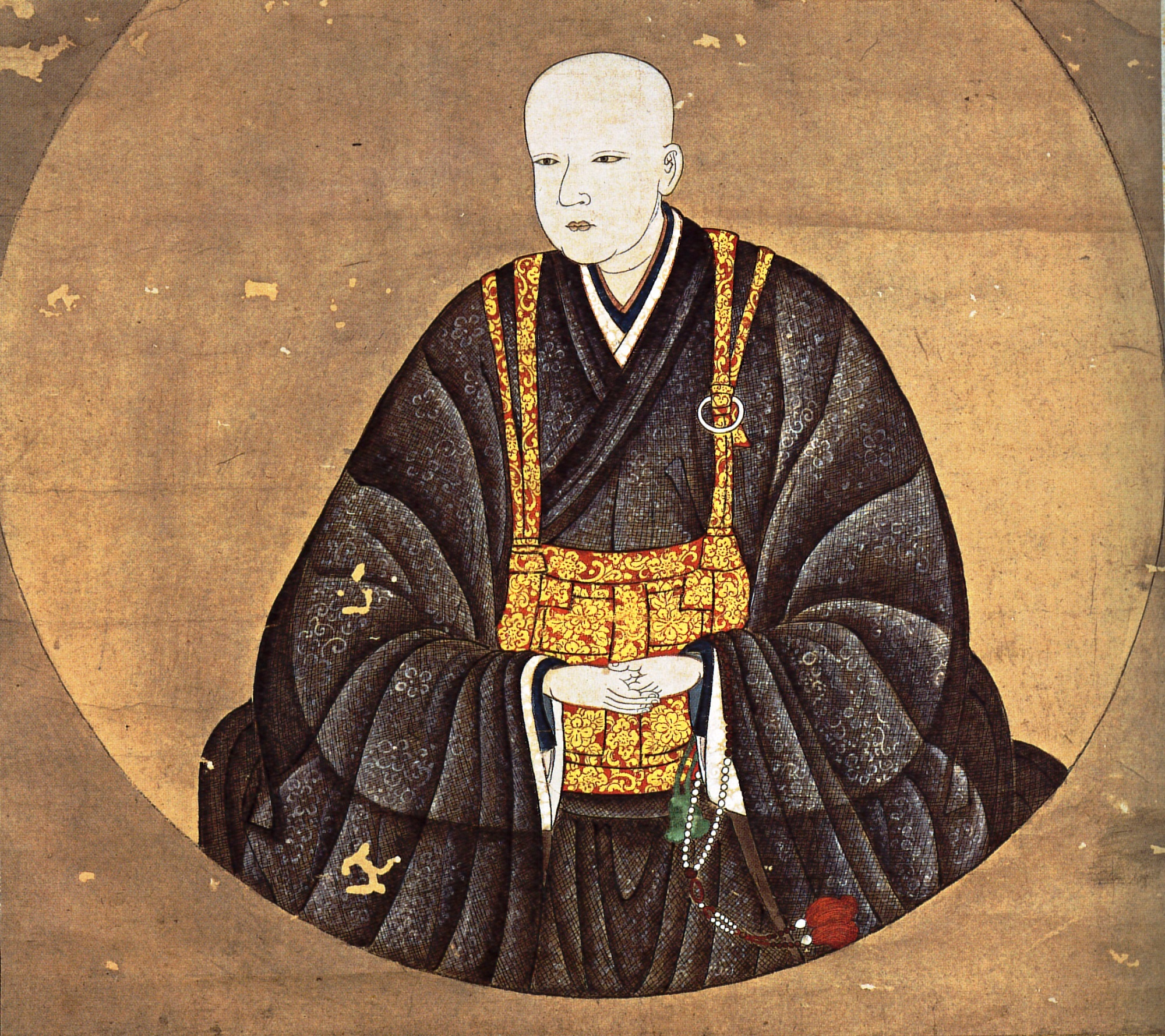
Tenshu-ni

- Father: Toyotomi Hideyoshi (1537–1598)
- Mother: Yodo-dono (1569–1615)
- Wife: Senhime (1597–1666)
- Concubines:
  - Icha no Kata
  - Oiwa no Kata, daughter of Narita Goheisukenao
  - Okogo no Tsubone
- Children:
  - Toyotomi Kunimatsu (1608–1615) by Owaki no Kata
  - Tenshūni (1609–1645) by Oiwa no Kata
  - Toyotomi Motomaru (d. 1688) by Icha no Kata
  - Toyotomi Tokimaru

== See also ==
- Hōkoku Shrine (Osaka)
