= Siege of Ōtsu =

1600 battle in Japan

- Part of the Sengoku period
Date	1600
Location	Ōtsu, near Kyoto
Result	Mōri victory
Territorial changes	Castle falls to Western forces

Belligerents
Western forces; forces of Mōri Terumoto	Eastern forces; castle garrison loyal to Tokugawa Ieyasu

Commanders and leaders
Kobayakawa Hidekane; Tachibana Muneshige; Tsukushi Hirokado	Kyōgoku Takatsugu

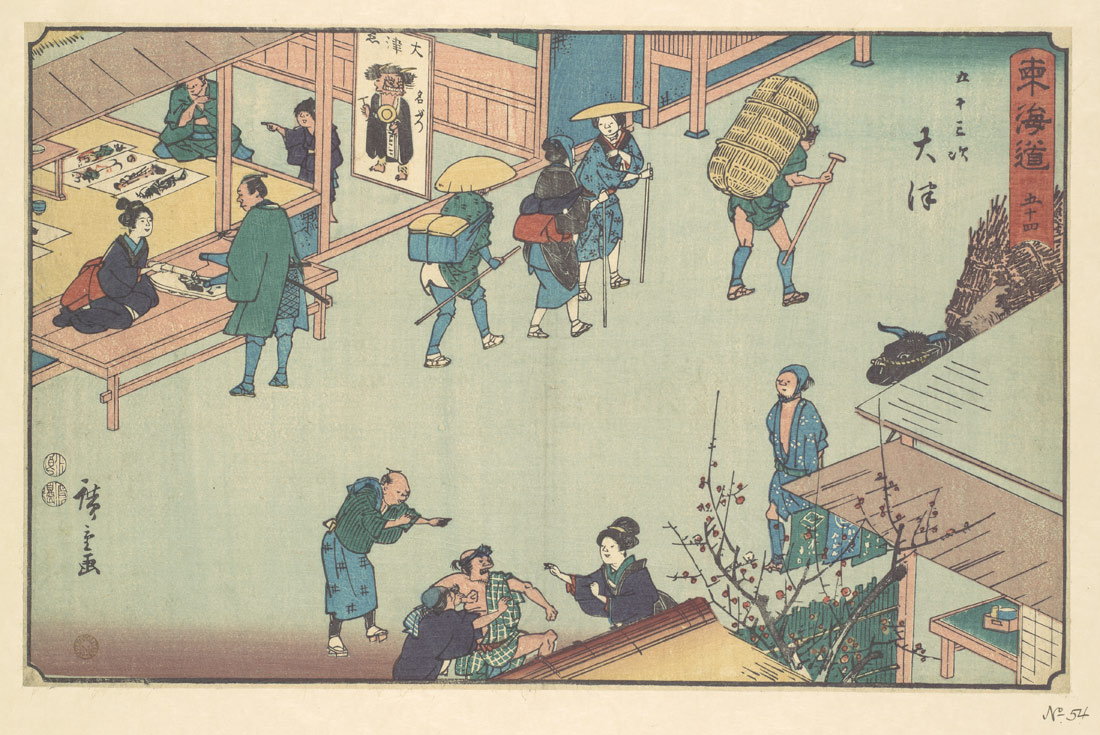
Depiction of Otsu in the 1600's

The siege of Ōtsu (大津城の戦い, Ōtsu-jō no tatakai) took place in 1600, concurrent with the battle of Sekigahara. Kyōgoku Takatsugu held Ōtsu castle for the Tokugawa, and commanded the garrison.

Mōri Terumoto, Tachibana Muneshige, and roughly 15,000 troops laid siege. The sides negotiated and Takatsugu surrendered. However, in the meantime Tokugawa Ieyasu had won the battle of Sekigahara, assuring his control of all Japan, and so the loss of Ōtsu was ultimately insignificant.

Some records of the time indicate that the local inhabitants brought picnic boxes and gathered at Mii-dera on Mount Hiei to observe the battle.

== Historicity ==
According to the records from "History of Yamaguchi Prefecture", and 56 documents from the "Documents of the Asa Mori Family, Sanyo Town Asa Library", Mōri Terumoto dispatched Kobayakawa Hidekane and Tachibana Muneshige from Hekiteikan as reinforcements for Mōri Motoyasu's army to capture Ōtsu Castle, which surrounded by a double moat and defended by Kyogoku Takatsugu, Tokugawa Hidetada's brother-in-law. On the 12 September, when Hidetsugu and Muneshige's reinforcements arrived, they held a military council and decided to launch an all-out attack on the 13 September. At dawn, they began a moat-crossing operation to fill in the outer moat on three sides of the castle. According to Hidetsugu's records, "the castle fell in the evening," and Takatsugu surrendered in that day. The "Otsu Castle Memorial Monument" at Koyasan Okunoin is engraved which supported that the castle were fallen on 13 September.

However, according to the official history records of Tokugawa shogunate, the Kyōgoku Takatsugu forces had fought well to defend the for Castle, and only fallen in 14 September. Judging by this contradiction of the records, the history researchers society from Bingo suspected there is an attempt to downplay the achievements of Muneshige and Motoyasu achievement in capturing the castle, to cover the disgraceful fact that Takatsugu, a figure close to the second shogun of Tokugawa clan, beaten easily in the siege. Further indication was stated by the research team representative that despite victory of Muneshige and Motoyasu were nullified as the overall Sekigahara Campaign was won by the Tokugawa side, Takatsugu were transferred somewhere in July 1619 by Hidetada and the governorship of Kannabe was replaced with Mizuno Katsunari. Katsunari was considered by Hidetada as the best person to control the region as he has reputation as strong military general who could help stabilize the Shogunate presence in Bingo Province and keeping the Mōri clan in check.
