= Ohatsu =

Prominently-placed figure in the late Sengoku period

Ohatsu-no-kata お初 Ohatsu
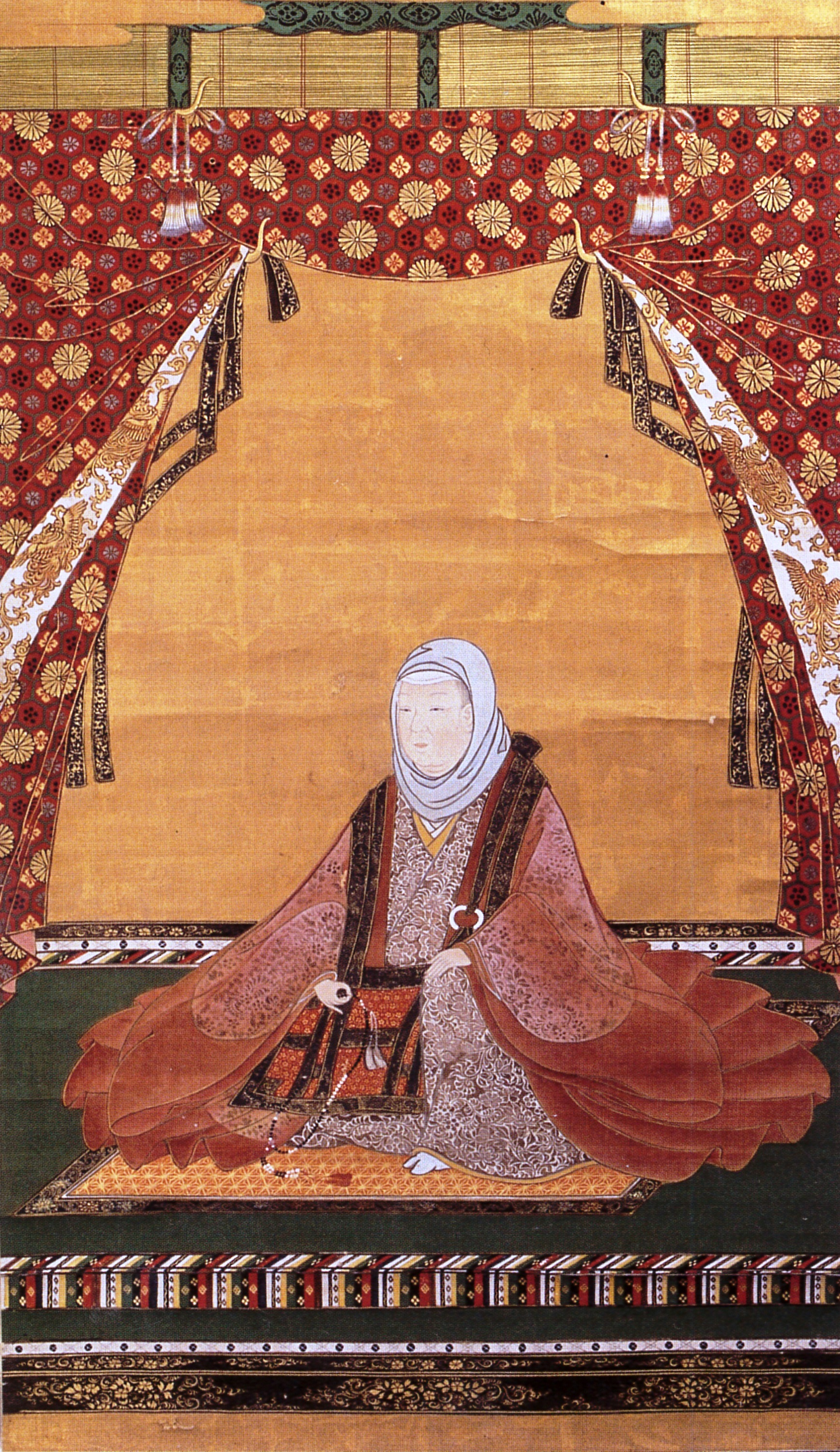
- Born: 1570
- Died: September 30, 1633 (aged 62–63)
- Spouse: Kyōgoku Takatsugu
- Parents: Azai Nagamasa (father); Oichi (mother)
- Family: Azai clan Toyotomi clan Kyōgoku clan

Ohatsu (お初; 1570 – September 30, 1633), also known as Ohatsu-no-kata (お初の方), was a prominently placed figure in the late Sengoku period. She was daughter of Oichi and Nagamasa Azai, and the sister of Yodo-dono and Oeyo. Alongside her sisters, she was active in the political intrigues of her day. Ohatsu's close family ties to both the Toyotomi clan and the Tokugawa clan uniquely positioned her to serve as a conduit between the rivals. She acted as a liaison until 1615 in the siege of Osaka, when the Tokugawa eliminated the Toyotomi.

== Life ==
Ohatsu was the second daughter of Azai Nagamasa. Her mother, Oichi, was the youngest sister of Oda Nobunaga.

Her father died during the siege of Odani in 1573 after rebelling against Nobunaga, and Ohatsu's brother Manpukumaru was killed. With her sisters and her mother, she joined the Oda clan. In 1582, after the assassination of her uncle in Honnō-ji Incident, her mother married Shibata Katsuie, a general in the service of the Oda, and in 1583, Toyotomi Hideyoshi attacked the Kitanosho castle, the castle where Ohatsu lived with her foster father, Katsuie. Her mother died and Hideyoshi took Ohatsu and her sisters under his care.

When she married her cousin Kyōgoku Takatsugu in 1587, he was a daimyō in Ōmi Province, holding Ōtsu Castle for the Toyotomi. At this point, Takatsugu was a fudai daimyō (hereditary vassal) of the Toyotomi with a stipend of 60,000 koku annually. After 1600, Takatsugu's allegiances had been transferred to the Tokugawa; and he was rewarded with the fief of Obama in Wakasa Province and an enhanced income of 92,000 koku annually.

The changing fortunes of her husband affected Ohatsu's life. The registers of luxury goods dealers give an insight into the patronage and tastes of this privileged class. Being sterile, she advised her husband to take a concubine to ensure an heir for the Kyogoku clan, however she adopted her niece, Oeyo's daughter, who would later marry Kyogoku Tadataka, son of Takatsugu.

=== Sekigahara ===
Ohatsu's older sister was Yodo-Dono, also called Chacha. She was the concubine and the second wife of Hideyoshi; and the mother of Toyotomi Hideyori. Yodo-dono received great political power after Hideyoshi's death, because she was the heir's mother, she actually ran the Toyotomi clan after the fall of the Council of five elders. Hideyoshi's death led Japan to go to war again.

Ohatsu's younger sister, Oeyo, also known as Ogō, was the main wife of Shogun Tokugawa Hidetada and the mother of her successor Iemitsu Tokugawa. The Kyogoku clan allied with Tokugawa Ieyasu of Eastern army against Western army in Sekigahara Campaign. The Western army was led by Ishida Mitsunari and other vassals loyal to Toyotomi. Ohatsu was in the castle when the siege of Otsu occurred. Ohatsu and Oeyo were allies of the Eastern Army, their sister, Yodo-dono, was one of the prominent anti-Tokugawa (Eastern army) figures during Sekigahara and later during the siege of Osaka.

=== Siege of Osaka ===
After the death of Ohatsu's husband in 1609, she withdrew from the world at Nozen-zan Jōkō-ji (凌霄山常高寺), A Buddhist convent in Obama (where she is now buried), taking the name Jōkō-in (常高院). However, Ohatsu remained active in the political intrigue of her time. Her family ties with the Toyotomi clan and the Tokugawa clan ensured that she served primarily as an intermediary between the two rivals. In 1614, during the winter campaign of the siege of Osaka, Ohatsu acted again as a peace negotiator and reunited with her sister, Yodo-dono. Although Yodo-dono hated the Tokugawa clan for personal reasons, she was the forerunner of a peace treaty between the Toyotomi and Tokugawa. However, in 1615, the two factions went to war again. When Osaka castle was on fire, Yodo-dono and Toyotomi Hideyori committed suicide, thus ending the Toyotomi's legacy.

=== Death ===
On September 30, 1633, Ohatsu died. Although the Kyōgoku clan moved to Izumo-Matsue a year after Ohatsu's death, her grave remained intact according to her wishes.

== Bibliography ==
- Brinkley, Frank and Dairoku Kikuchi. (1915). A History of the Japanese People from the Earliest Times to the End of the Meiji Era. Chicago: Encyclopædia Britannica Co.OCLC 413099
- Hickman, Money L., John T. Carpenter and Bruce A. Coats. (2002). Japan's Golden Age: Momoyama. New Haven: Yale University Press. ISBN 978-0-300-09407-7; OCLC 34564921
- Papinot, Edmond. (1906) Dictionnaire d'histoire et de géographie du japon. Tokyo: Librarie Sansaisha. Nobiliaire du japon (abridged version of 1906 text).
