= Toyotomi clan =

Japanese noble family (1585–1615)

Toyotomi 豊臣
- The emblem (mon) of the Toyotomi clan
- Home province: Various
- Titles: Kampaku; Daijō-daijin
- Founder: Toyotomi Hideyoshi
- Final ruler: Toyotomi Hideyori
- Founding year: 1585
- Dissolution: 1615
- Ruled until: 1615, Siege of Osaka

Toyotomi clan

Japanese name
- Kana: とよとみうじ or とよとみし
- Kyūjitai: 豐臣氏
- Shinjitai: 豊臣氏
Transcriptions
- Revised Hepburn: Toyotomi-shi or Toyotomi-uji

Mon variant used by Toyotomi Hideyoshi

The Toyotomi clan (Japanese: shinjitai: 豊臣氏 / kyujitai: 豐臣氏, Hepburn: Toyotomi-shi) was a Japanese clan that ruled over the Japanese before the Edo period.

== Unity and conflict ==
The most influential figure within the Toyotomi was Toyotomi Hideyoshi, one of the three "unifiers of Japan". Oda Nobunaga was another primary unifier and the ruler of the Oda clan at the time. Hideyoshi joined Nobunaga at a young age, but was not highly regarded because of his peasant background. Nevertheless, Hideyoshi's increasing influence allowed him to seize a significant degree of power from the Oda clan following Oda Nobunaga's death in 1582. As the virtual ruler of most of Japan, Hideyoshi received the new clan name "Toyotomi" in 1585 from the emperor, and achieved the unification of Japan in 1590.

When Hideyoshi died in 1598, his son Toyotomi Hideyori was only five years old. Five regents were appointed to rule until his maturity, and conflicts among them began quickly. In 1600, Tokugawa Ieyasu deposed Hideyori and took power after winning the Battle of Sekigahara. In 1614, Hideyori came into conflict with the Tokugawa shogunate, leading to Tokugawa Ieyasu's Siege of Osaka from 1614 to 1615. As a result of the siege, Hideyori and his mother, Yodo-dono, committed seppuku in the flames of Osaka castle. After their death, the Toyotomi clan dissolved, leaving the Tokugawa clan to solidify their rule of Japan and the last member of the Toyotomi clan was Tenshuni (1609–1645). A rumor said that Toyotomi Hideyori's son Toyotomi Kunimatsu escaped execution, and another rumor said that Hideyori had an illegitimate son named Amakusa Shirō.

== Other notables ==
- Hashiba Hidekatsu
- Nene
- Ōmandokoro
- Tomo (Toyotomi)
- Toyotomi Hidenaga
- Toyotomi Hidetsugu
- Toyotomi Sadako
- Yodo-dono

== Bibliography ==
- Berry, Mary Elizabeth. (1982). Hideyoshi. Cambridge: Harvard UP, ISBN 9780674390256; OCLC 8195691
- Seiichi Iwao, Teizō Iyanaga, 2002: Dictionnaire historique du Japon, vol. 1, p. 1145. Maisonneuve & Larose
- George Sansom, 1961: A history of Japan, vol. 2 (1334-1615). Stanford University Press
- Chris Spackman, 2009: An Encyclopedia of Japanese History , p. 387. BiblioBazaar, LLC
- William Scott Wilson, 2004: The lone samurai: the life of Miyamoto Musashi, p. 32. Kodansha International
- Eiji Yoshikawa, 1993: Taiko. A. Knaus Verlag: München. ISBN 3813503038
