= Tōkai-ji (Shinagawa) =

Buddhist temple in Shinagawa, Japan

- 東海寺
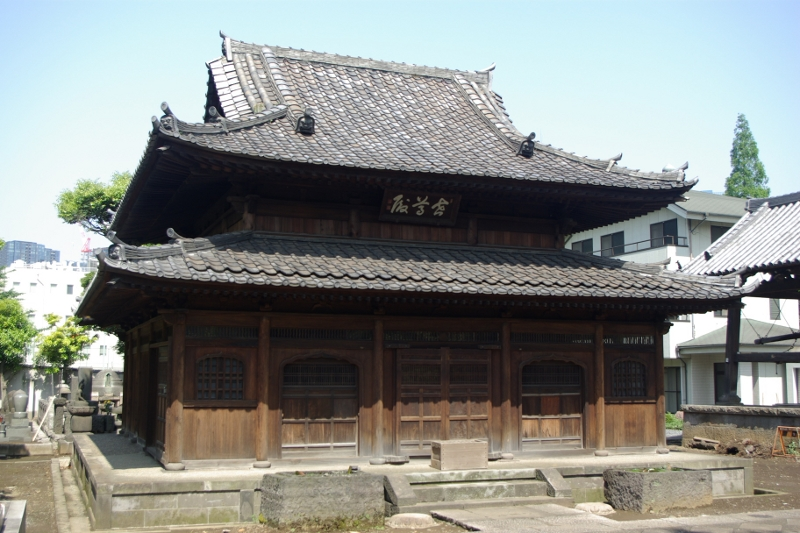
- Tōkai-ji Butsu-dō

- Location within Tokyo Location within Japan

Religion
- Affiliation: Buddhist
- Rite: Rinzai school
- Status: functional

Location
- Location: 3-11-9 Kitashinagawa, Shinagawa-ku, Tokyo-to
- Country: Japan
- Coordinates: 35°36′58.21″N 139°44′20.15″E

Architecture
- Founder: Tokugawa Iemitsu
- Completed: 1639

Website
- Official website

Tōkai-ji (東海寺), is a Buddhist temple located in Shinagawa, Tokyo, Japan. The temple belongs to the Daitoku-ji branch of the Rinzai school of Japanese Zen.

== History ==
Tōkai-ji was established in 1639 under the sponsorship of the Shōgun Tokugawa Iemitsu. Under the Tokugawa shogunate, the government imposed strict regulations on Buddhist temples, and in the case of influential temples such as Daitoku-ji in Kyoto, sought to weaker or break their relationship with the Imperial Court. In the case of Daitoku-ji in particular, it had been tradition that the priesthood was appointed by imperial decree, but now the shogunate declared that such appointments would need to be approved first by the Shogun in Edo. In what later came to be called the "Purple Robe Incident" (紫衣事件, Shie Jiken), in 1627, Emperor Go-Mizunoo awarded the purple robes of priesthood to senior monks at Daitoku-ji. The shogunate promptly declared this action to be illegal and ordered the Kyoto Shoshidai to confiscate the robes. Takuan, a former head abbot of Daitoku-ji, together with the senior priesthood of Daitoku-ji and Myōshin-ji protested this action, and were arrested. They were tried for sedition at Edo Castle in front of Shogun Tokugawa Hidetada and Takuan was banished to Kaminoyama in Dewa Province. In 1632, after the death of Hidetada, a general amnesty was proclaimed. Takuan returned to Daitoku-ji and was received in an audience arranged by Yagyū Munenori and Tenkai in Kyoto by Hidetada's successor, Tokugawa Iemitsu, who was very much impressed by Takuan's intelligence and insights. At Iemitsu's invitation, he returned to Edo, where he gave many lectures to Iemitsu, who eventually rescinded the "Purple Robes decree" in 1641, restoring Daitoku-ji to its original honors. In the meantime, Iemitsu had the temple of Tōkai-ji constructed in Shinagawa at the outskirts of Edo in 1639 especially for Takuan, so that he could draw on Takuan's counsel at any time.

Takuan died in Edo in 1645. In the moments before his death, he wrote the kanji 夢 ("dream"), and laid down his brush. He also left behind a will stating that "no tombstone should be built" and that he should be buried without any ceremony in an unmarked grave. His disciples promptly erected gravestones at the temple of Tōkai-ji and also at the temple of Sōkyō-ji in Izushi. His grave at Tōkai-ji was proclaimed a National Historic Site in 1926.

In 1694, Shinagawa-juku was destroyed by fire. The temple was reconstructed under the sponsorship of Keishō-in, the mother of Shōgun Tokugawa Tsunayoshi. It was expanded during this time, and was granted property with a kokudaka of 5000 koku for its upkeep. The existing temple bell dates from this rebuilding. Following the Meiji restoration, the temple lost much of its property and its cemetery is now separated from the main temple grounds.

The temple is a five minute walk from Shimbamba Station on the Keikyū Main Line.

== Noted burials at Tōkai-ji ==
- Takuan Sōhō, grave is a National Historic Site.
- Kamo no Mabuchi (1697-1769), noted kokugaku scholar, grave is National Historic Site
- Hattori Nankaku (1683-1759), artist and poet
- Shibukawa Shunkai (1639-1715), scholar, astronomer
- Inoue Masaru (1843-1910), Meiji government official and engineer, the "father of the Japanese railways".
- Chiyoko Shimakura (1938-2013), singer and TV presenter

== Gallery ==
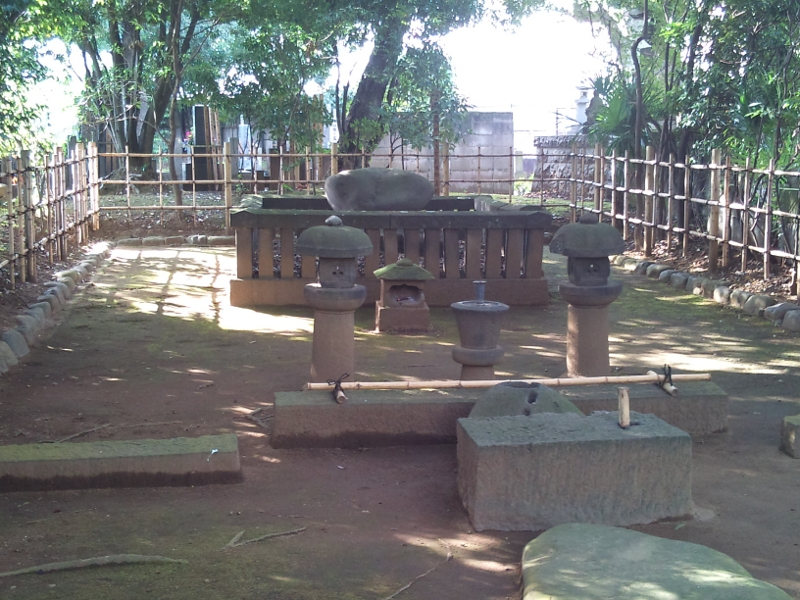
Grave of Takuan Sōhō

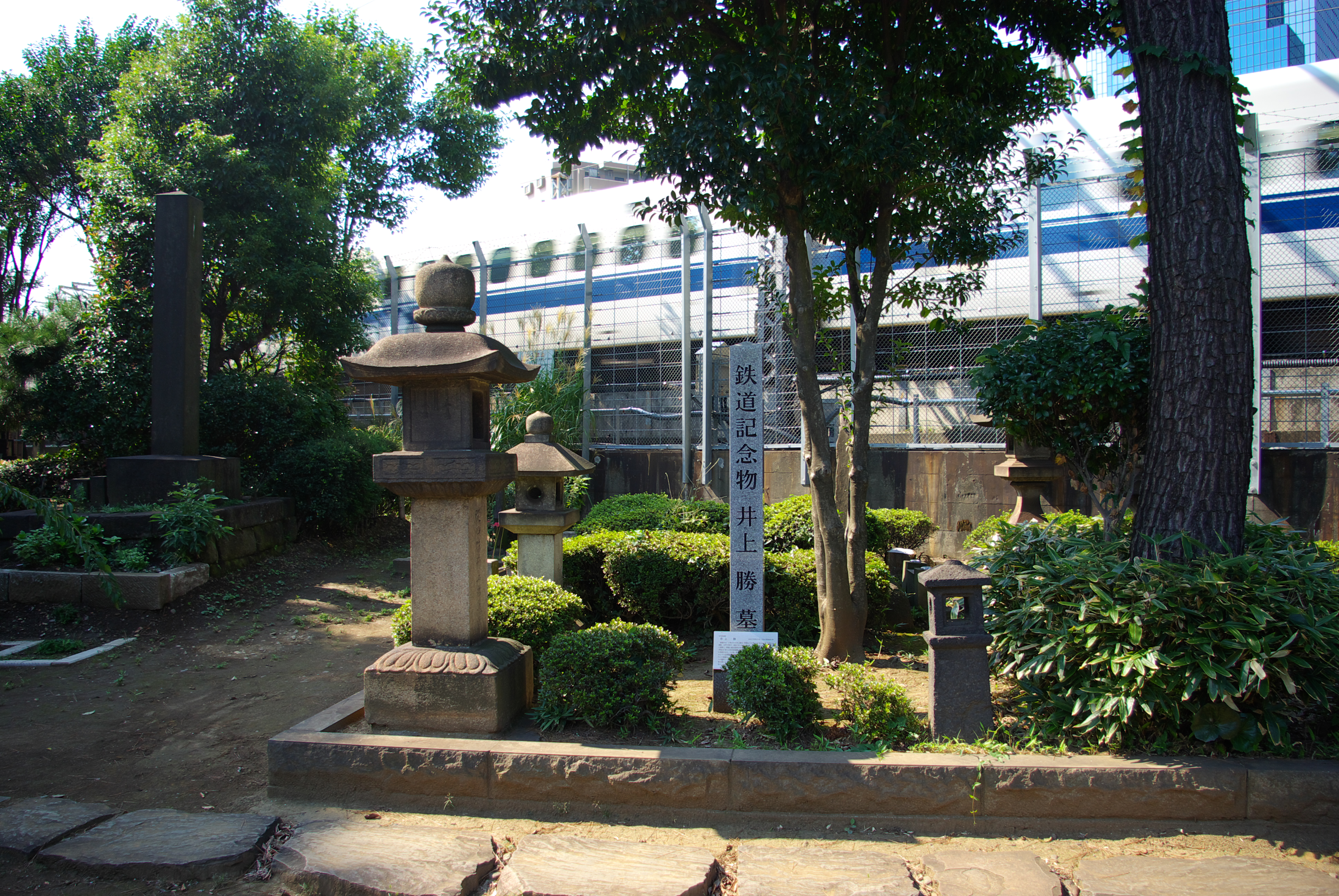
Grave of Inoue Masaru

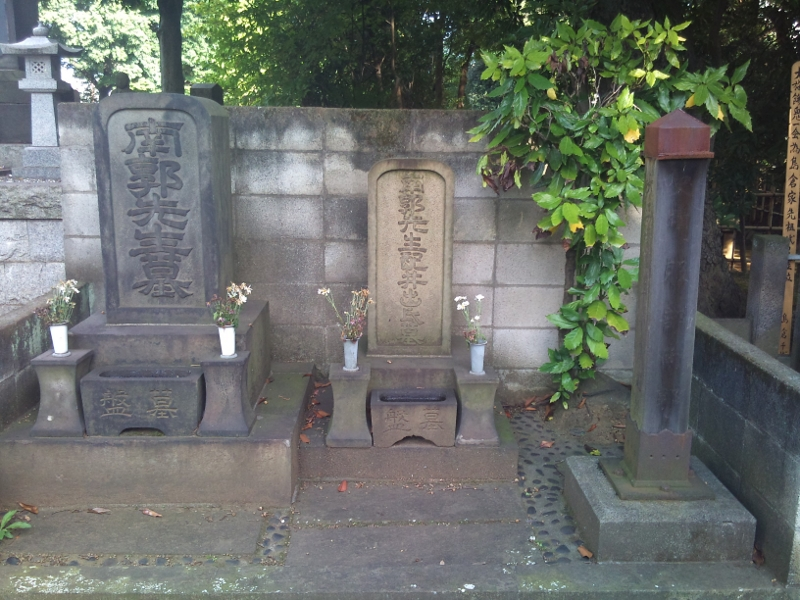
Grave of Hattori Nankaku

== See also ==
- List of Historic Sites of Japan (Tōkyō)
