= Tokugawa Masako =

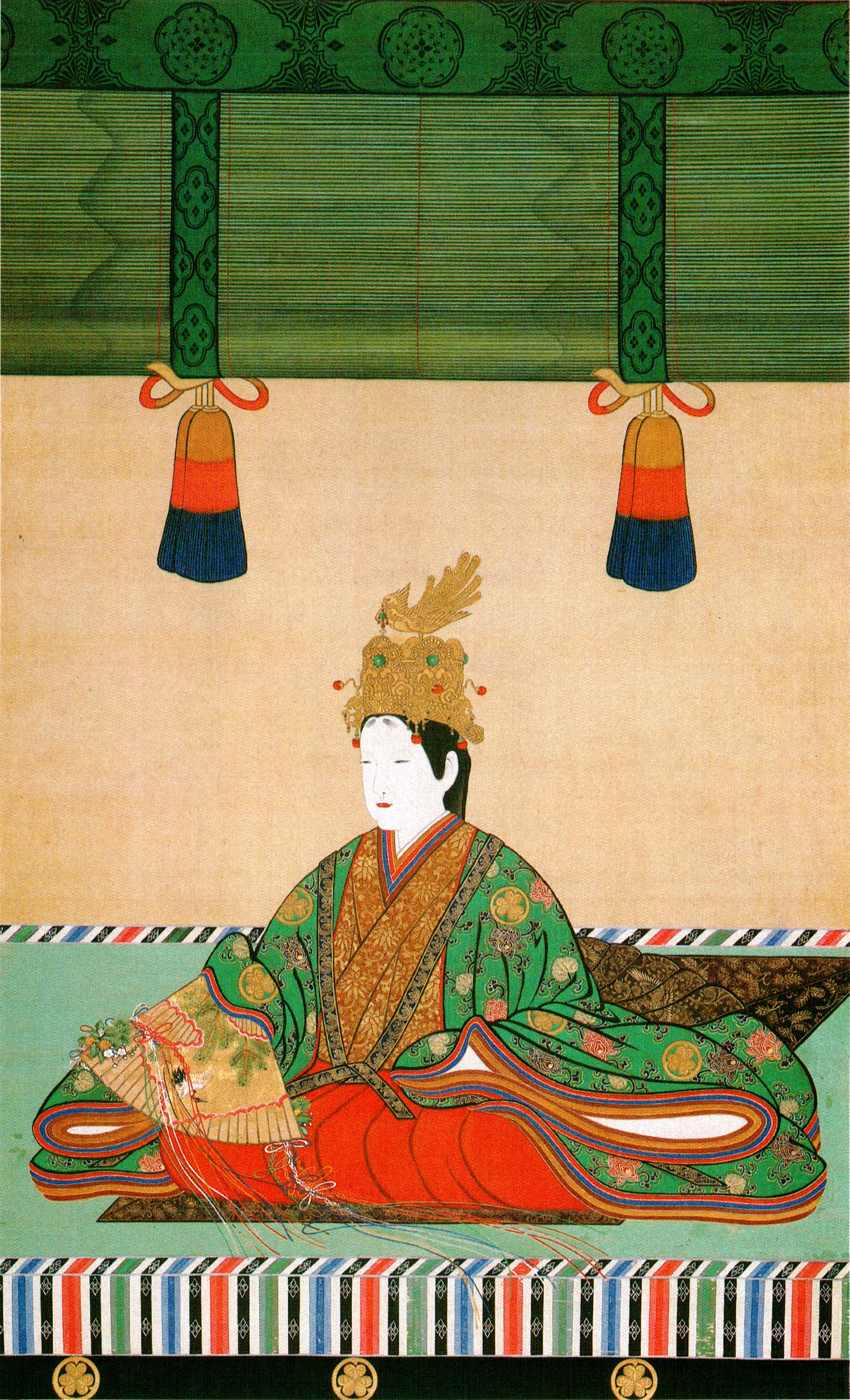

Empress consort of Japan
- Tenure: 1624–1629
- Born: November 23, 1607; Edo Castle
- Died: August 2, 1678 (aged 70); Ōmiya Palace
- Burial: Tsuki no wa no misasagi
- Spouse: Emperor Go-Mizunoo (m. 1620)
- Issue: Empress Meishō; Princess Onna-ni; Prince Sukehito; Prince Waka; Princess Akiko (Go-Mizunoo); Princess Yoshiko; Princess Kiku
- House: Tokugawa clan (by birth); Imperial House of Japan (by marriage)
- Father: Tokugawa Hidetada
- Mother: Oeyo

Tokugawa Masako (徳川 和子; November 23, 1607 – August 2, 1678), also known as Kazu-ko, was empress consort of Japan as the wife of Emperor Go-Mizunoo. Through collaboration with her parents, Oeyo and Shogun Tokugawa Hidetada, she was a prominent and influential figure within the politics and culture of the Edo Period.

== History ==
- 1620 (Genna 6): Masako entered the palace as a consort of Emperor Go-Mizunoo. Although there was already a concubine for Go-Mizunoo, the marriage to Masako was celebrated with great pomp.
- 1624: Masako was granted the title of chūgū (中宮), indicating that she was a legitimate wife and therefore an established Empress Consort. She is the first consort to hold this title since the reign of Emperor Go-Hanazono.
- 1629: When the Emperor Go-Mizunoo abdicated in 1629, Masako took the title and name of Tōfukumon-in (東福門院).

In a rare break with tradition, Masako's daughter, Imperial Princess Onna-Ichi-no-miya Okiko, succeeded her father in her own right as Empress Meishō, albeit at the age of five. After Meishō abdicated at 19, the throne would be successively held by two of her half-brothers, who would reign as Emperor Go-Kōmyō and Emperor Go-Sai respectively. Both had been brought up by Masako as if they were her own sons.

Masako had two younger daughters; Princess Teruko (1625-1651) who married Konoe Hisatsugu, and Princess Akiko (1629-1675), also known as the Third Princess.

== Achievements ==
Masako used her wealth to bring together the two capitals of Edo and Kyoto, as well as helping to maintain the high standards of the court. Her money was also used to restore significant buildings that had been damaged in the preceding civil wars. Many of these restorations were originally credited to her brother Iemitsu, or her husband, but have recently been properly credited to her. Masako also presented herself as a representative of the Tokugawa clan, although the high standards expected from this position may have got her into trouble. According to tradition, Masako and Lady Kasuga broke a taboo by visiting the Imperial court dressed as commoners. The event is said to have highly embarrassed Go-Mizunoo, who promptly abdicated and named Meisho as empress. It is perhaps more likely, though, that Go-Mizunoo abdicated due to the fallout over the "Purple Robe Incident", which had caused a serious political conflict between him and Tokugawa Iemitsu, the new Shogun. Whatever the actual reasons, Meishō's elevation made Iemitsu, as Masako's brother, the uncle of the sitting monarch.

== Family ==
- Father: Tokugawa Hidetada (1581-1632)
- Mother: Oeyo (1573-1626)
- Husband: Emperor Go-Mizunoo (1596-1680)
- Children:
  - Princess Okiko (女一宮興子内親王, Onna-ichi-no-miya Okiko Naishinnō; 9 January 1624 – 4 December 1696), became Empress Meishō
  - Princess Onna-ni (女二宮, Onna-ni-no-miya; 14 October 1625 – 2 July 1651) married Konoe Hisatsugu
  - Prince Sukehito (高仁親王, Sukehito Shinnō; 31 December 1626 – 11 July 1628)
  - Prince Waka (若宮, Waka-no-miya; 1628)
  - Princess Akiko (女三宮昭子内親王, Onna-San-no-miya Akiko Naishinnō; 13 October 1629 — 18 June 1675)
  - Princess Yoshiko (女五宮賀子内親王, Onna-Go-no-Miya Yoshiko Naishinnō; 21 July 1632 – 2 August 1696) married Nijō Mitsuhira
  - Princess Kiku (菊宮, Kiku-no-miya; 1633–1634)
- Adopted:
  - Emperor Go-Kōmyō
  - Emperor Go-Sai

== Interests ==
- Empress Masako was a patron of the arts. She collected antiques as well as contemporary art. She was also skilled at calligraphy and dabbled in poetry.

== Notes ==
Japanese royalty
Preceded by Unknown empress of Emperor Chōkei (last known empress: Princess Junshi)	Empress consort of Japan; 1624–1629	Succeeded by Fujiwara no Fusako
