= Mitsuhira =

Mitsuhira (written: 三平) is a Japanese surname. Notable people with the surname include:

- Kazushi Mitsuhira (三平 和司, born 1988), Japanese footballer

Mitsuhira (written: 光平) is also a masculine Japanese given name. Notable people with the name include:

- Nijō Mitsuhira (二条 光平, 1624–1682), Japanese kugyō
