= Kan'ei =

Period of Japanese history (1624–1644)

Kan'ei (寛永) was a Japanese era name (年号, nengō; "year name") after Genna and before Shōhō. This period spanned the years from April 17, 1624 through January 13, 1645 in the Gregorian calendar. The reigning emperors and single empress were Go-Mizunoo-tennō (後水尾天皇), Meishō-tennō (明正天皇) and Go-Kōmyō-tennō (後光明天皇).

== Change of era ==
- 1624 Kan'ei gannen (寛永元年): The era name was changed to mark the start of a new cycle of the Chinese zodiac. The previous era ended and a new one commenced in Genna 9, on the 30th day of the 2nd month. This era name is derived from 寛広、永長 (meaning "Broad Leniency, Eternal Leader").

== Events ==
- 1624 (Kan'ei 1): Construction of the Hōei-zan temple began.
- November 4, 1626 (Kan'ei 3, 16th day of the 9th month): Emperor Go-Mizunoo and the empress visited Nijō Castle; they were accompanied by Princes of the Blood, palace ladies and kuge. Among the precedents for this was the Tenshō era visit of Emperor Go-Yōzei to Toyotomi Hideyoshi's extravagant Heian-kyō mansion, Juraku-dai (which Hideyoshi himself would tear down in the 12th month of Bunroku 2).
- 1626 (Kan'ei 3): The first Kan'ei Tsūhō (寛永通寳) cash coins were introduced in the Mito Domain.
- 1629 (Kan'ei 6): The "Purple Robe Incident" (紫衣事件,, shi-e jiken)—the Emperor was accused of having bestowed honorific purple garments to more than ten priests despite the shōgun's edict which banned them for two years (probably in order to break the bond between the Emperor and religious circles). The shogunate intervened making the bestowing of the garments invalid.
- December 22, 1629 ( Kan'ei 6, 8th day of the 11th month): The emperor renounced the throne in favor of his daughter, Kyōshi
- March 14, 1632 (Kan'ei 9, 24th day of the 1st month): Former Shōgun Hidetada died.
- February 28, 1633 (Kan'ei 10, 20th day of the 1st month): There was an earthquake in Odawara in the Sagami.
- 1634 (Kan'ei 11, 7th month): Shōgun Tokugawa Iemitsu appeared at Court in Miyako; and he visited ex-emperor Go-Mizunoo. Later, on the 22nd day of the 9th month was held at Fukiage Palace the famous martial arts tournament of 12 bout, organized by Shōgun Tokugawa Iemitsu, and held in the presence of the visiting Emperor. It entered in History under the name of Kan'ei Jōran Jiai and was judged by the two Kenjutsu instructor of the Shōgun.
- 1635 (Kan'ei 12): An ambassador from the King of Korea was received in Heian-kyō.
- 1636 (Kan'ei 13): The Kan'ei Tsūhō became the new standard copper cash coin of Japan.
- 1637 (Kan'ei 14): There was a major Christian rebellion in Arima and Shimabara; shogunal forces are sent to quell the disturbance.
- 1638 (Kan'ei 15): The Christian revolt was crushed; and 37,000 of the rebels are killed. The Christian religion is extirpated in Japan.
- 1640 (Kan'ei 17): A Spanish ship from Macao brought a delegation of 61 people to Nagasaki. They arrived on July 6, 1640; and on August 9, all of them were decapitated and their heads were stuck on poles.
- 1640-1643 (Kan'ei 17-20): Kan'ei Great Famine forces an agricultural reform giving a greater independence to the farmers and the reduction of military spendings.
- 1643 (Kan'ei 20): An ambassador from the King of Korea arrived in Heian-kyō.
- November 10, 1643 (Kan'ei 20, 29th day of the 9th month): In the 15th year of Empress Meishō's reign (明正天皇15年), the empress abdicated; and the succession (senso) was received by her brother.
- December 15, 1643 (Kan'ei 20, 5th day of the 11th month): Emperor Go-Kōmyō acceded to the throne (sokui).

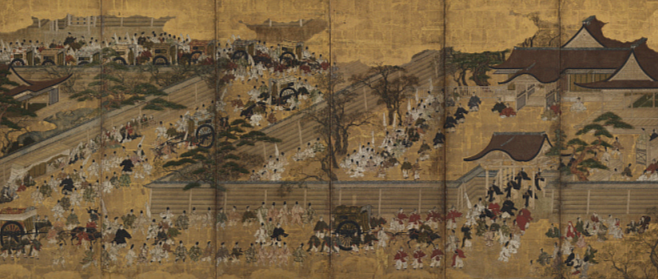
The Enthronement of Empress Meishō.

== Notes ==
Preceded by Genna (元和)	Era or nengō Kan'ei (寛永); 1624–1644	Succeeded by Shōhō (正保)
