= Princess Yoshiko (daughter of Go-Mizunoo) =

Japanese princess

Princess Yoshiko 賀子内親王
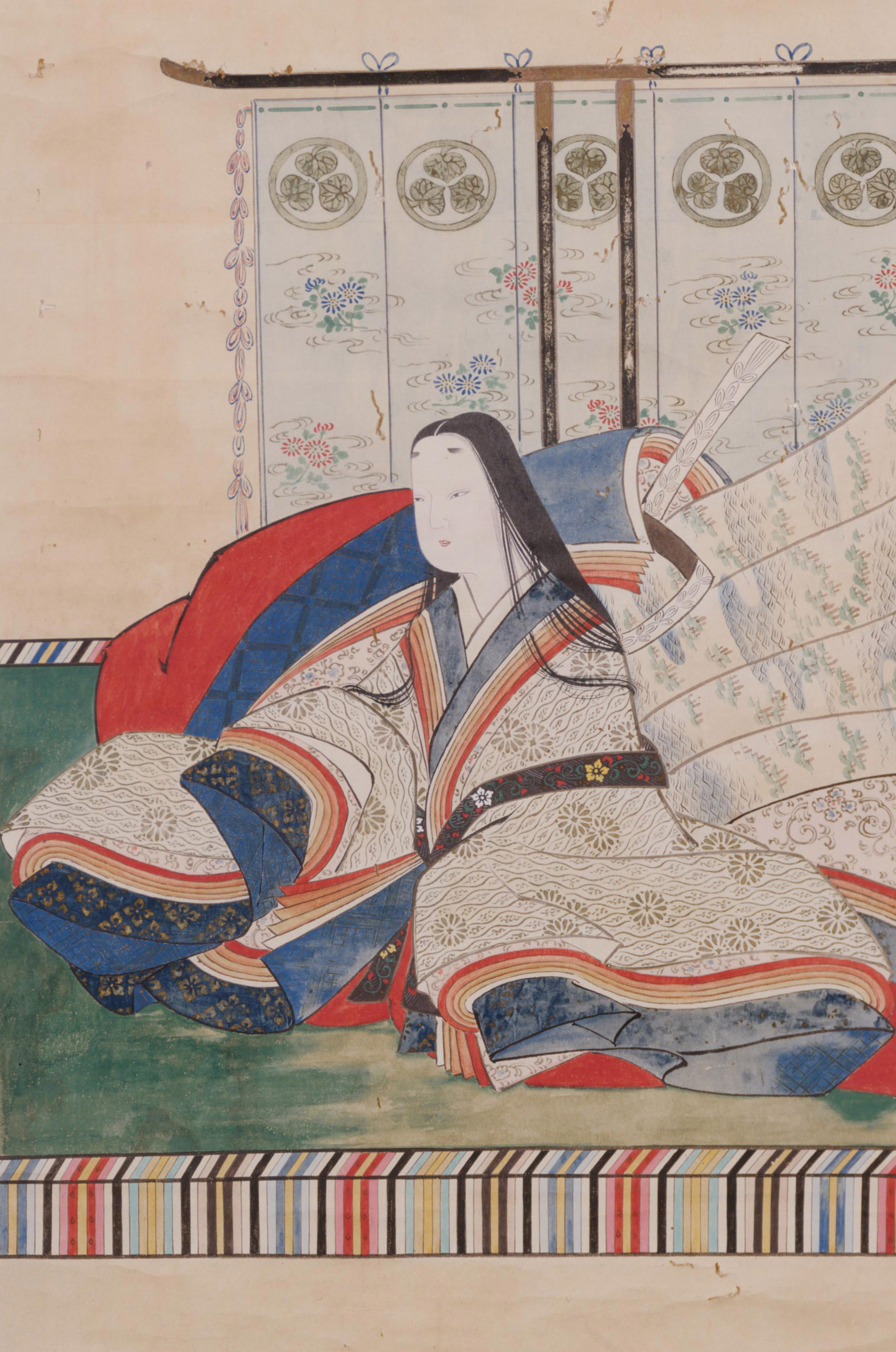
- Born: 21 July 1632
- Died: 29 August 1696 (aged 64)
- Burial: Nison-in
- Spouse: Nijō Mitsuhira
- Issue: Ryūsōin
- House: Imperial House of Japan
- Father: Emperor Go-Mizunoo
- Mother: Tokugawa Masako

Princess Yoshiko (賀子内親王; Yoshiko Naishinnō) was a Japanese princess born in 1632 to Emperor Go-Mizunoo and Tokugawa Masako.

== Life ==
Princess Yoshiko was born in 1632 to Emperor Go-Mizunoo and his wife, Tokugawa Masako. Yoshiko was Masako's last surviving child, and so following her birth Masako adopted Prince Tsuguhito (later Emperor Go-Kōmyō) who became the heir of their sister, Empress Meishō.

In 1644 she was promoted to the rank of Imperial Princess, and the following year wed Nijō Mitsuhira.

Mitsuhira was himself related to Yoshiko through his mother, Princess Sadako, daughter of Emperor Go-Yōzei.

From this marriage came a daughter, Ryūsōin, who married Tokugawa Tsunashige. However in 1669 Ryūsōin died only aged 22.

Following the death of her husband in 1682, Yoshiko became a nun and died in 1696.
