= Teruko, Princess Ake =

Japanese princess

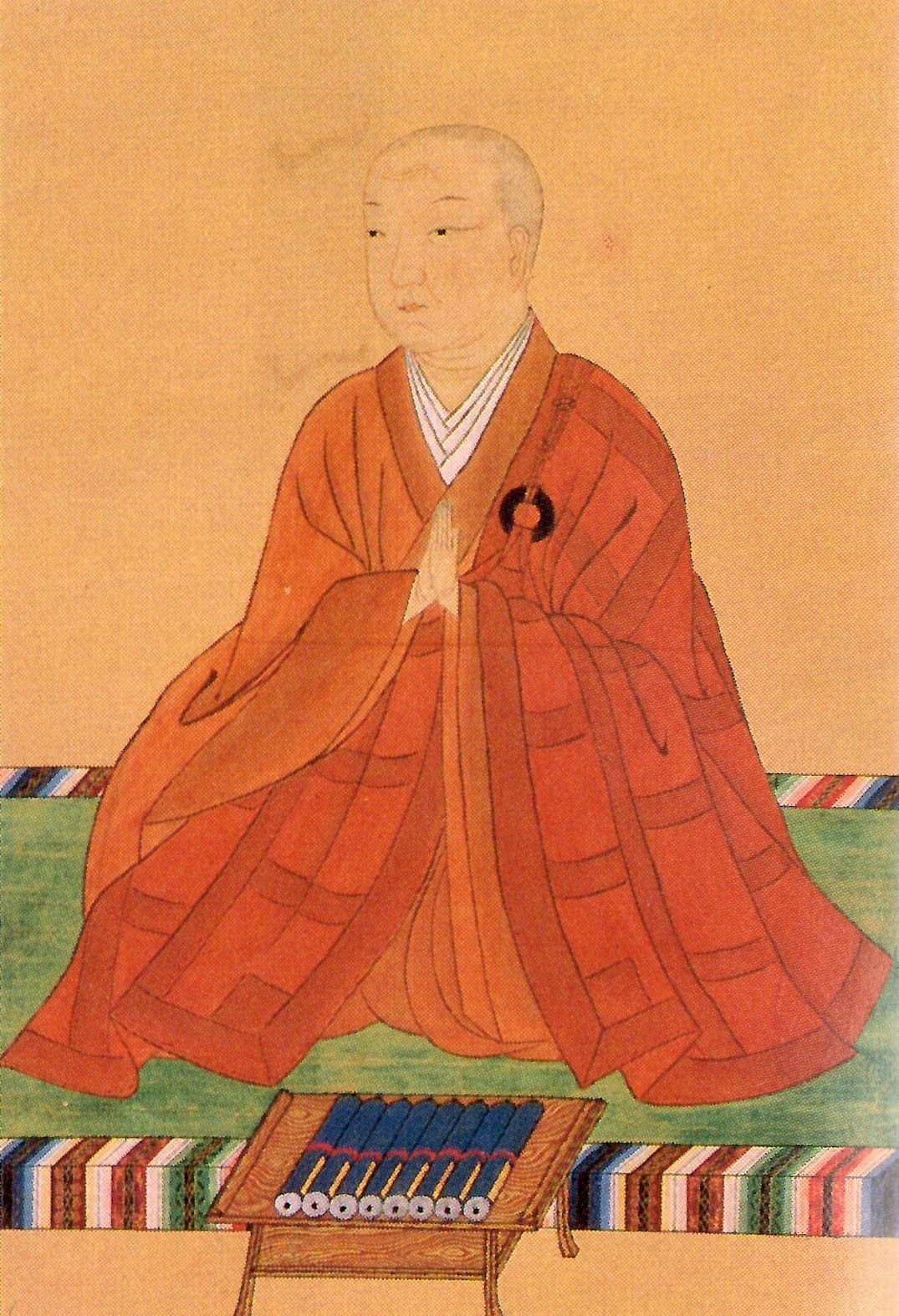
Self-portrait

Teruko, Princess Ake (光子内親王, Ake-no-miya Teruko Naishinnō, 25 July 1634 – 18 November 1727) was a Japanese imperial princess and artist. She was the eighth daughter of Emperor Go-Mizunoo.

After her father's death in 1680, she shaved her head and took the name Genyo, then entered . She founded Linkyuji Temple.

The Kosetsu Memorial Museum held a special exhibition on Japanese female artists, in which her work was also exhibited.

== See also ==
- Kiyohara Yukinobu (1643–82)
- Tokuyama Gyokuran (1727/8–84)
- Ema Saikō (1787–1861)
