= Genna =

Period of Japanese history (1615–1624)

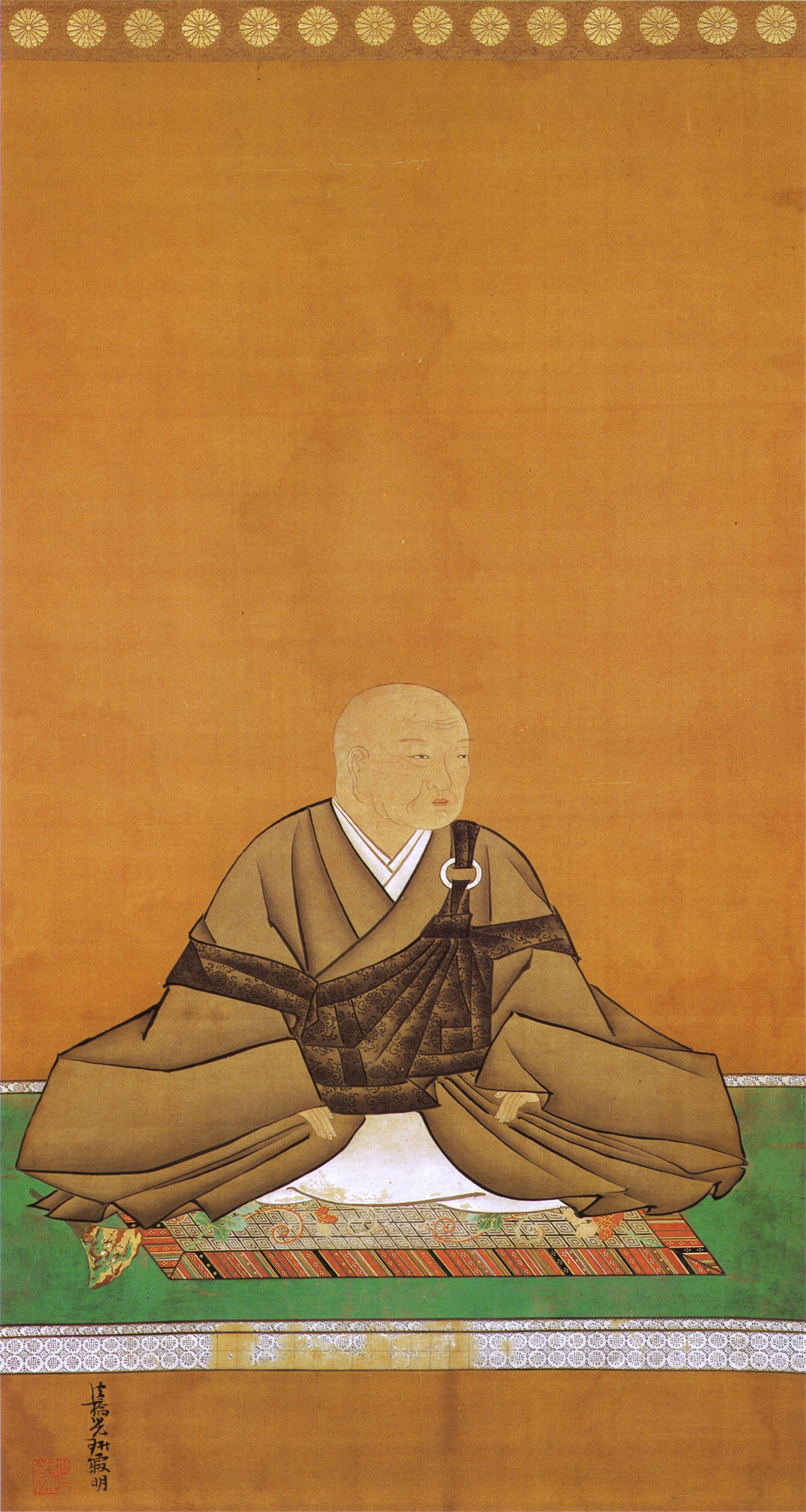
Portrait of Emperor Go Mizunoo, 18th Century

Genna (元和) was a Japanese era name (年号, nengō; "year name") coming after Keichō and before Kan'ei. This period spanned the time from September 5, 1615 to April 17, 1624 in the Gregorian calendar. The reigning emperor was Go-Mizunoo-tennō (後水尾天皇). It is also known as Genwa.

== Change of era ==
- 1615 Genna gannen (元和元年): The era name was changed to mark the enthronement of Go-Mizunuoo and because of disasters such as the siege of Osaka (大坂の役,, Ōsaka-no-eki), or more commonly, siege of Osaka (大坂の陣,, Ōsaka-no-jin). The old era ended and a new one commenced in Keichō 20.

The siege of Osaka was a series of battles undertaken by the Tokugawa shogunate against the Toyotomi clan, ending in that clan's destruction. Divided into two stages (the "Winter Campaign" and the "Summer Campaign"), and lasting from 1614 through 1615, the siege put an end to the last major armed opposition to the establishment of an enduring Tokugawa shogunate. The end of this period of fighting is also sometimes called the Genna armistice (元和偃武,, Genna-enbu) because the era name was changed from Keichō to Genna immediately following its ultimate resolution.

By order of Tokugawa Ieyasu, the era name of Emperor Xianzong of Tang China was adopted.

== Events of the Genna era ==
- 1615 (Genna 1): Tokugawa Ieyasu and his son, Shōgun Hidetada, marched again to Osaka Castle, which was captured and burned.
- September 1, 1615 (Genna 1, 9th day of the 7th month): Ieyasu pulled down Hōkoku-jinja.
- September 20, 1615 (Genna 1, 28th day of the 7th month): Ieyasu promulgated the Genna-rei in 17 clauses.
- June 1, 1616 (Genna 2, 17th day of the 4th month): Ieyasu died at Suruga.
- September 25, 1617 (Genna 3, 26th day of the 8th month): Former-Emperor Go-Yōzei died. He is buried at Nikkō.
- 1618 (Genna 4, 8th month): A comet appeared in the sky.
- July 5, 1620 (Genna 6, 6th day of the 6th month): The emperor was married to Tokugawa Kazuko, the daughter of Shōgun Hidetada; and also in that year.
- 1620 (Genna 6): There were severe fires in Mikayo on the 30th day of the 2nd month and on the 4th day of the 3rd month.
- September 10, 1622 (Genna 8, 5th day of the 8th month): the Great Genna Martyrdom — 55 foreign and Japanese Catholics are executed in Nagasaki, part of the persecution of Christians in Japan by Tokugawa Hidetada.
- September 6, 1623 (Genna 9, 12th day of the 8th month): the bakufu raised the Imperial maintenance allowance by 10,000 koku.
- 1623 (Genna 9): Tokugawa Iemitsu, son of Hidetada, came to the court of the emperor where he was made Shōgun.

== Notes ==
Preceded by Keichō (慶長)	Era or nengō Genna (元和); 1615–1624	Succeeded by Kan'ei (寛永)
