= Empress Meishō =

Emperor of Japan from 1629 to 1643

Empress Meishō 明正天皇
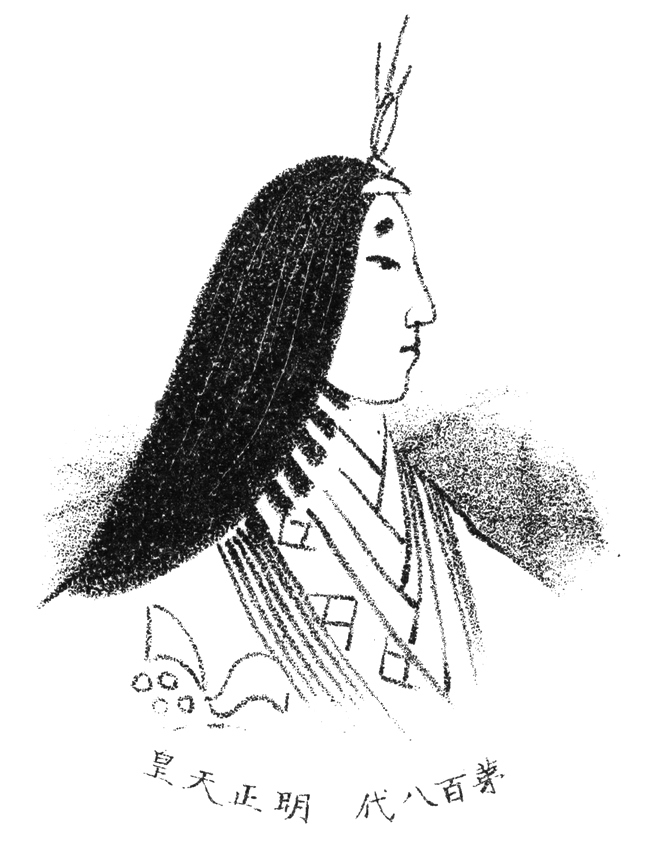

Empress of Japan
- Reign: December 22, 1629 – November 14, 1643
- Enthronement: October 17, 1630
- Predecessor: Go-Mizunoo
- Successor: Go-Kōmyō
- Shōguns: Tokugawa Iemitsu
- Born: Okiko (興子); January 9, 1624; Kyoto, Kyoto Prefecture, Tokugawa shogunate
- Died: December 4, 1696 (aged 72); Kyoto, Kyoto Prefecture, Tokugawa shogunate
- Burial: Tsuki no wa no misasagi, Kyoto
Posthumous name
- Tsuigō: Empress Meishō (明正院 or 明正天皇)
- House: Imperial House of Japan
- Father: Emperor Go-Mizunoo
- Mother: Tokugawa Masako
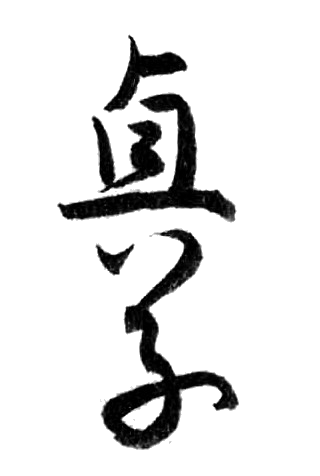
- Signature

Empress Meishō (明正天皇, Meishō-tennō; January 9, 1624 – December 4, 1696), personal name Okiko (Japanese: 興子), was the 109th monarch of Japan, according to the traditional order of succession. Her reign lasted from 1629 to 1643. Her reign officially began when she was five years old and continued for fifteen years. It is believed that Meishō's father actually ruled in her name until she abdicated in favor of her younger half-brother.

Following her ascension to the throne, Empress Meishō became Japan's first female emperor in over 900 years, since Empress Shōtoku.

== Pre-birth and context ==
Empress Meishō's father was Emperor Go-Mizunoo. The emperor's consort and lady-in-waiting before the empress's birth was Yotsutsuji Yotsuko.

The Shōgun, Tokugawa Hidetada was eager for his daughter, Tokugawa Masako to join the imperial court. This was something that retired-shōgun Tokugawa Ieyasu, her grandfather, also tried push for under the reign of Go-Mizunoo's father, Emperor Go-Yōzei. However, Yotsuko was pregnant and thus it would be taboo to accept a new consort. Yotsuko gave birth to a boy, Prince Kamo, however soon after Yotsuko fell pregnant again, this time giving birth to a girl, Princess Bunchi.

Hidetada ordered the expulsion of Yotsuko from court and in 1620 Masako joined the court. The Emperor, however, was dissatisfied with the Shōgun's involvement in imperial affairs. Masako's placement in court furthermore was another way for the Shōgun to control the Emperor.

== Pre-ascension ==
Empress Meishō was born in 1624 as Princess Okiko to Emperor Go-Mizunoo and his wife Tokugawa Masako.

Following her birth Masako was promoted to the rank of empress consort.

In 1626 a son, Prince Sukehito, was born. Sukehito was quickly made crown prince but died in 1628.

The Emperor was sick of the Shōgun undermining his authority, such as in the Purple Robe Incident in which the Emperor bestowed ranks and titles to 10 Buddhist monks, only for the Shōgun to strip them.

Tokugawa Masako would have one more son, however, in order to prevent the Emperor from having any male heirs and thus abdicating, the Shōgun ditched his desire of a Tokugawa emperor and forced Masako to give up her child to Prince Hachijō Toshihito. The boy would die soon after, and Toshihito himself would die soon after in 1629. Thus, the Emperor sought to abdicate in secret, and with no male heirs, did so in 1629 resorting to abdicating in favour of his daughter.

== Reign ==
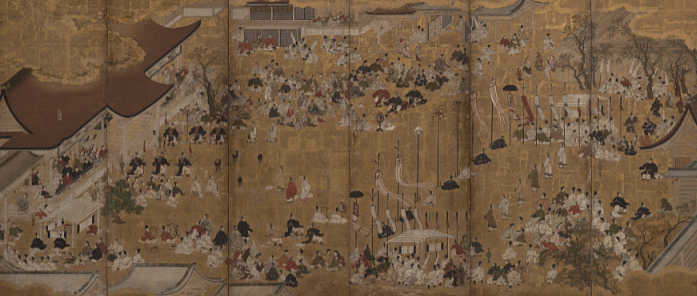
Depiction of Empress Meishō's enthronement.

Empress Meishō came to the throne in 1629 following the abdication of her father. The Shōgun was not notified.

Ten leading court nobles were notified, and it was agreed that a female emperor would be acceptable, with it declared:

The rites for a female emperor should not be a cause for difficulty; if it is to be so, the throne should be entrusted to the First Princess, and upon the birth of a prince, the throne should be abdicated.

(Note: 女帝の儀は苦しかるまじき、左様にも候わば、女一宮に御位預けられ、若宮御誕生の上、御譲位あるべき事)

The Empress's reign was uneventful, with her father handling matters of state. The former emperor continued having children in his retirement, with Lady Sono Mitsuko giving him a son, Prince Tsuguhito (later Emperor Go-Kōmyō).

Tokugawa Masako, who had given birth to her last surviving child, Princess Yoshiko, in 1632, adopted Prince Tsuguhito and he was declared Crown Prince. The following year in 1643, Empress Meishō abdicated.

Before her abdication, the Shōgun issued 4 articles of directives for the Empress, which included: The Empress was to be barred from all matters of court, such as the bestowing of titles (Article 1), that members of her family could visit her only during new years, and that other people were barred from visiting her (Article 2), if any court nobles needed to visit her, they had to speak to a messenger (Article 3), and finally that the she was permitted to visit her sister, Princess Ninomiya (Note: Ninomiya, or 女二宮 (Onna Ninomiya, Second Princess) is a title. Her personal name is unknown.), and half-brother Emperor Go-Kōmyō, with either one of her parents in attendance, but she was barred from visiting the new emperor alone, needing two servants with her at all time (Article 4).

== Post-reign and death ==
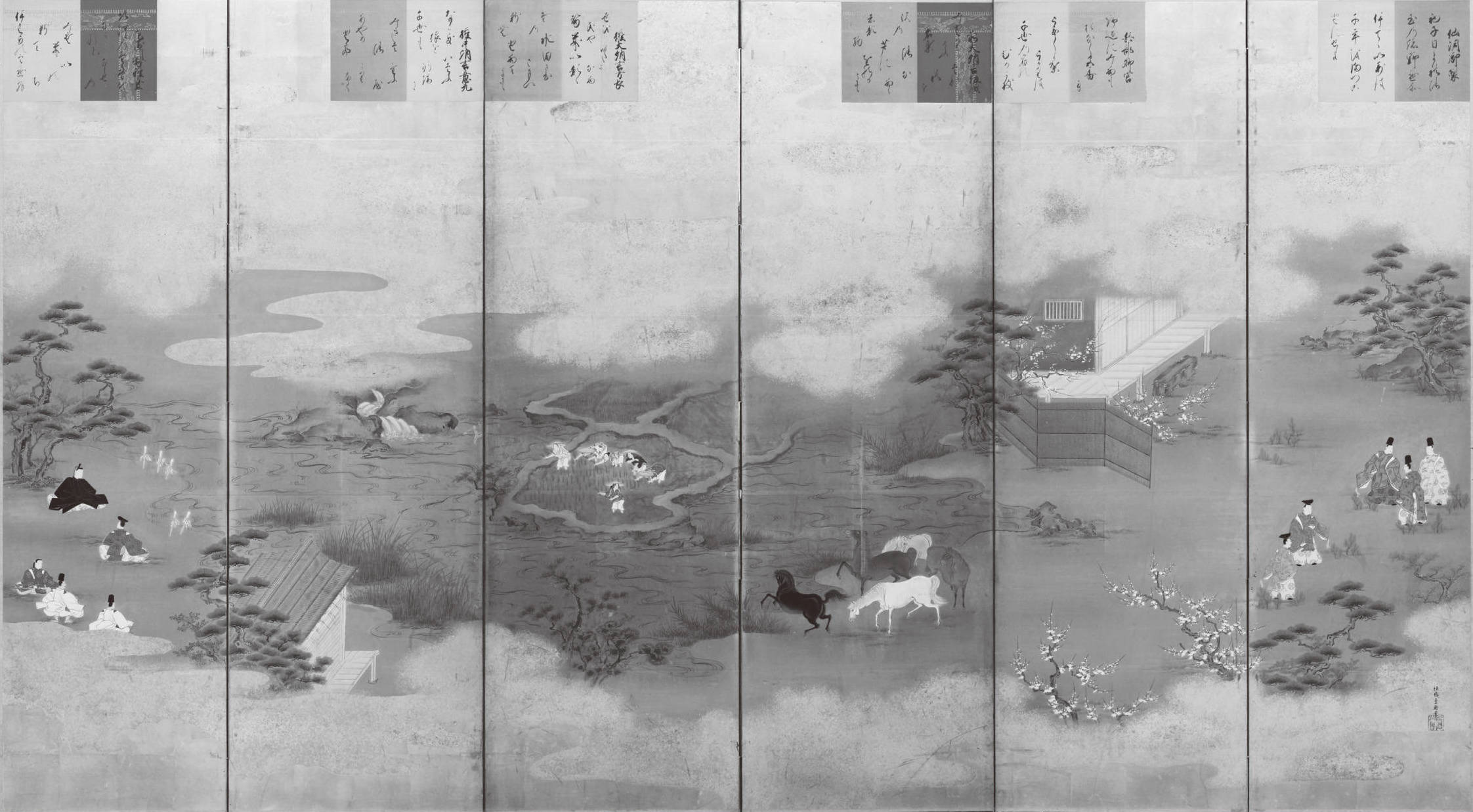
Congratulating Empress Meishō on her 70th Birthday, Enshōji, Nara, Nara, Japan

Upon her abdication she received the title Daijō Tennō. In 1692 her 70th birthday saw many celebrations with two paintings made, now considered important cultural properties.

Empress Meishō died aged 72 in 1694.

== Kugyō ==
Kugyō (公卿) is a collective term for the very few most powerful men attached to the court of the Emperor of Japan in pre-Meiji eras. Even during those years in which the court's actual influence outside the palace walls was minimal, the hierarchic organization persisted.

In general, this elite group included only three to four men at a time. These were hereditary courtiers whose experience and background would have brought them to the pinnacle of a life's career. During Meishō's reign, this apex of the Daijō-kan included:

- Sesshō, Ichijō Akiyoshi, 1629–1635
- Sesshō, Nijō Yasumichi, 1635–1647
- Sadaijin
- Udaijin
- Naidaijin
- Dainagon

== Era of Meishō's reign ==
The years of Meishō's reign are encompassed within one era name or nengō.

- Kan'ei (1624–1644)

== Ancestry ==
Ancestors of Empress Meishō

8. Prince Masahito (1552–1586)
4. Emperor Go-Yōzei (1571–1617)
9. Kanshūji Haruko (1553–1620)
2. Emperor Go-Mizunoo (1596–1680)
10.Konoe Sakihisa (1536–1612)
5.Konoe Sakiko (1575–1630)
11. Takeda
1. Empress Meishō
12. Tokugawa Ieyasu, 1st Tokugawa shōgun (1543–1616)
6. Tokugawa Hidetada, 2nd Tokugawa shōgun (1579–1632)
13. Lady Saigō (1552–1589)
3. Tokugawa Masako (1607–1678)
14. Azai Nagamasa (1545–1573)
7. Oeyo (1573–1626)
15. Oichi (1547–1583)

== Sources ==
- Kobayashi, Sadayoshi; Makino, Noboru (1994). 西郷氏興亡全史 [Complete History of the Rise and Fall of the Saigo Clan] (in Japanese). Tokyo, Japan: Rekishi Chosakenkyu-jo.
- Meyer, Eva-Maria (1999). Japans Kaiserhof in der Edo-Zeit: unter besonderer Berücksichtigung der Jahre 1846 bis 1867, Münster: LIT Verlag; ISBN 3-8258-3939-7/ISBN 978-3-8258-3939-0
  Japans Kaiserhof in der Edo-Zeit: unter besonderer Berücksichtigung der Jahre 1846 bis 1867; OCLC 42041594
- Ponsonby-Fane, Richard (1959). The Imperial House of Japan, Kyoto: Ponsonby Memorial Society; OCLC 194887
  The Imperial House of Japan; OCLC 194887
- Titsingh, Isaac (1834). Nihon Ōdai Ichiran Annales des empereurs du Japon pp. 411–412, Paris: Royal Asiatic Society, Oriental Translation Fund of Great Britain and Ireland.
- Varley, H. Paul (1980). Jinnō Shōtōki: A Chronicle of Gods and Sovereigns, New York: Columbia University Press. ISBN 0-231-04940-4/ISBN 978-0-231-04940-5

Regnal titles
Preceded by Emperor Go-Mizunoo	Empress of Japan: Meishō; 1629–1643	Succeeded by Emperor Go-Kōmyō
