= Sakoku Edict of 1635 =

Japanese law against foreign influence

The Sakoku Edict (Sakoku-rei, 鎖国令) of 1635 was a Japanese decree intended to eliminate foreign influence, enforced by strict government rules and regulations to impose these ideas. It was the third of a series issued by Tokugawa Iemitsu, shōgun of Japan from 1623 to 1651. The Edict of 1635 is considered a prime example of the Japanese desire for seclusion. The Edict of 1635 was written to the two commissioners of Nagasaki, a port city located in southwestern Japan.

== Japan before seclusion ==
Before the issuing of the exclusion edicts in 1633, Japanese fascination with European culture brought trade of various goods and commercial success to the country. Items such as eyeglasses, clocks, firearms, and artillery were in high demand in Japan, and trade began to flourish between the Japanese and Europe.

With the exchange of goods came the exchange of ideas as well. Christian missionaries, such as Francis Xavier, were among the first to travel to Japan to teach Catholicism. For a time, they were encouraged to enlighten the Japanese people, and Oda Nobunaga, during his reign as military leader of Japan in the 1570s and 1580s, encouraged the conversion of the Japanese to Catholicism. His hopes of competing with his Buddhist rivals led him to allow Catholic missionary activity in Japan. In Kyoto, Japan's capital city, a large portion of the population had already been converted to Christianity by the seventeenth century.

Following Nobunaga was Toyotomi Hideyoshi, who ruled over Japan from 1582 to 1598. Anti-European attitudes began under Hideyoshi, whose suspicion of the Europeans first began with their intimidating appearance; their armed ships and sophisticated military power produced doubt and distrust, and following the conquest of the Philippines by the Spanish, Hideyoshi was convinced they were not to be trusted. The true motives of the Europeans came quickly into question.

Those who converted to Catholicism were questioned about their loyalty to Japan, and in 1597, Hideyoshi ordered the crucifixion of nine Catholic missionaries and seventeen Japanese converts. This was only the start of the hostility towards European influence and interaction; persecutions, decapitations, and forced conversions would all but eliminate the Christian community over the next few decades.

Tokugawa Ieyasu, who conquered Japan in 1600, was skeptical of the Spanish and Portuguese, due in part to the influence of his English advisor William Adams. After the establishment of the Tokugawa shogunate in 1603, Japan began trading with the Dutch East India Company and English East India Company through factories at Hirado in present-day Nagasaki Prefecture. Ieyasu's successor Hidetada significantly curtailed Catholic activity in Japan and banned foreign trading in Osaka and Kyoto.

== Decrees of the Edict ==
The key points of the Edict of 1635 included:

- The Japanese were to be kept within Japan's own boundaries. Strict rules were set to prevent them from leaving the country. Anyone caught trying to leave the country, or anyone who managed to leave and then returned from abroad, was to be executed. Europeans who entered Japan illegally would face the death penalty too.
- Catholicism was strictly forbidden. Those found practicing the Christian faith were subject to investigation, and anyone associated with Catholicism would be punished. To encourage the search for those who still followed Christianity, rewards were given to those who were willing to turn them in. Prevention of missionary activity was also stressed by the edict; no missionary was allowed to enter, and if apprehended by the government, he would face imprisonment.
- Trade restrictions and strict limitations on goods were set to limit the ports open to trade, and the merchants who would be allowed to engage in trade. Relations with the Portuguese were cut off entirely; Chinese merchants and those of the Dutch East India Company were restricted to enclaves in Nagasaki. Trade was also conducted with China through the semi-independent vassal kingdom of the Ryukyus, with Korea via the Tsushima Domain, and also with the Ainu people through the Matsumae Domain.

== Enforcement ==
As a way of enforcing the edict, investigation methods such as the anti-Christian inquisition were established to expose those still practicing Catholicism. The fumi-e ceremony was considered yet another way of detecting a Christian; to reveal any individual that was still loyal to the Christian faith, a picture resembling that of Jesus or Mary was placed on the floor of a pagoda, and everyone within the building was required to step on it. If any hesitation was visible, or any reluctance was detected, that individual was automatically suspect and subject to investigation.

Monetary rewards were also offered to anyone who had information regarding the violation of the edict. Anyone suspected of disregarding the decree would undergo a thorough investigation, and punishment usually followed. The allowance of ships was strictly regulated; only specific vessels were permitted to enter Japan, and merchants had to obtain special licenses to trade. Although trade was not cut off completely, it was very rare. To discourage those from embracing anything even remotely related to Europe, the Tokugawa punished any offenders that happened to surface. Many were publicly tortured, and often faced the death penalty as a result of their practices.

== After the Edict ==
Following the precedence of this seclusion edict, others followed in its footsteps. One example is the edict detailing the Exclusion of the Portuguese in 1639. This isolationist policy would continue to thrive until 1854, over two hundred years later, when Commodore Matthew Perry from the Americas compelled Japan at the Convention of Kanagawa (Nichibei Washin Jōyaku, 日米和親条約). Although the isolationist policy was not willingly given up, on July 29, 1858, Japan and the United States signed the Treaty of Amity and Commerce (Nichibei Shūkō Tsūshō Jōyaku, 日米修好通商条約), also known as the Harris Treaty. The signing of this document opened numerous trade ports in areas such as Edo, Kobe, Nagasaki, Niigata and Yokohama along Japan's coast.

== See also ==
- Sakoku
