= Purple Robe Incident =

1627 Japanese political incident

The Purple Robe Incident (紫衣事件, shie jiken) was a political conflict that took place in 1627, Japan. A confrontation between the Tokugawa shogunate and the Imperial Court began when the Emperor granted permission for monks from two temples to wear purple robes. Purple robes were traditionally reserved for only the most virtuous priests, and the Shogunate declared the Emperor's decree invalid, as he had not consulted with them beforehand. The confrontation is believed to have contributed to Emperor Go-Mizunoo's abdication in 1629, and is a noted example of the control of the Shogunate over the Imperial Court in the early Edo period.

== Background ==
The incident took place in the early Edo period (1603–1868) and pitted the Tokugawa shogunate and the Imperial Court against each other. At the time, the Shogunate had enacted laws in an attempt to assert its control over the imperial court and temples, including the "Imperial Purple Robe Laws for Admission to Daitokuji Temple, Myoshinji Temple, and other temples in Yamashiro" in 1613 and the "Laws of the Forbidden and the Lord's Families" in 1615. The incident was instigated by the shogunate, which had established the Kin-chō-nampō regulations in order to control the imperial court. These regulations included provisions regarding the permission required for Buddhist priests to wear the purple robe, which was a symbol of high virtue and required the emperor's approval. However, the shogunate interfered strictly with these regulations, leading to dissatisfaction among the emperor and the nobility.

In 1626, Emperor Gomizunoo allowed monks from Daitokuji and Myoshinji temples to wear purple robes, which were traditionally reserved for highly virtuous priests. However, the Shogunate declared these licenses invalid, claiming that the emperor had not consulted with them beforehand. This led to a protest from the monks at Daitokuji, and the incident became known as the Purple Robe Incident or the Shie incident.

== The Incident ==
The Purple Robe Incident occurred in 1627 (Kan'ei 4) when the Emperor was accused of having bestowed honorific purple garments to more than ten priests despite the shōgun's edict which banned them for two years, a practice probably set in place to break the bond between the Emperor and religious circles. The shogunate promptly declared the bestowing of the garments invalid and ordered the Kyoto Shoshidai to confiscate the robes. The priests which had been honored by the emperor were sent into exile by the bakufu.

The confrontation between the imperial court and the Shogunate was so severe that it is believed to have contributed to Emperor Go-Mizunoo's decision to abdicate the throne. The incident is seen as an example of the oppressive control exercised by the Shogunate over the imperial court during this period. Takuan Sōhō, a former head abbot of Daitoku-ji, together with the senior priesthood of Daitoku-ji and Myōshin-ji protested this action, and were arrested. They were tried for sedition at Edo Castle in front of Shogun Tokugawa Hidetada and Takuan was banished to Kaminoyama in Dewa Province. In 1632, after the death of Hidetada, a general amnesty was proclaimed. The incident is considered one of the most significant examples of discord between the two sides in the early Edo period.

Go-Mizunoo abdicated on 22 December 1629 (Kan'ei 6, 8th day of the 11th month), renouncing the throne to his daughter, Okiko, on the same day that the priests of the Purple Robe Incident went into exile. Okiko became the Empress Meishō. For the rest of his long life, Go-Mizuno-in concentrated on various aesthetic projects and interests, of which perhaps the best-known are the magnificent Japanese gardens of the Shugakuin Imperial Villa.

== Aftermath ==
A few years after the Purple Robe Incident, in 1634, Iemitsu entered Kyoto in a grand manner, displaying the Shogunate's overwhelming power, and had an audience with Empress Meishō at the Imperial Court. He presented the empress with 7,000 koku of the imperial fiefdom and made peace with the emperor. Iemitsu also donated a large sum of money to Daitokuji Temple to build a Buddhist temple, and opened Rinshoin Temple in Myoshinji Temple for Kasuga Bureki.

During his visit to Kyoto, Iemitsu also met Takuan, the mastermind behind the Purple Robe Incident. In 1632, Tokugawa Hidetada, the second shogun of the Tokugawa Shogunate, had died, and those involved in the Shigoromo Incident were forgiven. After this meeting, Iemitsu became deeply devoted to Takuan and called him to Edo. Takuan strongly desired to return to his hometown, but in 1639, Iemitsu had Mansho-san Tokai-ji Temple built in Shinagawa with Takuan as its founder, and allowed Takuan to stay in Edo.

At the time, since the fall of the Ritsuryōsei, eaten up by the many Shōen (untaxed fiefdoms) created for tax evasion, the Emperors and Imperial Court had practically no revenues left, and the Tokugawa Bakufu had alloted ten thousand Kokudaka for the Imperial Court, so that the Emperor be at least at Daimyō level. However, in truth, most of the Kokudaka was being stolen by samurai clans such as Yodo-han, Kōriyama-han, Inaba-han, and probably the Yagyū clan as well, and these tax thefts included the Kyōto Shoshidai ; the remainder was some of the poorest, least fertile places in the otherwise very fertile Kansai basin. Out of 10000 koku the Imperial Court collected less than 3000 koku. Hence, Iemitsu "reconciled" by "gifting" the missing money of a year's harvests, which was nothing compared to the millions of Kokudaka of the Tokugawa Bakufu ; it was an insult.

As for Takuan Sōhō, he returned to Daitoku-ji and was received in an audience arranged by Yagyū Munenori and Tenkai in Kyōto by Hidetada's successor, Tokugawa Iemitsu, who was very much impressed by Takuan's intelligence and insights. At Iemitsu's invitation, he returned to Edo, where he gave many lectures to Iemitsu, who eventually rescinded the "Purple Robes decree" in 1641, restoring Daitoku-ji to its original honors. In the meantime, Iemitsu had the temple of Tōkai-ji constructed in Shinagawa at the outskirts of Edo in 1639 especially for Takuan, so that he could draw on Takuan's counsel at any time.

It is said that it was Yagyu Munenori who arranged the meeting between Iemitsu and Takuan, but it is also said that it was actually Soshin who arranged the meeting. It is said that Takuan and Soshin were acquaintances through their friendship with Ichichu (Soshin's uncle) of Myoshinji Zoka-in Temple. It is also said that Soshin was the one who recommended Iemitsu to invite Takuan to Edo (present-day Tokyo), and that Soshin was also responsible for the construction of Tokai-ji Temple and its invitation to Takuan to stay in Edo. Ostensibly, Iemitsu's stay in Edo was in response to his devotion to the shōgun, but from another perspective, it could be said that Takuan, who had rebelled against the shogunate, was separated from the forces of the imperial court and held hostage in Edo. Unable to fulfill his dream of returning home, Takuan died in Edo in 1645. It is a well-known anecdote that in his final days, he told his disciples that he did not want a grave or funeral service.

Takuan died in Edo in 1645. In the moments before his death, he wrote the kanji character 夢 ('dream'), and laid down his brush. He also left behind a will stating that a "tombstone must not be built" and that he should be buried without any ceremony in an unmarked grave. His disciples promptly erected gravestones at the temple of Tōkai-ji and also at the temple of Sōkyō-ji in Izushi. His grave at Tōkai-ji was proclaimed a National Historic Site in 1926.

The incident was considered a transitionary stage in how Sōtō Zen behaved in Japanese politics.

== Bibliography ==
- "Kronic: A Complete History of the Sengoku" edited by Hiroko Ikegami, Tetsuo Owada, Seiji Kobayashi, Kyou Ike and Naonori Kurokawa (Kodansha, 1995).

== Related topics ==
- Timeline of Japanese history
- Lady Kasuga
- Empress Meishō
