= Emperor Go-Mizunoo =

Emperor of Japan from 1611 to 1629

Emperor Go-Mizunoo 後水尾天皇
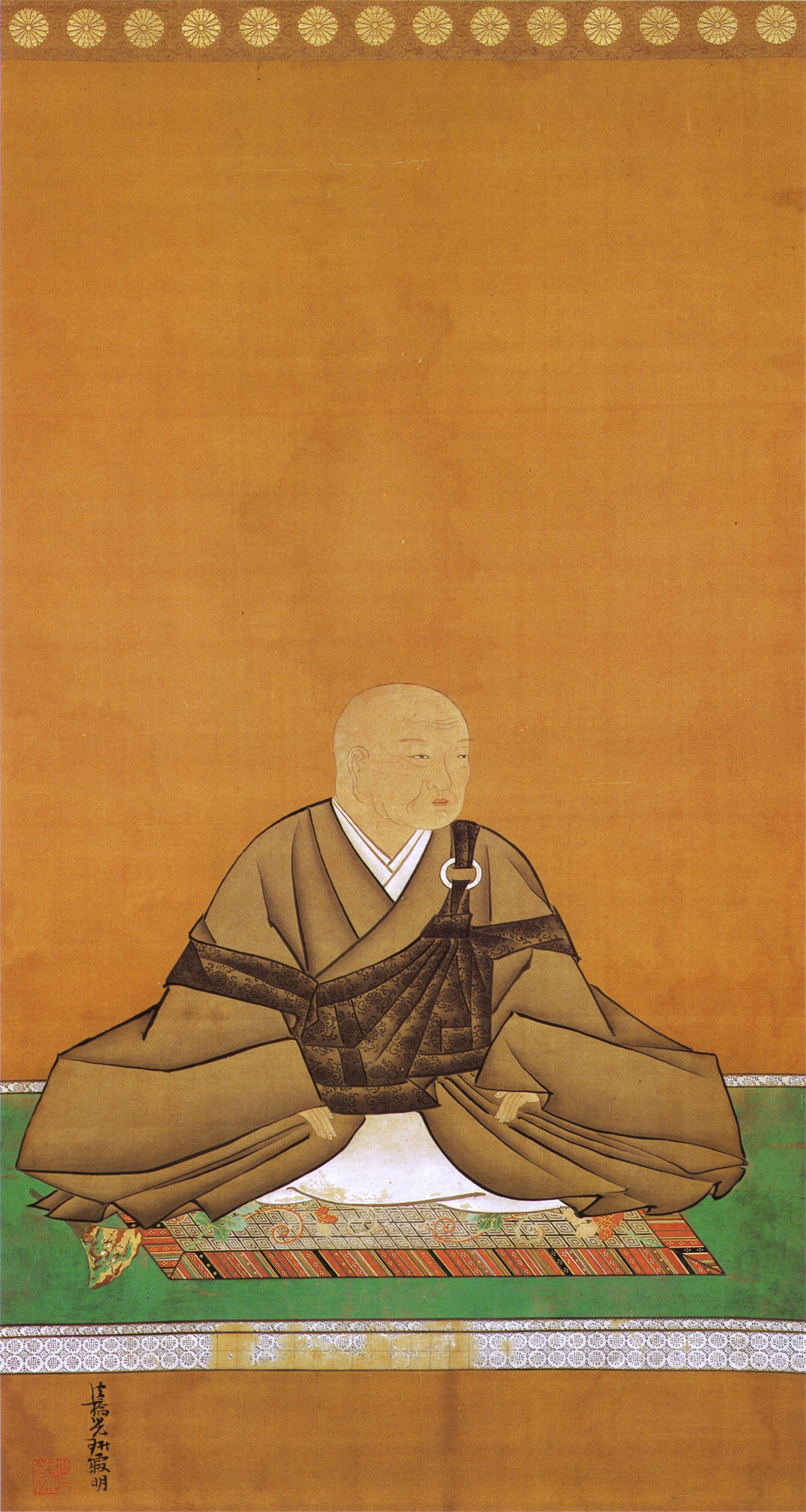
- Portrait by Ogata Kōrin, early 18th century

Emperor of Japan
- Reign: 9 May 1611 – 22 December 1629
- Enthronement: 23 May 1611
- Predecessor: Go-Yōzei
- Successor: Meishō
- Shōguns: See list: Tokugawa Hidetada; Tokugawa Iemitsu
- Born: Kotohito (政仁); 29 June 1596; Kyoto, Kyoto Prefecture, Azuchi–Momoyama period
- Died: 11 September 1680 (aged 84); Sentō Imperial Palace, Tokugawa shogunate (now Japan)
- Burial: Tsuki no wa no misasagi, Kyoto
- Spouse: Tokugawa Masako (m. 1620; died 1678)
- Issue more...: Empress Meishō; Emperor Go-Kōmyō; Teruko, Princess Ake; Emperor Go-Sai; Emperor Reigen
Era dates
- See list: Keichō(1596–1615) Genna (1615–1624) Kan'ei (1624–1644)
Posthumous name
- Tsuigō: Emperor Go-Mizunoo (後水尾院 or 後水尾天皇)
- House: Imperial House of Japan
- Father: Emperor Go-Yōzei
- Mother: Konoe Sakiko
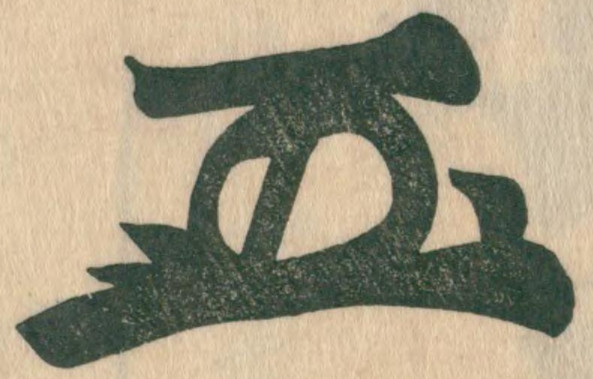
- Signature

Emperor Go-Mizunoo (後水尾天皇, Gomizunō Tennō; [ɡo̞mʲizɨno̞ː tẽ̞nːo̞ː]) (29 June 1596 - 11 September 1680), personal name Kotohito (Japanese: 政仁; IPA: [ko̞to̞çito̞], was the 108th Emperor of Japan, according to the traditional order of succession. Go-Mizunoo's reign spanned the years from 1611 through 1629, and he was the first emperor to reign entirely during the Edo period.

This 17th-century sovereign was named after the 9th-century Emperor Seiwa, sometimes posthumously referred to as Mizunoo (水尾) because this is the location of his tomb, while go translates as "later", and thus, he could be called the "Later Emperor Mizunoo". The Japanese word go has also been translated to mean the "second one", and in some older sources, this emperor may be identified as "Mizunoo, the second" or "Mizunoo II".

== Genealogy ==
Before Go-Mizunoo's accession to the Chrysanthemum Throne, his personal name (his imina) was Kotohito (政仁) or Masahito. He was the third son of Emperor Go-Yōzei and his consort, Konoe Sakiko. Prince Kotohito had 11 full siblings (7 sisters and 4 brothers).

He resided together with concubines in the Kyoto Imperial Palace. He had 33 children with his empress consort and 6 concubines.

Consort and issue(s):

- Empress (Chūgū): Tokugawa Masako (徳川和子, 23 November 1607 – 2 August 1678), later known as Tōfuku-mon'in (東福門院), daughter of Tokugawa Hidetata and Lady Oeyo
  - Second Daughter: Imperial Princess Okiko (興子内親王, 9 January 1624 – 4 December 1696), later Empress Meishō
  - Third Daughter: Princess Onna-ni (女二宮, 14 October 1625 – 2 July 1651), Legal Wife of Konoe Hisatsugu
  - Second Son: Prince Sukehito (高仁親王, 31 December 1626 – 11 July 1628)
  - Third Son: Prince Waka (若宮, b.1628)
  - Fourth Daughter: Imperial Princess Akiko (女三宮昭子内親王, 13 October 1629 — 18 June 1675)
  - Sixth Daughter: Imperial Princess Yoshiko (女五宮賀子内親王, 21 July 1632 – 2 August 1696) married Nijō Mitsuhira
  - Seventh Daughter: Princess Kiku (菊宮, 1633–1634)
- Lady-in-waiting (Naishi-no-Suke): Yotsutsuji Yotsuko (四辻与津子, d. 9 January 1639), later known as Meikyō'in (明鏡院), was the daughter of Yotsutsuji Kinto (四辻公遠)
  - First Son: Prince Kamo (賀茂宮, 21 November 1618 – 4 November 1622)
  - First Daughter: Princess Bunchi (文智女王, 30 July 1619 – 4 February 1697 ), Wife of Takatsukasa Norihira
- Lady-in-waiting (Naishi-no-Suke): Sono (Fujiwara) Mitsuko (園光子) 1602– 6 March 1656, later known as Mibu'in (壬生院), Sadaijin, was the daughter of Sono Mototada (園基任)
  - Fourth Son: Imperial Prince Tsuguhito (紹仁親王, 20 April 1633 – 30 October 1654), later Emperor Go-Kōmyō
  - Sixth Son: Imperial Prince Priest Syuchō (守澄法親王, 3 September 1634 – 12 June 1680), abbot of Kan'ei-ji in Ueno
  - Tenth Daughter: Princess Gensho (元昌女王, 1637–1662)
  - Eleventh Daughter: Princess Sōchō (宗澄女王, 12 March 1639 – 27 March 1678)
  - Thirteenth Daughter: Princess Katsura (桂宮, 1641–1644)
- Lady-in-waiting (Naishi-no-Suke): Kushige (Fujiwara) Takako (1604– 23 June 1685; 櫛笥隆子) later Hōshunmon-in (逢春門院), daughter of Kushige Takachika( 櫛笥隆致)
  - Fifth Daughter: Princess Risho (理昌女王, 1631–1656)
  - Fifth Son: Unnamed Prince (b.1633)
  - Eight Daughter: Imperial Princess Ake-no-miya Teruko (光子内親王, 25 July 1634 – 18 November 1727)
  - Eight Son: Imperial Prince Nagahito (秀宮良仁親王, 1 January 1638 – 22 March 1685), later Emperor Go-Sai
  - Ninth Son: Imperial Prince Priest Shosin (性真法親王; 1639 – 1696)
  - Twelfth Daughter: Princess Masa (摩佐; 1640–1641)
  - Fourteenth Daughter: Princess Richu (理忠女王; 1641 – 1689)
  - Eleventh Son: Imperial Prince Hachijō-no-miya Yasuhito (八条宮穏仁親王, 15 June 1643 – 9 November 1665)
  - Thirteenth Son: Imperial Prince Priest Dōkan (道寛法親王; 1647–1676)
- Lady-in-waiting (Naishi-no-Suke): Sono (Fujiwara) Kuniko (1624 – 3 August 1677; 園国子) later Shin-Kogimon-in (新広義門院), daughter of Sono Motonari (園基音)
  - Tenth Son: Prince Priest Gyojo (堯恕法親王; 29 November 1640 – 28 May 1695)
  - Fifteenth Daughter: Imperial Princess Tsuneko (常子内親王; 8 April 1642 – 17 September 1702)
  - Fourteenth Son: Imperial Prince Priest Shinmu (眞敬法親王; 1649–1706)
  - Sixteenth Son: Imperial Prince Priest Sonshoho (尊証法親王; 31 March 1651 – 1 December 1694)
  - Nineteenth Son: Imperial Prince Satohito (高貴宮識仁親王, 9 July 1654 – 24 September 1732), later Emperor Reigen
  - Seventeenth Daughter: Princess Eikyo (永享女王; 1657–1686).
- Lady-in-waiting (Naishi-no-Suke): Yotsutsuji Tsuguko (四辻継子; d.13 August 1657), daughter of Yotsutsuji Suetsugu (四辻季継)
  - Twelfth Son: Imperial Prince Priest Sonko (尊光法親王; 1645 – 1680)
  - Eighteenth Son: Imperial Prince Priest Seiin (盛胤法親王; 1651 – 1680)
  - Sixteenth Daughter: Princess Bunsatsu (文察女王; 1654 – 1683)
- Court Lady (Miyahito): Minase Ujiko (水無瀬氏子; 1607– 16 June 1672), daughter of Minase Ujinori (水無瀬氏成)
  - Ninth Daughter: Princess Shin (新宮; 1635–1637)
  - Seventh Son: Imperial Prince Priest Shojo (性承法親王; 1637 – 1678)

== Events ==
Prince Masahito became emperor following the abdication of his emperor-father. The succession (the senso) was considered to have been received by the new monarch; and shortly thereafter, Emperor Go-Mizunoo is said to have acceded (the sokui). A distinct act of senso is unrecognized prior to Emperor Tenji; and all sovereigns except Jitō, Yōzei, Go-Toba, and Fushimi have senso and sokui in the same year until the reign of Emperor Go-Murakami. The events during Go-Mizunoo's lifetime shed some light on his reign. The years correspond with a period in which Tokugawa Hidetada and Tokugawa Iemitsu were leaders at the pinnacle of the Tokugawa shogunate.

On 29 June 1596, Masahito, who would be known posthumously as Go-Mizunoo, was born. Toyotomi Hideyori came to Miyako to visit the former Shōgun Tokugawa Ieyasu on 20 May 1610 (Keichō 15, 27th day of the 3rd month); the same day, Go-Yōzei announced his intention to renounce the throne. Following the abdication during the 26th year of Go-Yōzei-tennō's reign (後陽成天皇二十六年) on 9 May 1611 (Keichō 16), 16-year-old Go-Mizunoo became Emperor. The Siege of Osaka, during which Shōgun Tokugawa Hidetada vanquished Toyotomi Hideyori and set fire to Osaka Castle, occurred in 1614 (Keichō 19). He returned to Edo for the winter.

A strong earthquake struck on 26 November 1614 (Keichō 19, 25th day of the 10th month). A great bell for Daibutsu Temple in Kyoto was cast, also in that year. The Osaka Summer Battle began in 1615 (Keichō 20). Tokugawa Ieyasu and his son, Shōgun Hidetada, marched again to Osaka Castle (Genna 1), which was captured and burned. Hideyori was thought to have died by suicide but his body was never found. It was rumored he had fled to Satsuma, where a refuge had been prepared for him in advance. Ieyasu died at Suruga the following year (Genna 2, 17th day of the 4th month) and Former-Emperor Go-Yōzei died in 1617 (Genna 3, 26th day of the 8th month). Go-Yōzei was buried at the North Fukakusa Burial Mound (深草北陵, Fukakusa no Kita no Misasagi). Tokugawa Masako, daughter of Shōgun Hidetada, entered the palace as a consort of the emperor and the two married (Genna 6). A number of severe fires broke out in Kyoto during April 1620 (Genna 6).

In 1623, the Emperor made Tokugawa Iemitsu, son of Hidetada, shōgun (Genna 9) and later visited Nijō Castle (Kan'ei 3, 6th day of the 9th month). The "Purple Robe Incident" (紫衣事件, shi-e jiken) occurred in 1627 (Kan'ei 6) when the Emperor was accused of having bestowed honorific purple garments to more than ten priests despite the shōgun's edict which banned them for two years, a practice probably set in place to break the bond between the Emperor and religious circles. The shogunate intervened and made the bestowing of the garments invalid. The priests who had been honored by the emperor were sent into exile by the bakufu. Go-Mizunoo abdicated on 22 December 1629 (Kan'ei 6, 8th day of the 11th month), renouncing the throne to his daughter, Okiko, on the same day that the priests of the "Purple Robe Incident" went into exile. Okiko became the Empress Meishō. For the rest of his long life, Go-Mizuno-in concentrated on various aesthetic projects and interests, of which perhaps the best-known are the magnificent Japanese gardens of the Shugakuin Imperial Villa.

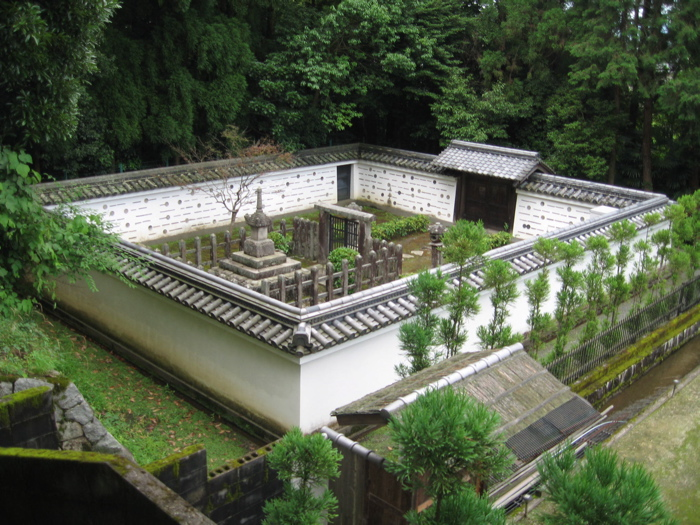
The mausoleum of Emperor Go-Mizunoo – Tsukinowa no misasagi – at Sennyū-ji in Higashiyama-ku, Kyoto.

Former Emperor Go-Mizunoo died on 11 September 1680 (Enpō 8, 19th day of the 8th month). Go-Mizunoo's memory is honored at Sennyū-ji in Higashiyama-ku, Kyoto where a designated Imperial mausoleum (misasagi) is located. It is named Tsuki no wa no misasagi. Also enshrined are this emperor's immediate Imperial successors – Meishō, Go-Kōmyō, Go-Sai, Reigen, Higashiyama, Nakamikado, Sakuramachi, Momozono, Go-Sakuramachi and Go-Momozono.

=== Kugyō ===
Kugyō (公卿) is a collective term for the very few most powerful men attached to the court of the Emperor of Japan in pre-Meiji eras. Even during those years in which the court's actual influence outside the palace walls was minimal, the hierarchic organization persisted.

In general, this elite group included only three to four men at a time. These were hereditary courtiers whose experience and background would have brought them to the pinnacle of a life's career. During Go-Mizunoo's reign, this apex of the Daijō-kan included: Kampaku Kujō Yukiie (1608–1612), Kampaku Takatsukasa Nobuhisa (1612–1615), Kampaku Nijō Akizane (1615–1619), Kampaku Kujō Yukiie (1619–1623), Kampaku Konoe Nobuhiro (1623–1629), and Kampaku Ichijō Akiyoshi (1629).

== Eras ==
The years of Go-Mizunoo's reign are more specifically identified by more than one era name or nengō: Keichō (1596–1615), Genna (1615–1624), and Kan'ei (1624–1644).

== Ancestry ==
Ancestors of Emperor Go-Mizunoo

8. Emperor Ōgimachi (1517–1593)
4. Prince Masahito (1552–1586)
9. Madenokōji Fusako (d. 1581)
2. Emperor Go-Yōzei (1571–1617)
10.Kanshūji Haruhide (1523–1577)
5. Kanshūji Haruko (1553–1620)
11. Awaya Motoko
1. Emperor Go-Mizunoo
12. Konoe Taneie (1502–1566)
6. Konoe Sakihisa (1536–1612)
13. Koga Keiko
3. Konoe Sakiko (1575–1630)
7. Takeda

== See also ==
- Emperor of Japan
- Imperial cult
- List of Emperors of Japan
- Sentō Imperial Palace
- Shugakuin Imperial Villa

== Notes ==
Japanese Imperial kamon — a stylized chrysanthemum blossom

Regnal titles
Preceded by Emperor Go-Yōzei	Emperor of Japan: Go-Mizunoo; 1611–1629	Succeeded by Empress Meishō
