= Tokugawa Iemitsu =

Japanese Samurai, Daimyo and Military leader of Japan from 1623 to 1651

Senior First Rank Tokugawa Iemitsu
- 徳川 家光
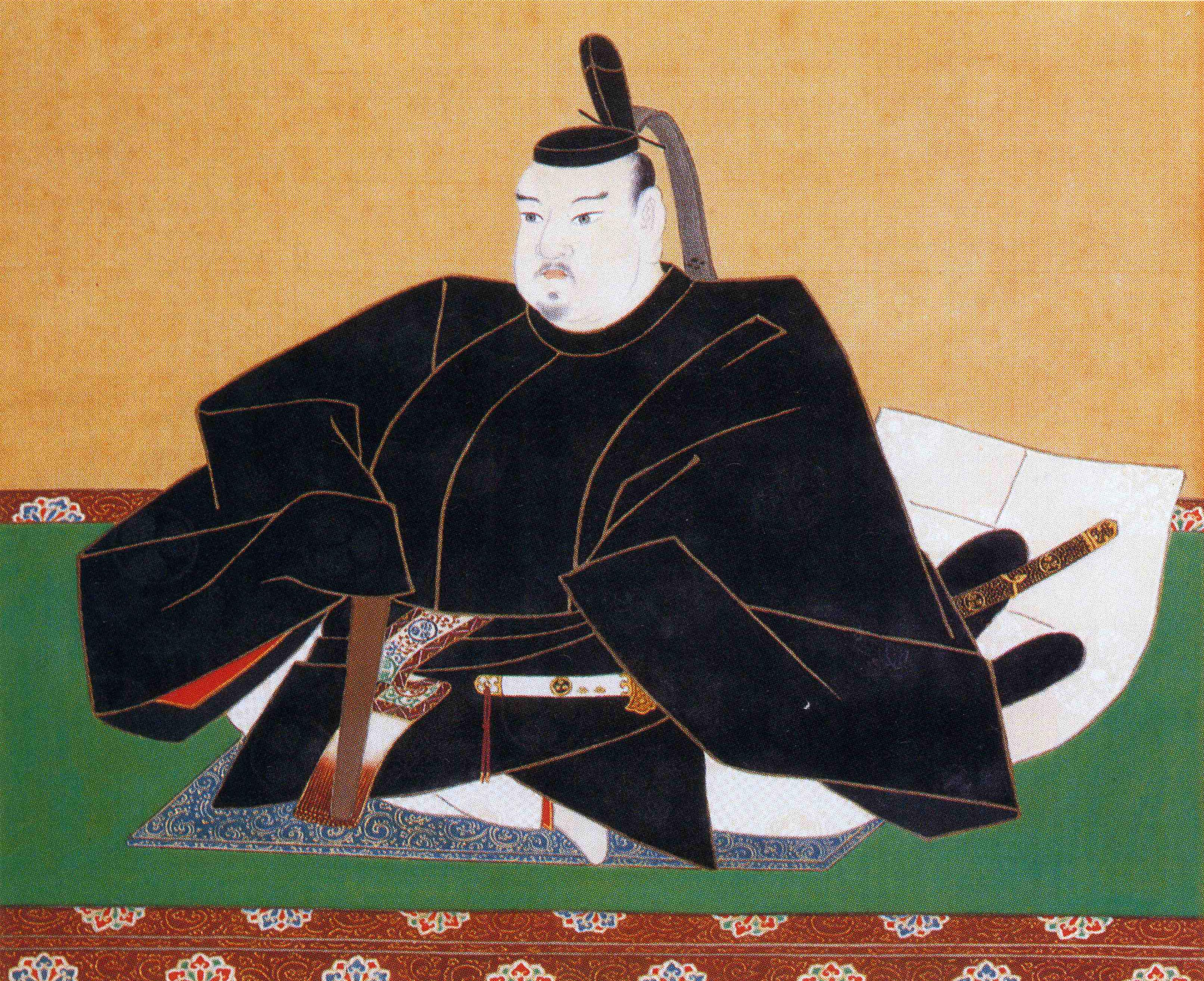

Shōgun
- In office 23 August 1623 – 8 June 1651
- Monarchs: Go-Mizunoo; Meishō; Go-Kōmyō
- Preceded by: Tokugawa Hidetada
- Succeeded by: Tokugawa Ietsuna

Personal details
- Born: 12 August 1604 Edo, Tokugawa shogunate (now Tokyo, Japan)
- Died: 8 June 1651 (aged 46) Edo, Tokugawa shogunate
- Children: Chiyohime; Tokugawa Ietsuna; Tokugawa Tsunashige; Tokugawa Tsunayoshi; Tsurumatsu; Among others...
- Parents: Tokugawa Hidetada; Oeyo
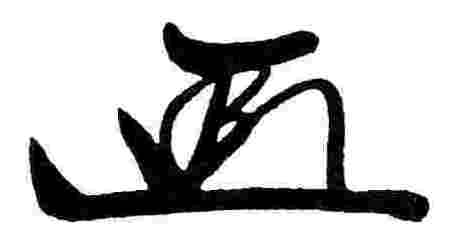
- Signature

Tokugawa Iemitsu (Note: Japanese pronunciation: [to.kɯꜜ.ɡa.wa | i.eꜜ.mʲi.tsɯ, to.kɯ.ɡa.wa i.eꜜ.mʲi.tsɯ, -ŋa.wa-]) (徳川 家光; 12 August 1604 – 8 June 1651) was a Japanese samurai, daimyo and the third shōgun of the Tokugawa dynasty. He was the eldest son of Tokugawa Hidetada with Oeyo, and the grandson of Tokugawa Ieyasu. Lady Kasuga was his wet nurse, who acted as his political adviser and was at the forefront of shogunate negotiations with the Imperial court. Iemitsu ruled from 1623 to 1651; during this period he crucified Christians, expelled all Europeans from Japan and closed the borders of the country, a foreign policy that continued for over 200 years after its institution.

== Early life (1604–1617) ==
Tokugawa Iemitsu was born prematurely on 12 August 1604. He was the eldest son of Tokugawa Hidetada and grandson of the last great unifier of Japan, the first Tokugawa shōgun Tokugawa Ieyasu. He was the first member of the Tokugawa family born after Tokugawa Ieyasu became shōgun. (There was some rumour said that he was not Hidetada's son but Ieyasu's son with Kasuga no Tsubone).

Not much is known of Iemitsu's early life; his childhood name was Takechiyo (竹千代). He had two sisters, Senhime and Masako, and a brother, who would become a rival, Tadanaga. Tadanaga was his parents' favorite. However, Ieyasu made it clear that Iemitsu would be next in line as shōgun after Hidetada.

He was said to have been sickly from birth.

An obsolete spelling of his given name is Iyemitsu.

== Family ==
Parents

- Father: Tokugawa Hidetada (徳川 秀忠), May 2, 1581 – March 14, 1632
- Mother: Lady Oeyo (於江与; 1573 – September 15, 1626)
  - Sibling from Mother: Toyotomi Sadako (1592–1658), adopted by Toyotomi Hideyoshi and Yodo-dono later married Kujō Yukiie, daughter of Toyotomi Hidekatsu
- Wet nurse: Lady Kasuga (春日局, Kasuga no Tsubone, 1579 – October 26, 1643)

Consorts and issue:

- Wife: Takatsukasa Takako (1622–1683) later Honriin, Takatsukasa Nobufusa's daughter
- Concubine: Ofuri no Kata (d. 1640) later Jishōin (自証院)
  - Chiyohime (千代姫, 29 April 1637 – 10 January 1699), first daughter
- Concubine: Oraku no Kata (1621–1653) later Hōjuin (宝樹院), Aoki Toshinaga's daughter (青木利長娘)
  - Tokugawa Ietsuna (徳川 家綱, 7 September 1641 – 4 June 1680), first son
- Concubine: Omasa no Kata (おまさの方)
  - Tokugawa Kamematsu (17 April 1643– 2 September 1647), second son
- Concubine: Onatsu no Kata (順性院; 1622–1683) later Junshōin (順性院), Fujieda Shigeya's daughter (藤枝重家娘)
  - Tokugawa Tsunashige (徳川 綱重, 28 June 1644 - 29 October 1678), third son
- Concubine: Otama no Kata (1627–1705) later Keishoin (桂昌院), Honjo Sonsei's daughter (本庄宗正)
  - Tokugawa Tsunayoshi (徳川 綱吉, February 23, 1646 – February 19, 1709), fourth son
- Concubine: Orisa no Kata (d. 1674) later Jokoin (定光院)
  - Tokugawa Tsurumatsu (1 February 1647 – 22 August 1648), fifth son
- Concubine: Oman no Kata (1624–1711) later Eikoin (永光院)
- Concubine: Okoto no Kata (1614–1691) later Hoshin'in (芳心院)

Adopted Daughters:

  - Kametsuruhime (1613–1630), daughter of Tamahime with Maeda Toshitsune and married Mōri Tadahiro, son of Mōri Tadamasa of Tsuyama Domain
  - Tsuruhime (1618–1671), daughter of Matsudaira Tadanao and married Kujō Michifusa had 3 daughters: the first married Kujō Kaneharu the second and the third married Asano Tsunaakira
  - Manhime (1620–1700), daughter of Tamahime with Maeda Toshitsune and married Asano Mitsuakira had 3 sons: Asano Tsunaakira, Asano Naganao, Asano Nagateru
  - Oohime, daughter of Tokugawa Yorifusa and married Maeda Mitsutaka had 1 son: Maeda Tsunanori
  - Tsuhime (1636–1717) daughter of Ikeda Mitsumasa and married Ichijō Norisuke had 1 son: Ichijō Kaneteru

== Tokugawa heir (1617–1623) ==
Iemitsu came of age in 1617 and dropped his childhood name in favor of Tokugawa Iemitsu. He also was installed officially as the heir to the Tokugawa shogunate. The only person to contest this position was his younger brother Tokugawa Tadanaga. A fierce rivalry began to develop between the brothers.

From an early age Iemitsu practiced the shūdō tradition. However, in 1620, he had a falling out with his homosexual lover, Sakabe Gozaemon, a childhood friend and retainer, aged twenty-one, and murdered him as they shared a bathtub.

He married Takatsukasa Takako, daughter of Takatsukasa Nobufusa at 12 December 1623. His relationship with Takako was good but Takako had three miscarriages.

== Shogunal regency (1623–1632) ==
In 1623, when Iemitsu was nineteen, Hidetada abdicated the post of shōgun in his favor. Hidetada continued to rule as Ōgosho (retired shōgun), but Iemitsu nevertheless assumed a role as formal head of the bakufu bureaucracy. He declared in front of the various daimyo, "Unlike my grandfather and father, it was decided from birth that I would become a shogun." This is said to be based on the advice of Date Masamune.

In 1626, shōgun Iemitsu and retired shōgun Hidetada visited Emperor Go-Mizunoo, Empress Masako (Hidetada's daughter and Iemitsu's sister), and Imperial Princess Meishō in Kyoto. Shōgun Iemitsu made lavish grants of gold and money to the court nobles and the court itself. Yet relations with Go-Mizunoo deteriorated after the Purple Robe Incident (紫衣事件, shi-e jiken), during which the Emperor was accused of having bestowed honorific purple garments to more than ten priests despite an edict which banned them for two years (probably in order to break the bond between the Emperor and religious circles). The shogunate intervened, making the bestowing of the garments invalid. When Lady Kasuga and Masako broke a taboo by visiting the imperial court as a commoner, Go-Mizunoo abdicated, embarrassed, and Meisho became empress. The shōgun was now the uncle of the sitting monarch.

In 1629, the government banned the practice of kabuki due to samurai fighting over female performers, leading to the practice of wakashu kabuki, in which young boys performed the roles instead. This attracted the attention of Iemitsu, who showed interest in this wakashū kabuki, which reflected the contemporary samurai practice of shudō, (relationships between adult men and younger males) that were socially recognized in the Edo period. In 1652, one year after Iemitsu's death, wakashu kabuki was banned, also due to samurai fighting over the performers; Iemitsu's enjoyment of it helped to postpone its ban until after his death.

In Kan'ei 9, on the 24th day of the 2nd month (1632), Ōgosho Hidetada died, and Iemitsu could assume real power. Worried that his brother Tokugawa Tadanaga might assassinate him, however, he ruled carefully until his brother's death by seppuku in 1633.

== Shōgun (1632–1651) ==
Hidetada left his advisors, all veteran daimyō, to act as regents for Iemitsu. In 1633, after his brother's death, Iemitsu dismissed these men. In place of his father's advisors, Iemitsu appointed his childhood friends. With their help Iemitsu created a strong, centralized administration. This made him unpopular with many daimyō, but Iemitsu simply removed his opponents.

In 1635, Iemitsu issued the second version of the buke shohatto, a collection of edicts dictating the powers and responsibilities of the daimyō. The original version had first been promulgated in 1615 under Hidetada. Iemitsu expanded the edicts to define the relationship between the han, the feudal domains of the daimyō, and the shogunate, increasing the number of edicts from thirteen to twenty-one. These new edicts further restricted the powers of the daimyō, preventing them from interfering with highways that entered their domains, constructing barriers, imposing embargoes, or building ships larger than 500 koku. Furthermore, the edicts gave bakufu officials control over all criminal matters, leading to the establishment of the hyōjōsho, a tribunal which settled such matters, in the same year. Some edicts addressed separate matters, such as expressing support for filial piety, hostility towards Christianity, and establishing rules on who could wear certain clothes or ride in palanquins.

One major change instituted by the buke shohatto was the establishment of the sankin-kōtai system, which forced daimyō to reside in Edo in alternating sequence, spending a certain amount of time in Edo, and a certain amount of time in their home provinces. The system at first originally applied to the tozama daimyō, but expanded to apply to all daimyō by 1642. One of the key goals of this policy was to prevent the daimyō from amassing too much wealth or power by separating them from their home provinces, and by forcing them to regularly devote a sizable sum to funding the immense travel expenses associated with the journey, along with a large entourage, to and from Edo. The system also involved the daimyōs' wives and heirs remaining in Edo, disconnected from their lord and from their home province, serving essentially as hostages who might be harmed or killed if the daimyō were to plot rebellion against the shogunate.

=== Anti-Europeanization edicts ===
The century-long presence of Catholic traders and missionaries in Japan ended in the 1630s when Iemitsu ordered the expulsion of nearly every European from the country. European access to trade relations with Japan was restricted to one Dutch ship each year. Iemitsu's policies on this matter were reinforced after the execution of two Portuguese men who came to plead for the re-establishment of Japan's earlier foreign trade policy. By the end of the 1630s, Iemitsu had issued a series of edicts more extensively detailing a system of restrictions on the flow of people, goods, and information in and out of the country.

Over the course of the 1630s, Iemitsu issued a series of edicts restricting Japan's dealings with the outside world. The most famous of those edicts was the so-called Sakoku Edict of 1635, which contained the main restrictions introduced by Iemitsu. With it, he forbade every Japanese ship and person to travel to another country, or to return to Japanese shores. The punishment for violation was death. Japanese, who had since the 1590s traveled extensively in East and Southeast Asia (and, in rare instances, much farther afield), were now forbidden from leaving the country or returning, under pain of death.

The edict offered lavish gifts and awards for anyone who could provide information about priests and their followers who secretly practiced and spread their religion across the country. Furthermore, every newly arrived ship was required to be thoroughly examined for Catholic priests and followers. The document pays extremely close attention to every detail regarding incoming foreign ships. For example, merchants coming from abroad had to submit a list of the goods they were bringing with them before being granted permission to trade. Additional provisions specified details of the timing and logistics of trade. For example, one clause declares that the "date of departure homeward for foreign ships shall not be later than the twentieth day of the ninth month". In addition to this, Iemitsu forbade alterations of the set price for raw silk and thus made sure that competition between trading cities was brought to a minimum.

In 1637, an armed revolt arose against Iemitsu's anti-Christian policies in Shimabara, but there were other reasons involved, such as overly-high taxation and cruel treatment of peasants by the local lord. The period domestic unrest is known as the Shimabara Rebellion. Thousands were killed in the shogunate's suppression of the revolt and countless more were executed afterwards. The fact that many of the rebels were Christians was used by the Bakufu as a convenient pretext for expelling the Portuguese and restricting the Dutch East India Company to Dejima in Nagasaki.

Following the edicts, Japan remained very much connected to international commerce, information, and cultural exchange, though only through four avenues. Nagasaki was the center of trade and other dealings with the Dutch East India Company, and with independent Chinese merchants. Satsuma Domain controlled relations with the Ryūkyū Kingdom (and through Ryūkyū, had access to Chinese goods and information, as well as products from further afield through alternative trade routes that passed through Ryūkyū), while Tsushima Domain handled diplomatic and trade relations with Joseon-dynasty Korea, and Matsumae Domain managed communications with the Ainu, the indigenous people of Hokkaido, Sakhalin and the Kuril Islands, as well as limited communication with related peoples on the mainland close to Sakhalin. Japan in this period has often been described as "closed", or under sakoku (鎖国, "chained country"), but since the 1980s, if not earlier, scholars have argued for the use of terms such as 'kaikin" (海禁, "maritime restrictions"), emphasizing the fact that Japan was not "closed" to the outside world, but was in fact very actively engaged with the outside world, albeit through a limited set of avenues. However, the measures Iemitsu enacted were so powerful that it was not until the 1850s that Japanese ports opened to a wider range of trading partners, Westerners were free to settle and travel within Japan, and Japanese were once more free to travel overseas.

=== Relations with Imperial court ===
In 1643 Empress Meisho abdicated the throne. She was succeeded by her younger half-brother (Go-Mizunoo's son by a consort) Emperor Go-Kōmyō, who disliked the shogunate for its violent and barbaric ways. He repeatedly made insulting comments about Iemitsu and his eldest son and heir, Tokugawa Ietsuna.

== Death ==
In 1651 shōgun Iemitsu died at the age of 47 from a stroke, being the first Tokugawa shōgun whose reign ended with death and not abdication. He was accorded a posthumous name of Taiyūin, also known as Daiyūin (大猷院) and buried in Taiyu-in Temple, Nikko. Iemitsu had expanded Nikkō Tōshō-gū prior to his death, but was careful to avoid iconography for his mausoleum that could be seen as surpassing that of his grandfather. He was succeeded by his eldest son and heir, Tokugawa Ietsuna.

== Honours ==
- Senior First Rank (July 4, 1651; posthumous)

== Eras of Iemitsu's bakufu ==
The years in which Iemitsu was shōgun are more specifically identified by more than one era name or nengō.

- Genna (1615–1624)
- Kan'ei (1624–1644)
- Shōhō (1644–1648)
- Keian (1648–1652)

== In popular culture ==
- Iemitsu's rivalry with his brother Tokugawa Tadanaga over the Shogunate forms a part of the television series The Yagyu Conspiracy and is the basis for the film Shogun's Samurai. At the end of the film, shōgun Iemitsu is killed and decapitated by Yagyū Jūbei in an act of revenge for his father Yagyū Munenori's betrayal).
- In Basilisk, the retired Shogun Ieyasu had to decide which grandson will become the third Shogun: Takechiyo, as Iemitsu was called in his youth, or Kunichiyo, as Tadanaga was known in his youth. To determine this, he has two rival ninja clans, the Iga and the Kouga, fight a proxy war, with each side representing one grandson.
- Tokugawa Iemitsu appears as the ruling shōgun in the Legends of Tomorrow episode "Shogun", portrayed by Stephen Oyoung. He is to be married to Masako Yamashiro and takes the Atom's (Brandon Routh) exosuit. Before the marriage can take place, the Legends take on him and his samurai, with Steel (Nick Zano) dealing the final blow, destroying the Atom suit and thus, stopping Iemitsu.
- Iemitsu appears as the protagonist of the action role-playing video game Nioh 3, developed by Team Ninja and published by Koei Tecmo. In the game, players control Iemitsu during his youth under the childhood name Takechiyo. While the character's historical identity is fixed, the player may customize the protagonist's physical appearance through the game's character creation system. The story portrays Takechiyo confronting various supernatural threats, including yōkai, within various periods of Japan.

== Ancestry ==
Ancestors of Tokugawa Iemitsu

8. Matsudaira Hirotada (1526–1549)
4. Tokugawa Ieyasu, 1st Tokugawa Shōgun (1543-1616)
9. O-dai no Kata (1528–1602)
2. Tokugawa Hidetada, 2nd Tokugawa Shōgun (1579-1632)
10. Tozuka Tadaharu
5. Lady Saigō (1552-1589)
11. Saigō
1. Tokugawa Iemitsu, 3rd Tokugawa Shōgun (1604-1651)
12. Azai Hisamasa (1526-1573)
6. Azai Nagamasa (1545-1573)
13. Iguchi Ono (1527-1573)
3. Oeyo (1573-1626)
14. Oda Nobuhide (1511-1552)
7. Oichi (1547-1583)
15. Iwamuro

== Notes ==
Military offices
Preceded by Tokugawa Hidetada	Shōgun: Tokugawa Iemitsu; 1623–1651	Succeeded by Tokugawa Ietsuna
