= Shugakuin Imperial Villa =

Set of gardens and outbuildings in Kyoto, Japan

- Shugaku-in Imperial Villa (修学院離宮, Shugaku-in Rikyū)
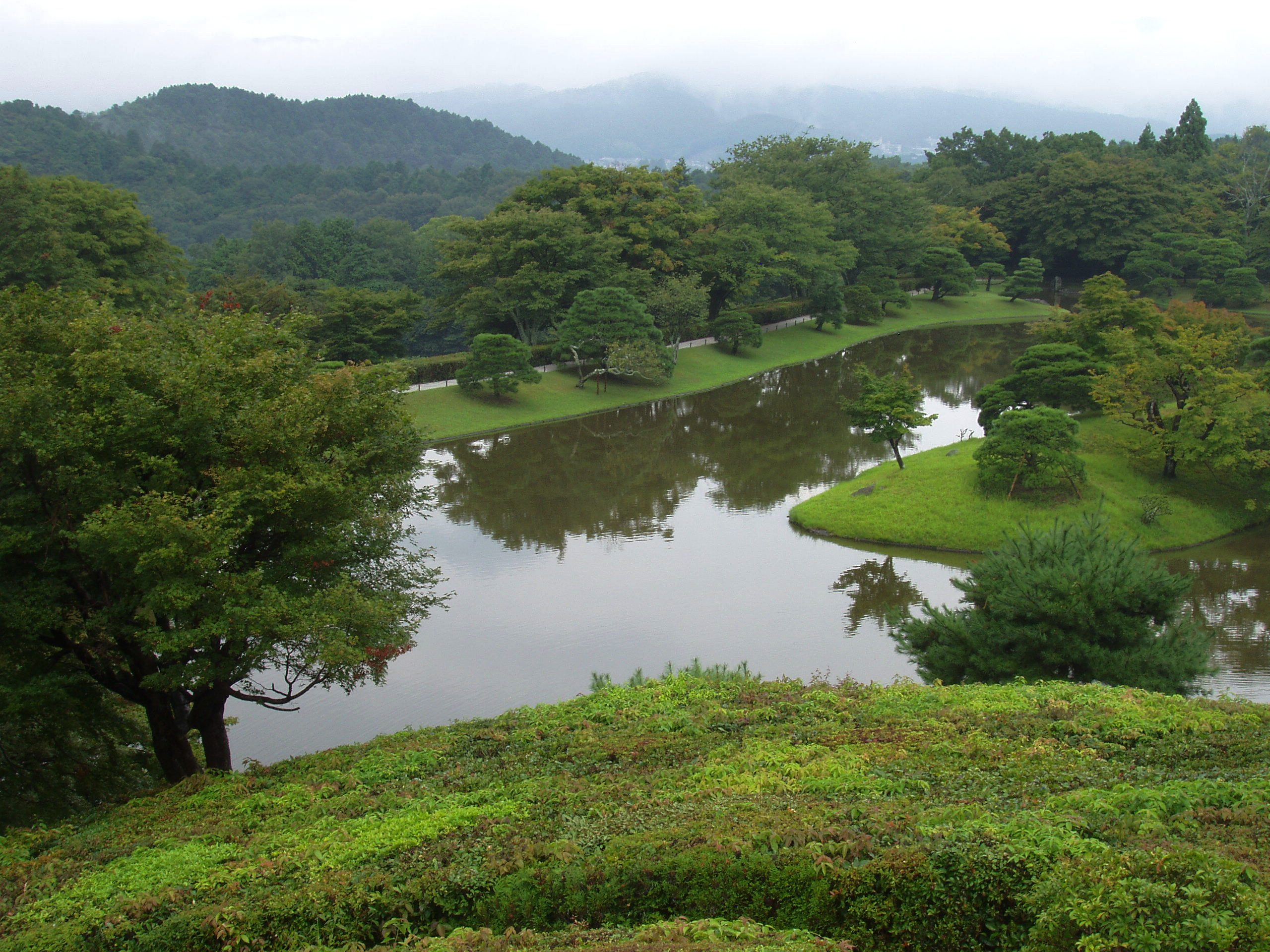
- Upper Garden pond
- Interactive map of Shugakuin Imperial Villa
- Type: Japanese garden
- Location: Kyoto, Japan
- Coordinates: 35°03′13″N 135°48′06″E
- Created: 1655

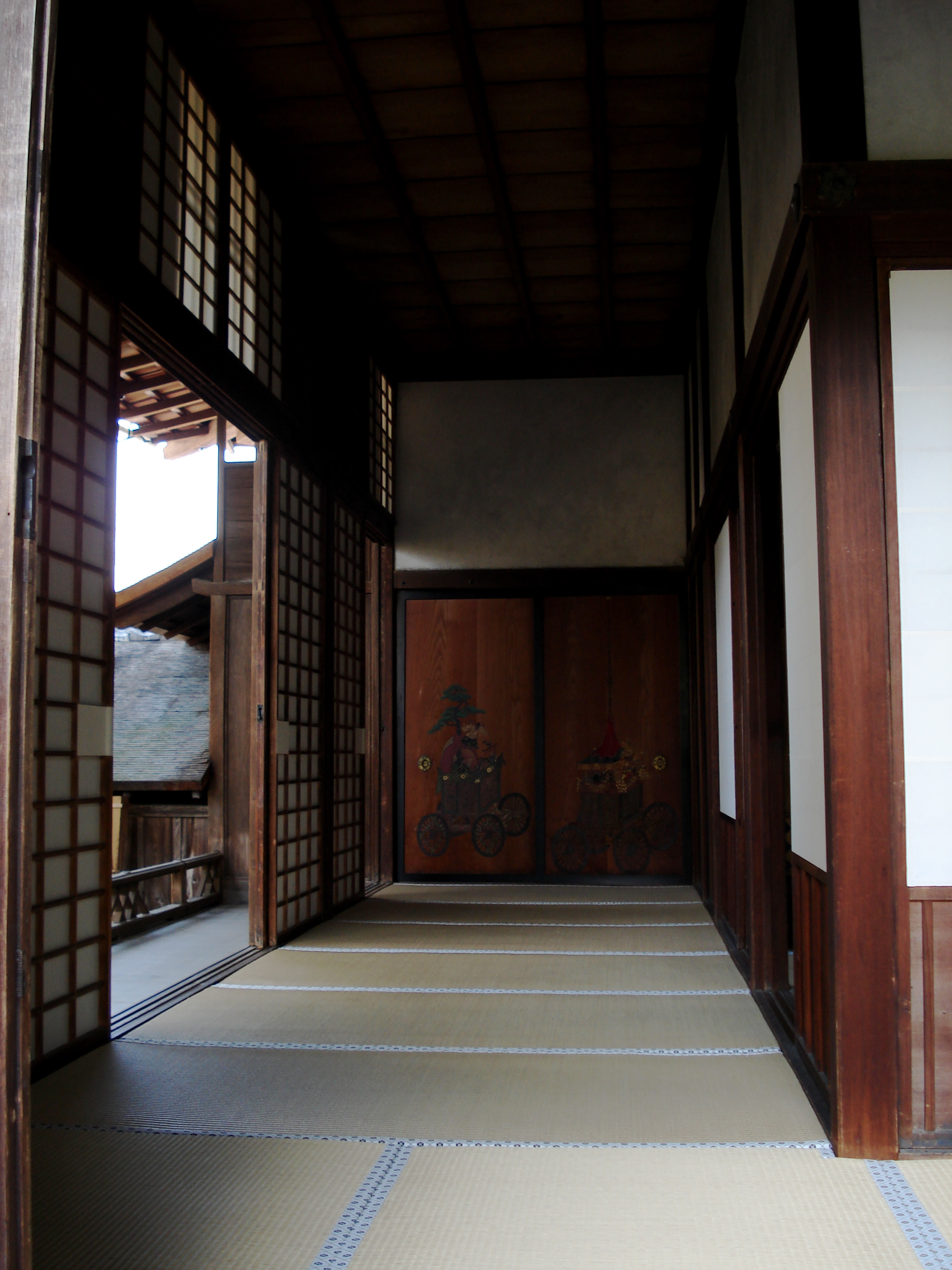

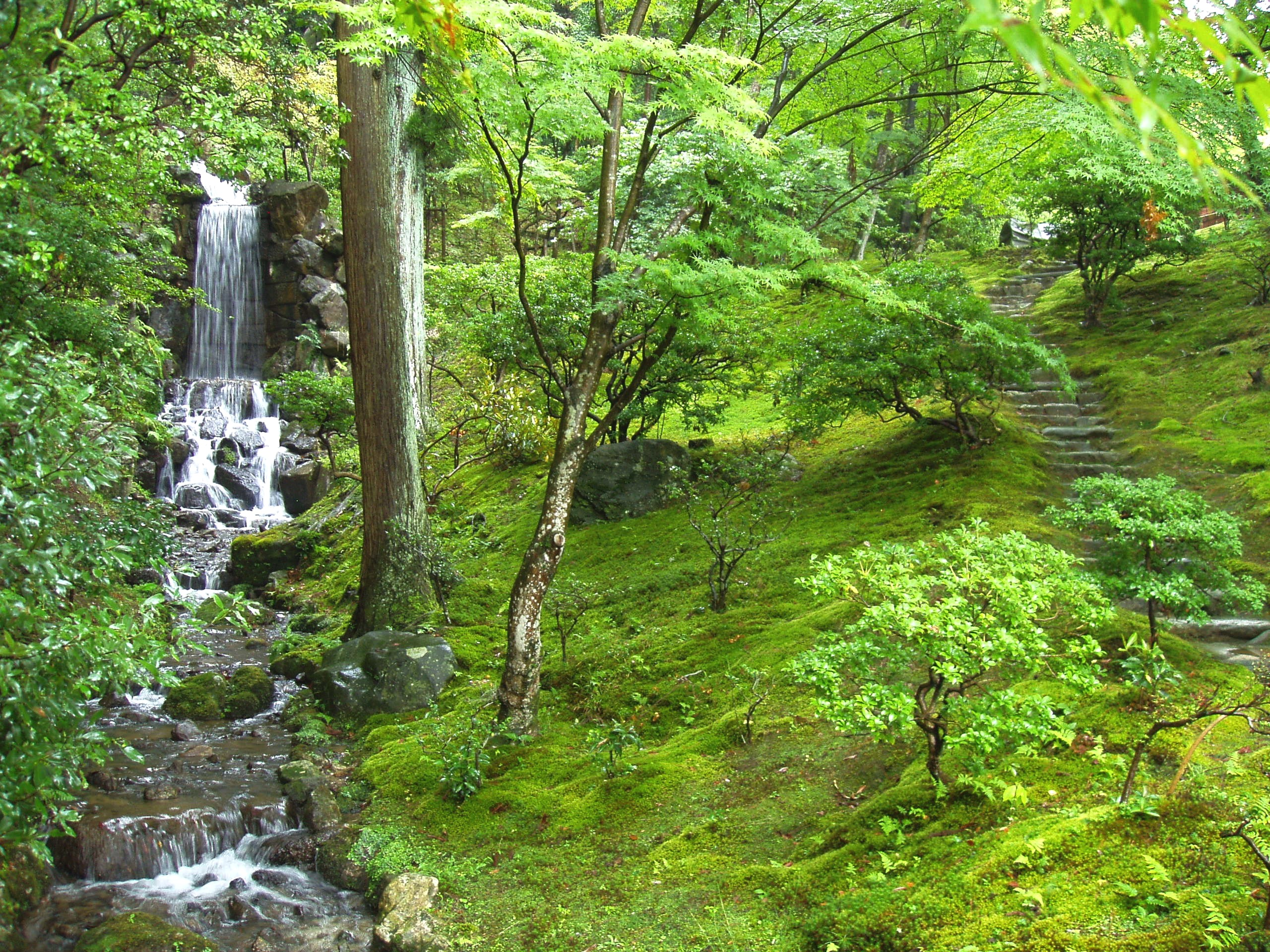
Upper Garden pond

The Shugaku-in Imperial Villa (修学院離宮, Shugaku-in Rikyū), or Shugaku-in Detached Palace, is a set of gardens and outbuildings (mostly teahouses) in the hills of the eastern suburbs of Kyoto, Japan (separate from the Kyoto Imperial Palace). It is one of Japan's most important large-scale cultural treasures; its gardens are one of the great masterpieces of Japanese gardening.

Although styled as a "detached palace", often translated as "imperial villa", there were never any large-scale buildings there, as there are at the Katsura Imperial Villa. The 53-hectare (133 acre) grounds actually include three separate gardens, the Lower Garden, Middle Garden (a later addition), and Upper Garden, of which the latter is the most important.

The Imperial Household Agency administers it, and accepts visitors by appointment.

== History ==
The Shugaku-in was originally constructed by the retired Emperor Go-Mizunoo, starting in 1655, with the initial construction completed in 1659. The site had been previously occupied by the Enshō-ji nunnery, founded by his oldest daughter, Princess Ume-no-miya; it was moved to Nara to make room for Go-Mizunoo's creation.

The Upper Garden contained a large artificial pond, created by building an earthen dam across a ravine; the pond contains a number of small islands. Unlike the typical Japanese garden, it is a very large stroll garden, making extensive use of the technique of borrowing of scenery ("shakkei"). The Lower Garden was originally much more informal than what is now there; originally it was more of a simple arrival station for visiting guests.

After Go-Mizunoo's death, his daughter Princess Mitsuko became a nun, and established another temple there, the Ryinku-ji, in what later became the Middle Garden. The gardens and buildings then fell into disrepair, with some of the buildings either being destroyed or removed. During the rule of Tokugawa Ienari, the 11th Tokugawa shōgun, the Shūgaku-in was thoroughly renovated.

In 1883, the Shugaku-in came under the control of the Imperial Household Department (as it was then), and the large building which is currently in the Middle Garden was moved there. Other changes, such as the building of fences around the Lower and Middle Gardens, and the enclosure of the paths between them, soon followed, giving the Shūgaku-in the character it has today.

== Garden features ==
The Lower Garden consists of an outer, landscaped area with walking paths, and an inner garden with villa, separated by a series of two bamboo fences each with a simple, wooden doorway. The villa (Jugetsu-kan) is irregularly shaped, with three principal rooms of 15, 12, and 5 tatami mats in size; the largest contains a raised section for the emperor, as well as a drawing of "The Three Laughing Sages of Kokei" said to be by Ganku (1756–1839). The garden features a small brook and pond divided by a walkway embankment, and is set off from the villa by a region of coarse, white sand with white stepping-stones.

The Middle Garden contains an inner garden area with two principal buildings, again set within an outer and then inner fence. It features a fine pond predating the garden, with cascade and stone bridges. Rakushi-ken contains two principal rooms of 6 and 8 mats in size, and features two paintings by Kanō Tanshin. Kyaku-den, the reception hall, contains two principal rooms (12.5 and 10 mats) and an altar room (6.5 mats) added after the building was moved to this site in 1678 from the palace at Tofuku-monin. It contains a celebrated shelf of zelkova wood, known as the "Shelf of Mist", paintings by Kano Hidenobu, and fine paintings on wooden panels.

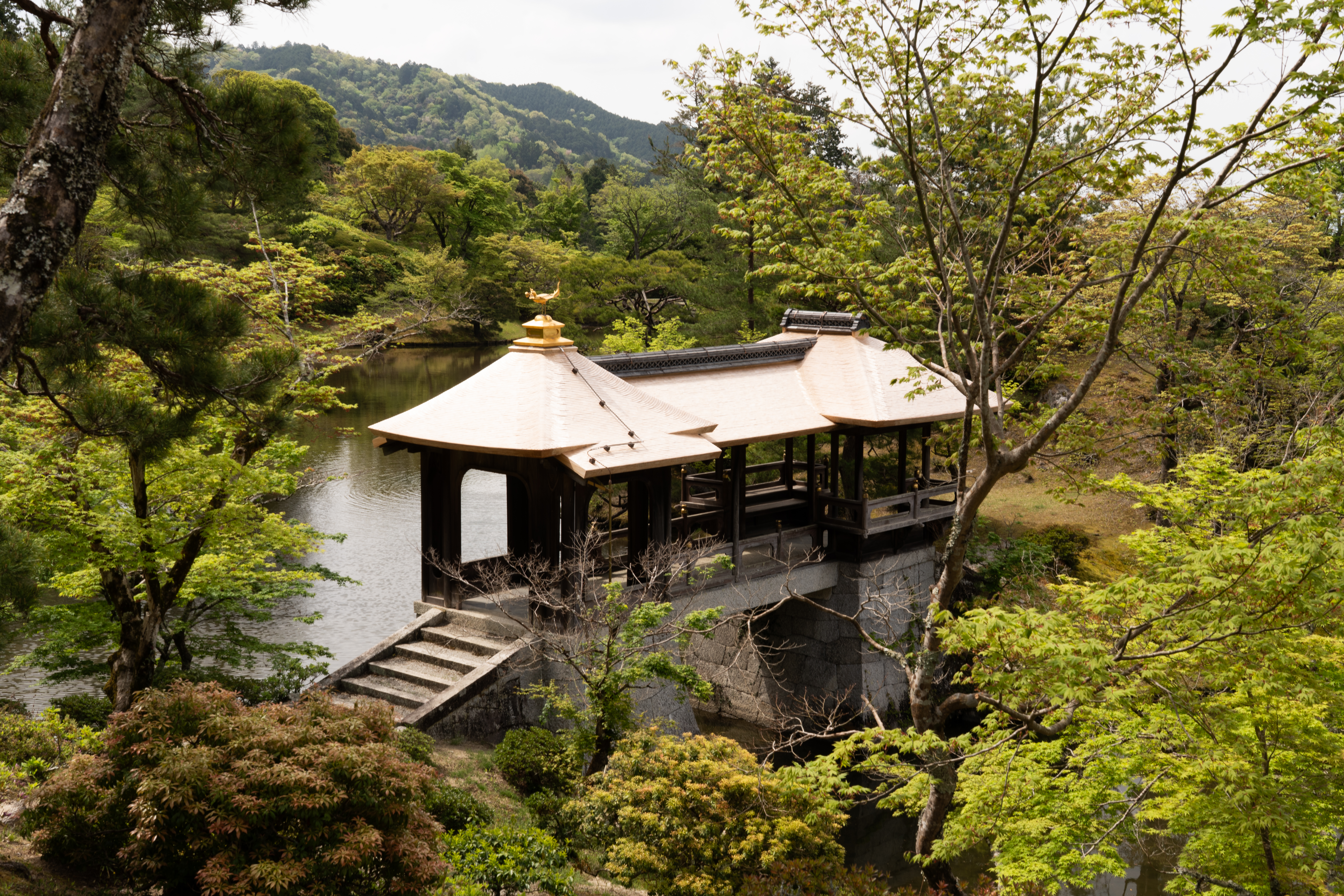
Chitose-bashi

The spectacular Upper Garden is reached through a simple gate and short climb through clipped shrubbery, at which point the entire garden vista is revealed. A simple pavilion of several rooms and wooden porch provides an vantage point, with views of the pond, its islands, and the surrounding Kyoto hills. The nearby waterfall is about 10 meters in height, built of rough-hewn stones, and set within a highly picturesque surrounding. The pond is ornamented with two major structures: Chitose-bashi, a relatively ornate bridge of two large, stone piers connected by a central walkway, each capped with a wooden pavilion, one of which sports a Chinese phoenix of gilt copper; and Kyusui-tei, a simple, single-room building (18 mats) which is original. The pond also features two smaller bridges, a stone boat-landing, and a second, smaller waterfall. The pond's west bank is long and remarkably monotonous, with lawn, trees, walkway, and clipped hedge running atop the large, earthen-work dam that created the pond.

The three gardens are linked by two straight allées, each perhaps 100 meters in length and lined by regular plantings of pine trees, that run through surrounding rice plantations and offer excellent views of both the plantations and the nearby hills.

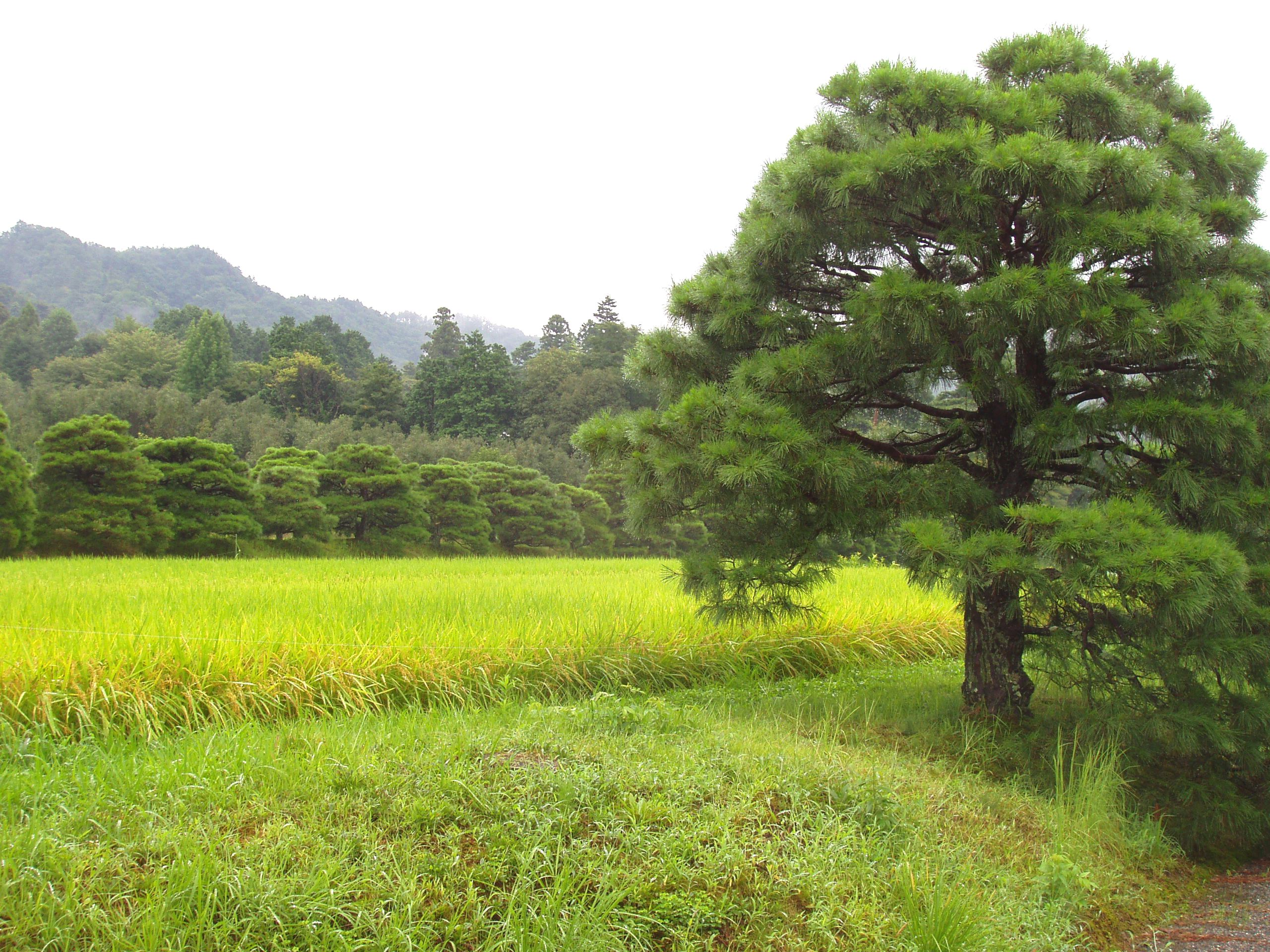
Allée

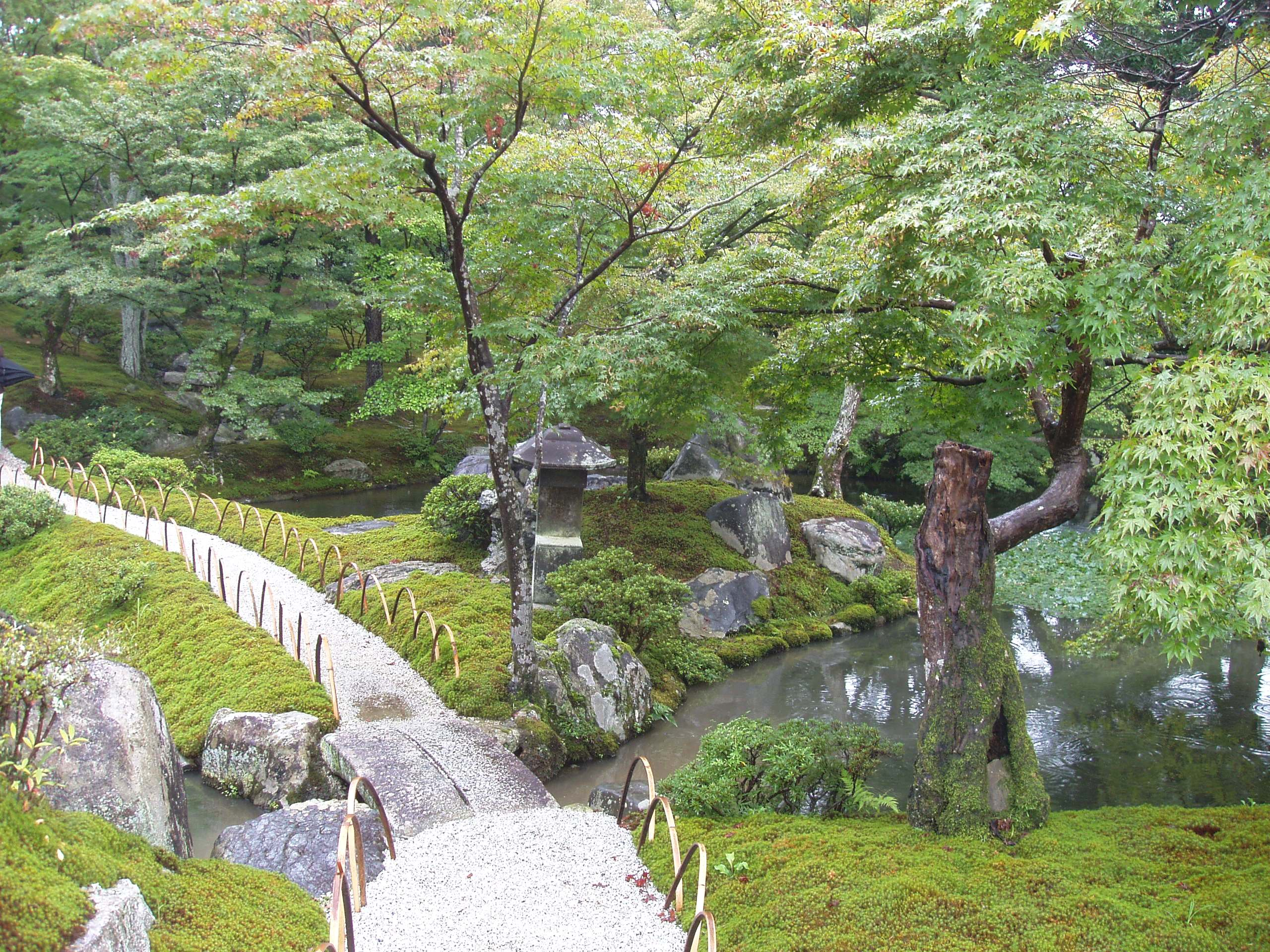
Lower Garden

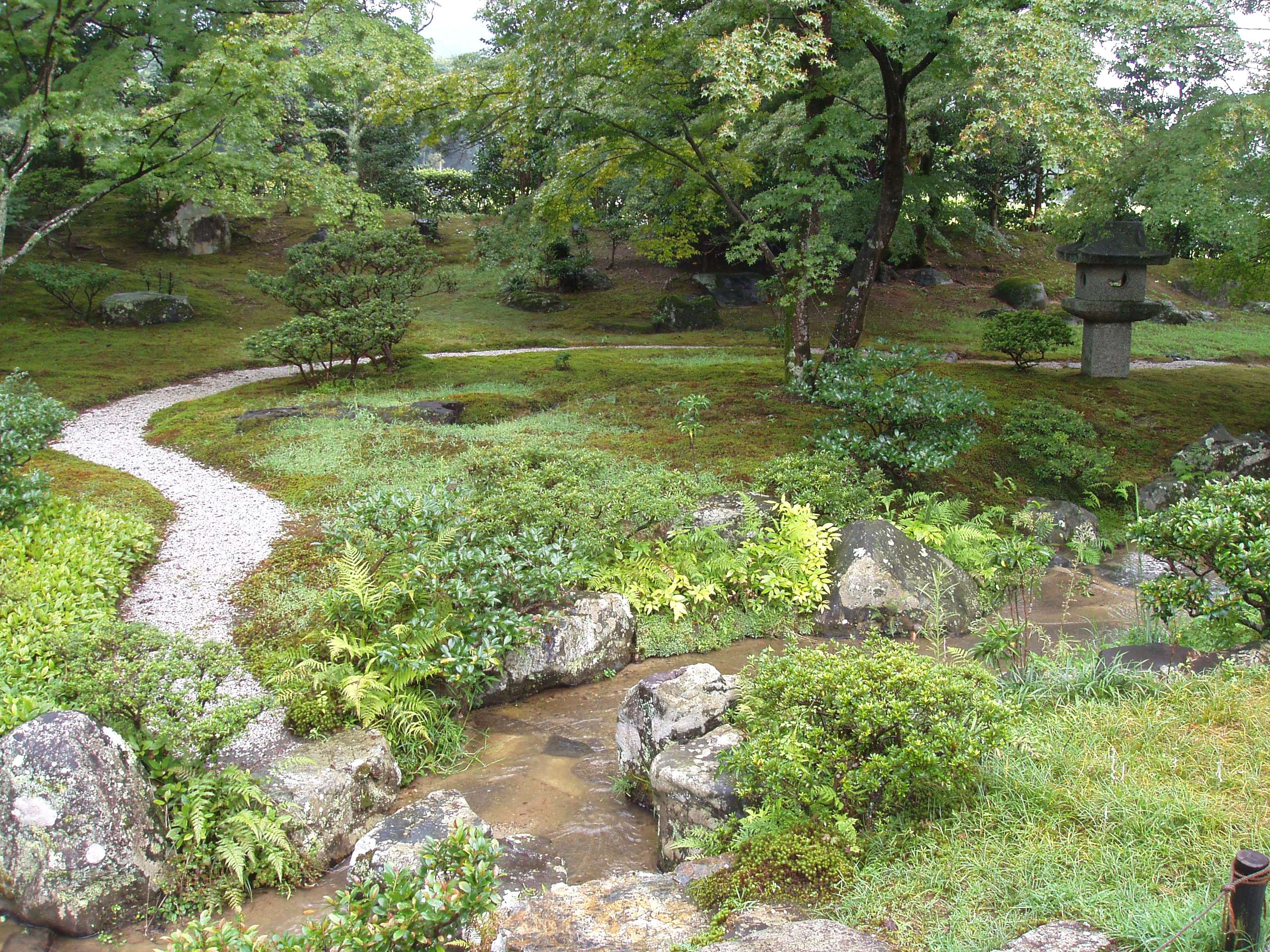
Lower Garden

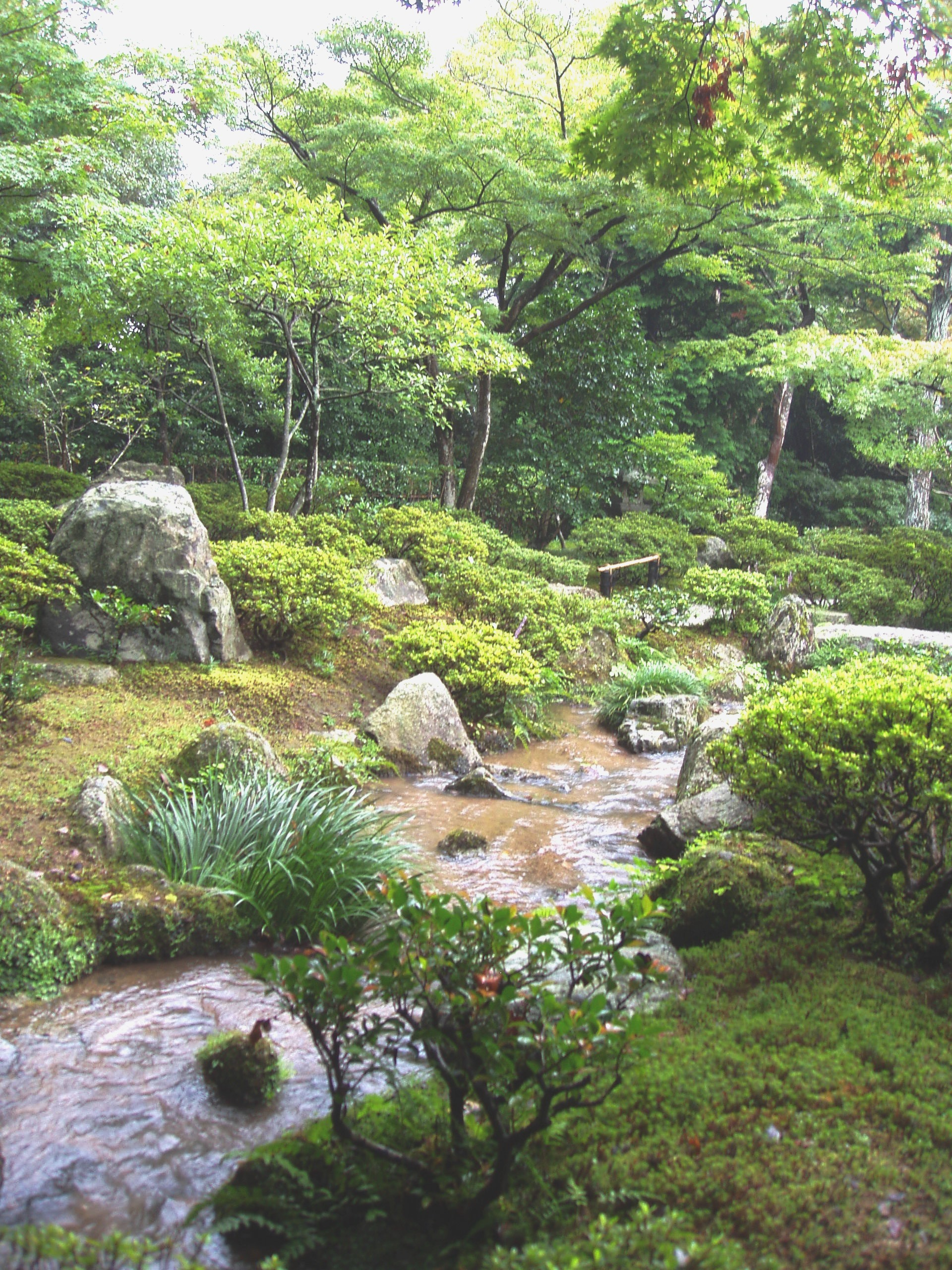
Middle Garden

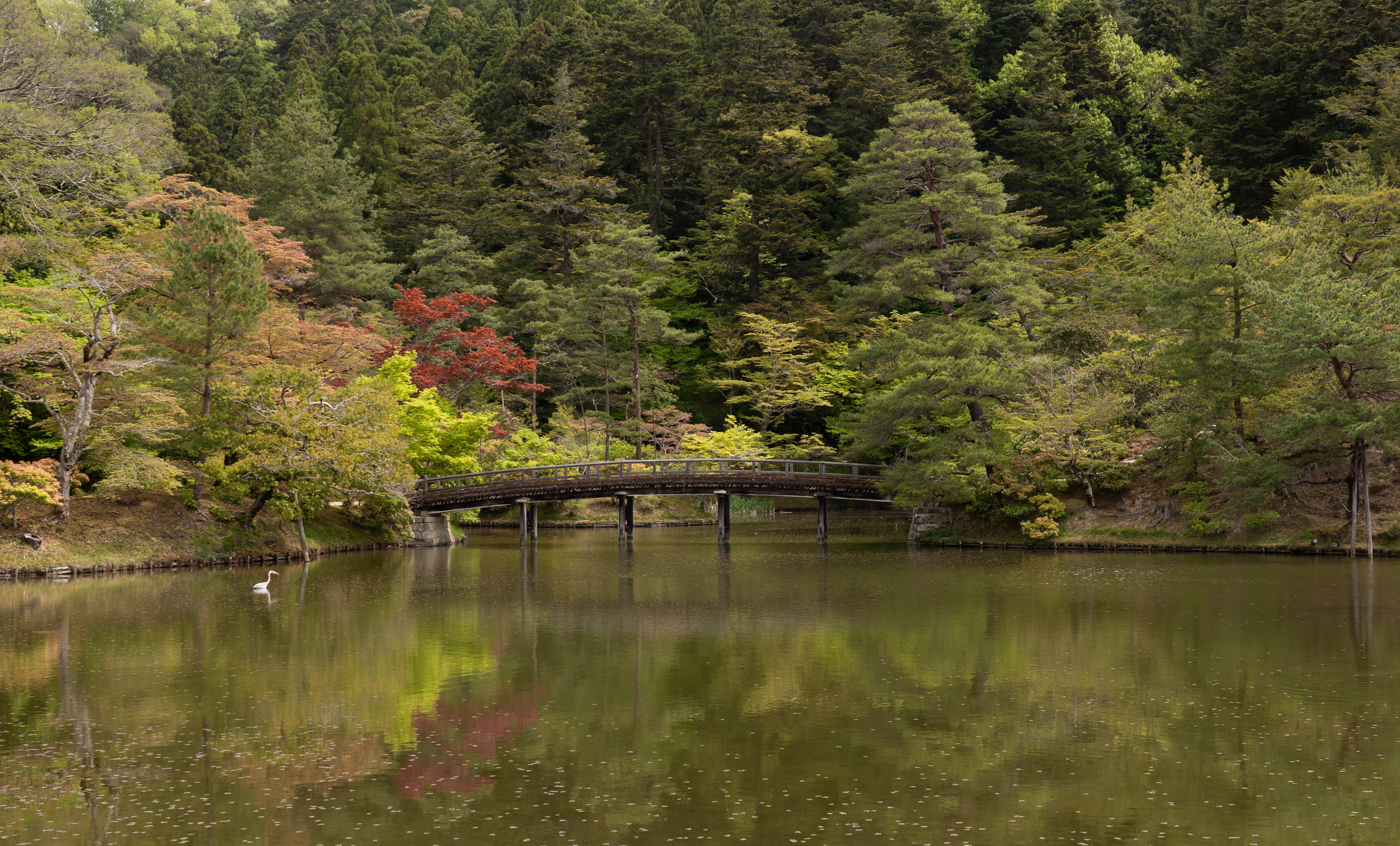
Upper Garden Bridge
