= Nijō Mitsuhira =

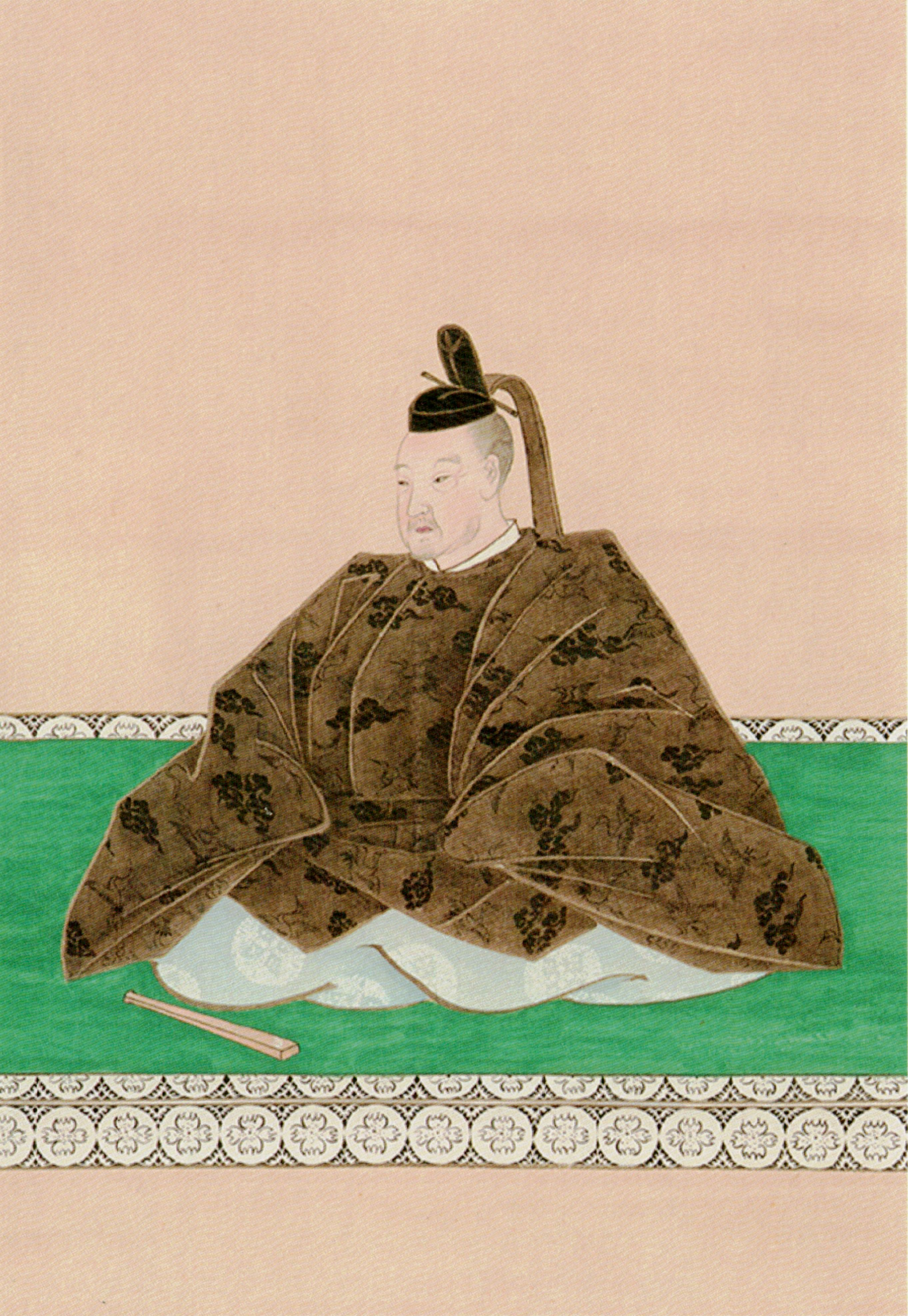
Portrait of Nijō Mitsuhira, artist unknown. Dōshisha University Historical Museum.

Nijō Mitsuhira (二条 光平; 1624 – 1682), son of Nijō Yasumichi, was a Japanese kugyō (court noble) of the early Edo period. He held regent positions kampaku from 1653 to 1663 and sesshō from 1663 to 1664. Nijō Tsunahira was his adopted son. With Imperial Fifth Princess Yoshiko, Emperor Go-Mizunoo's sixth daughter, he had a daughter married to Tokugawa Tsunashige of Kofu Domain.
