= Jikō-in =

Buddhist temple in Japan

- 慈光院
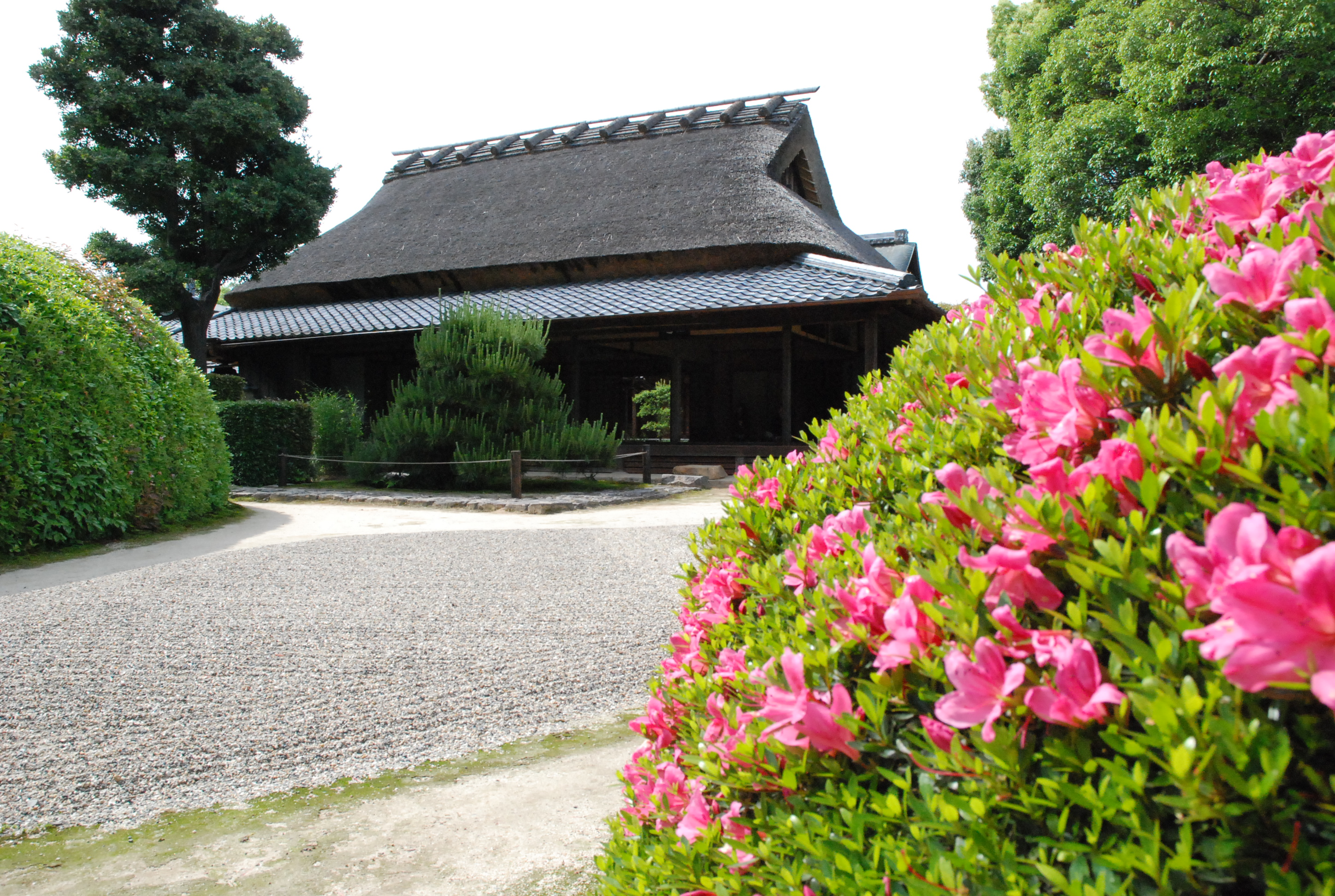
- Jikō-in

- Location within Nara Prefecture Location within Japan

Religion
- Affiliation: Buddhist
- Deity: Shaka Nyorai
- Rite: Daitokuji-branch of Rinzai school
- Status: functional

Location
- Location: 865 Koizumicho, Yamatokoriyama-shi, Nara-ken 639-1042
- Country: Japan
- Coordinates: 34°37′55.3″N 135°45′28.8″E

Architecture
- Founder: Katagiri Sadamasa
- Completed: 1663
- Important Cultural Property National Place of Scenic Beauty National Historic Site of Japan

Jikō-in (慈光院) is a Buddhist temple located in the Koizumi-chō neighborhood of the city of Yamatokōriyama, Nara Prefecture, Japan. It belongs to the Daitokuji-branch of the Rinzai school of Japanese Zen and its honzon is a statue of Shaka Nyorai. The sangō of the temple is Entsuzan (圓通山). The Jikō-in garden has been designated Place of Scenic Beauty and National Historic Site since 1934.

== Overview ==
The temple was founded by Katagiri Sadamasa, second daimyō of Koizumi Domain, who was better known under the name "Sekishu" as the founder of Sekishu-ryu school of the Japanese tea ceremony. He was the nephew of Katagiri Katsumoto and tea instructor to the fourth Shogun, Tokugawa Ietsuna, so his style became popular among the feudal ruling class of Japan at the time. Jikō-in was constructed in 1663 as the bodaiji memorial temple for his father, Katagiri Sadataka, and the 185th abbot of Daitoku-ji was its founding priest. The name of "Jikō-in" was taken from Katagiri Sadataka's dharma name Jikōin-den Setsutei Sōritsu Koji.

The temple gate was a structure salvaged from Settsu Ibaraki Castle, Katagiri Sadamasa's birthplace, after that castle was abolished under the Tokugawa shogunate's "One Castle per Province" edict.

The temple is located 1.4 kilometers northwest, or approximately 20-minutes on foot, from Yamato-Koizumi Station on the JR West Kansai Main Line.

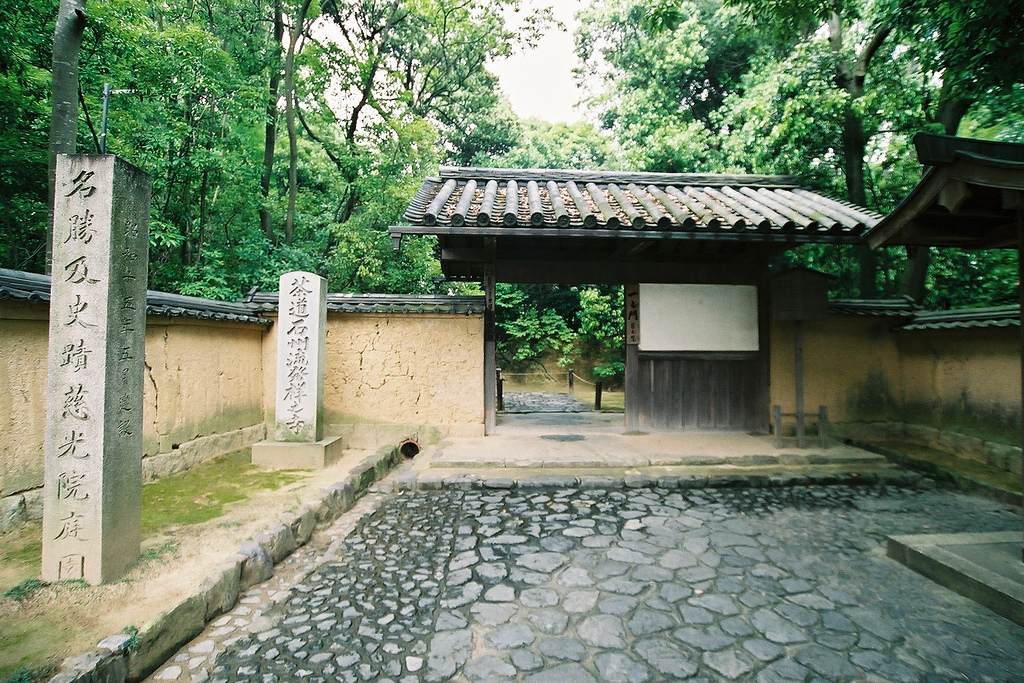
Entry Gate

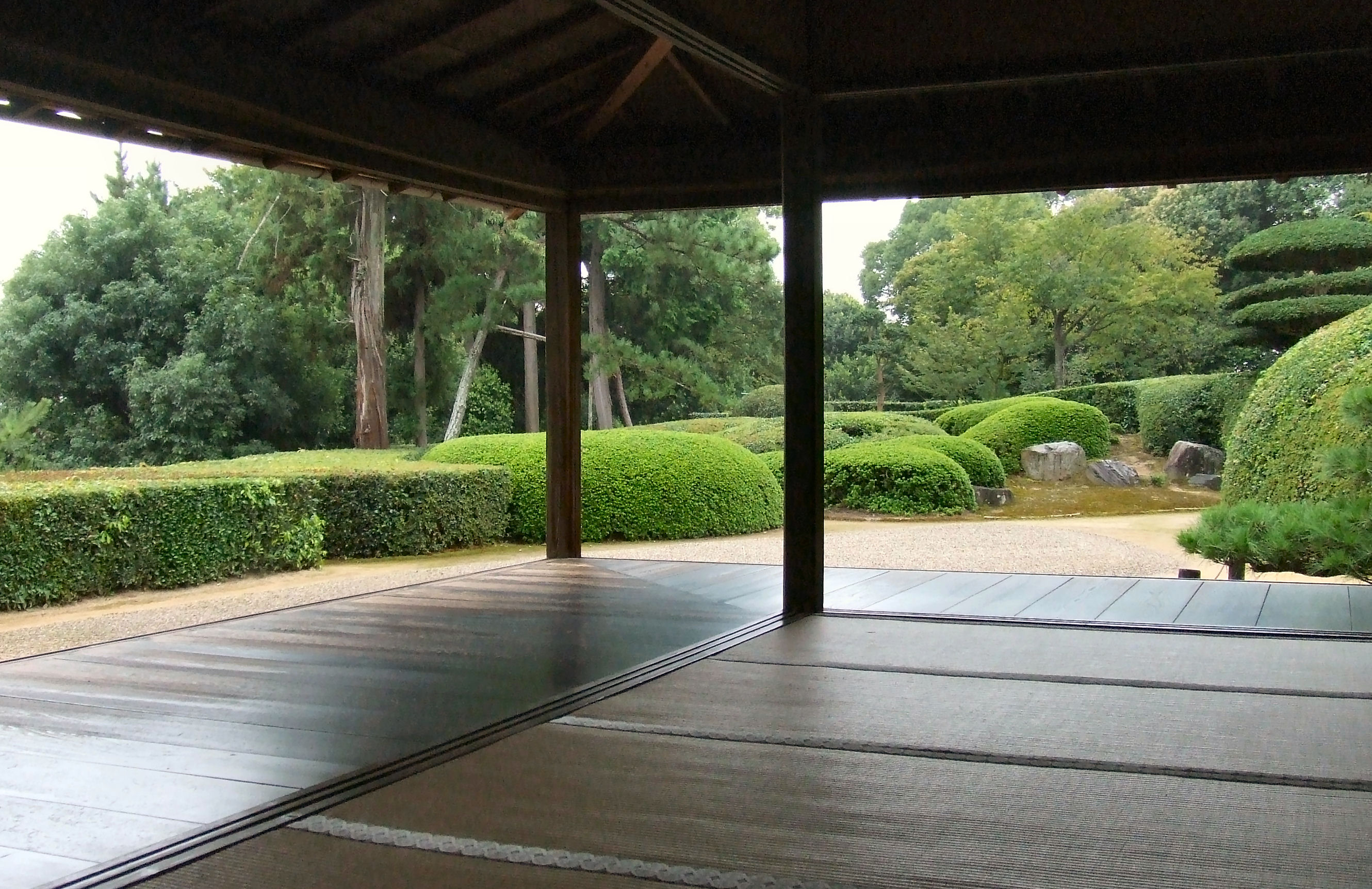
From Shoin towards Gardens

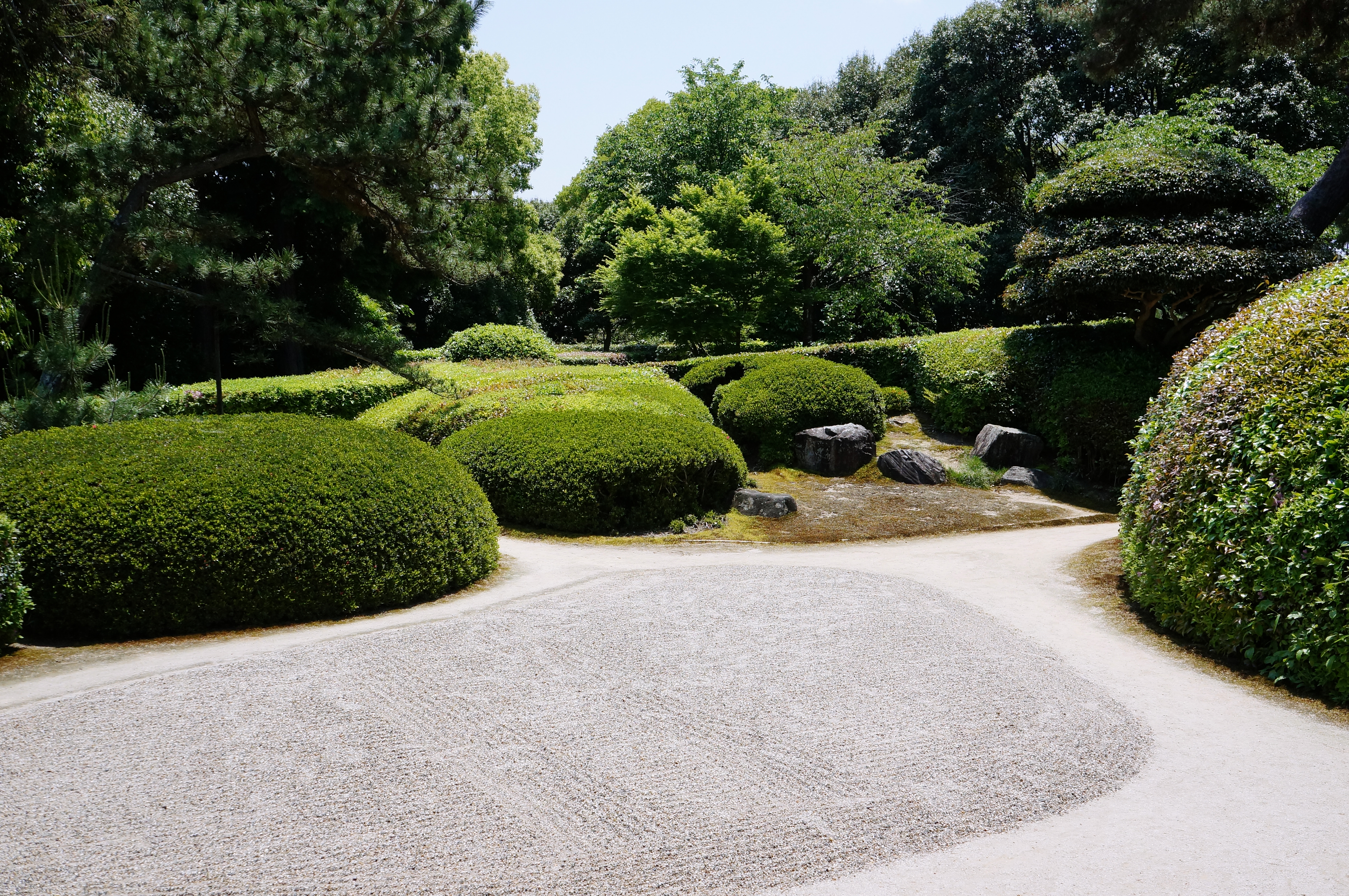
Gardens

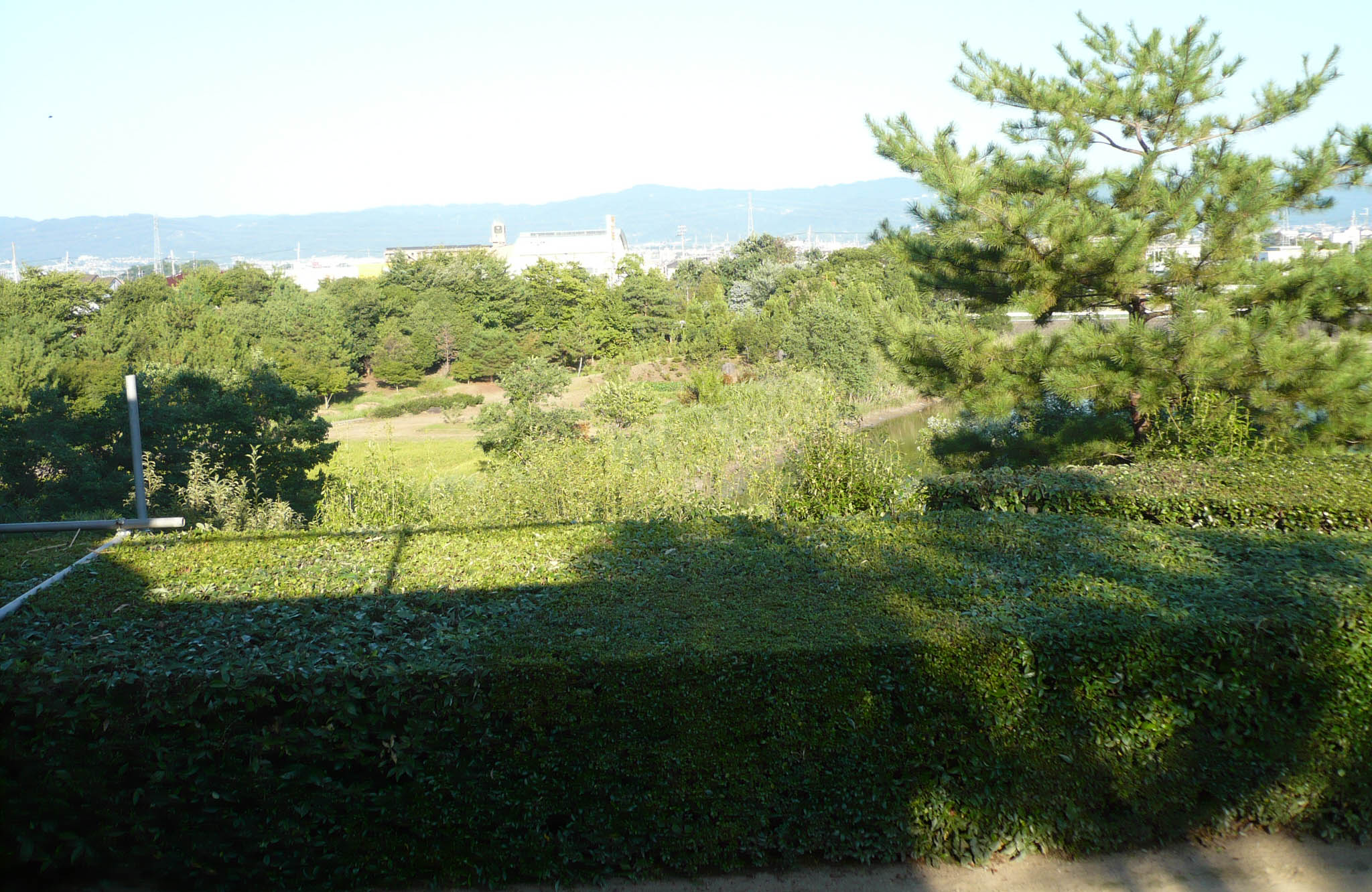
Borrowed Scenery

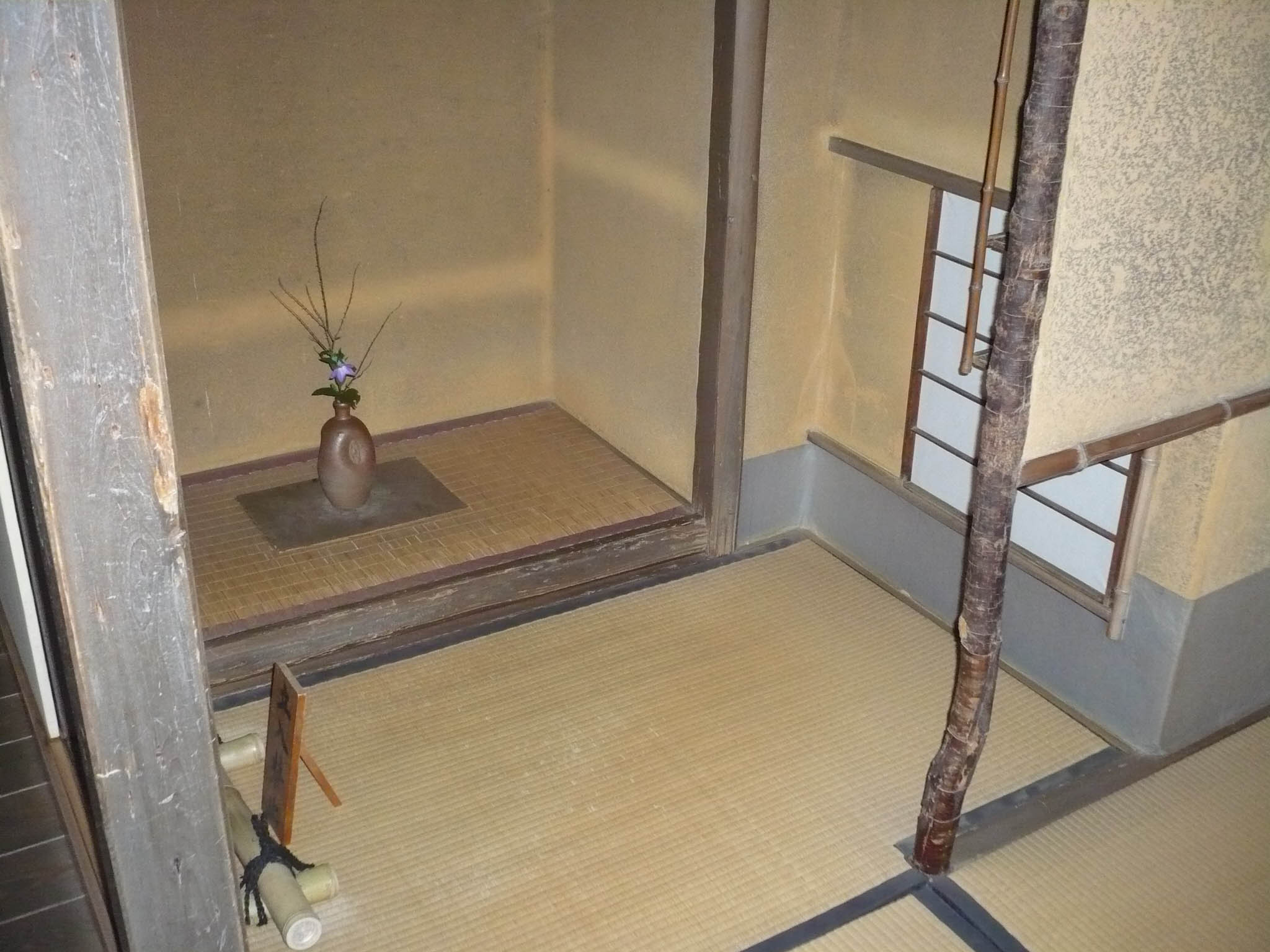
Kobayashi Chashitsu

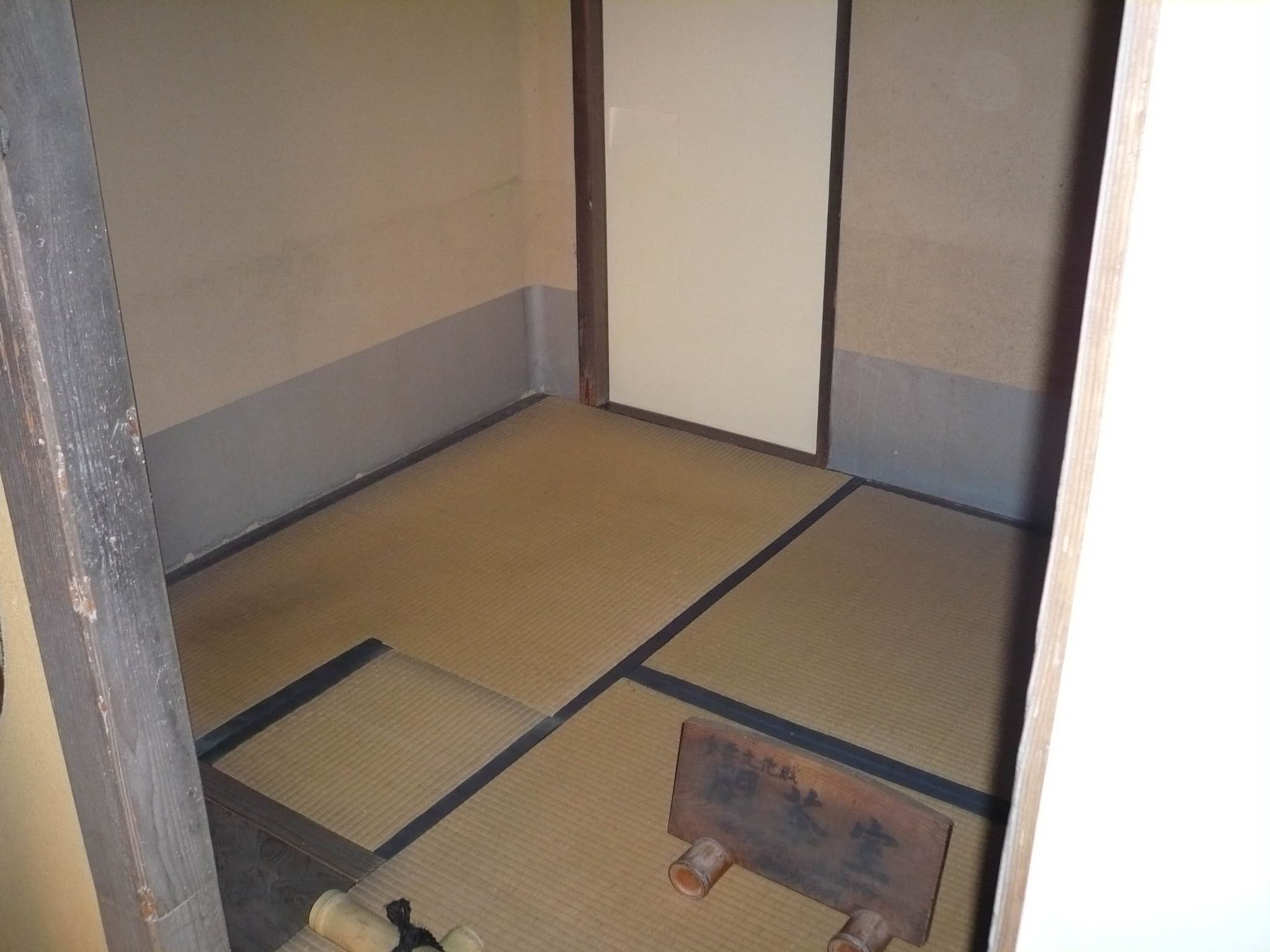
Chashitsu (3 mat)

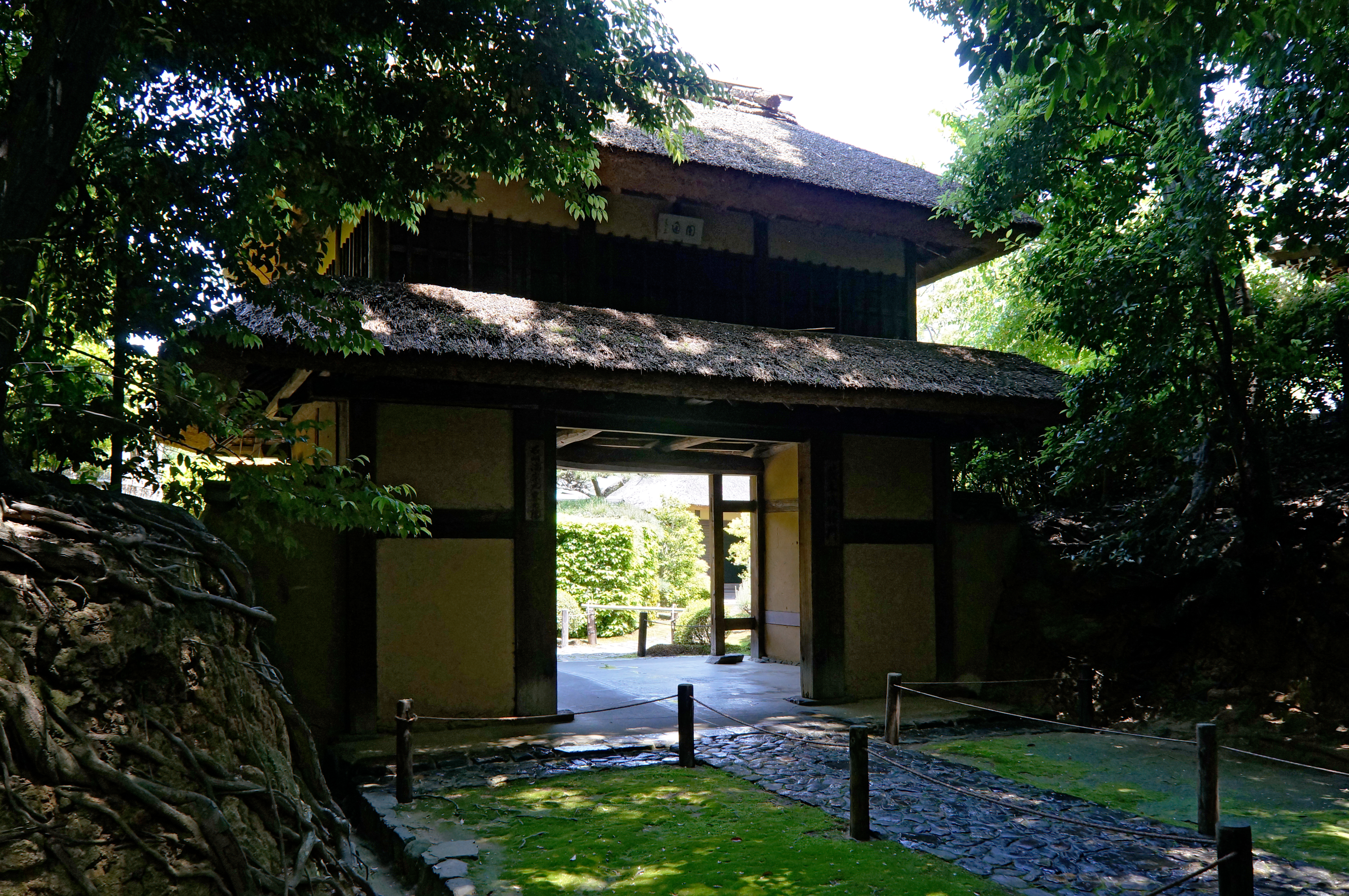
Ibaraki Gate

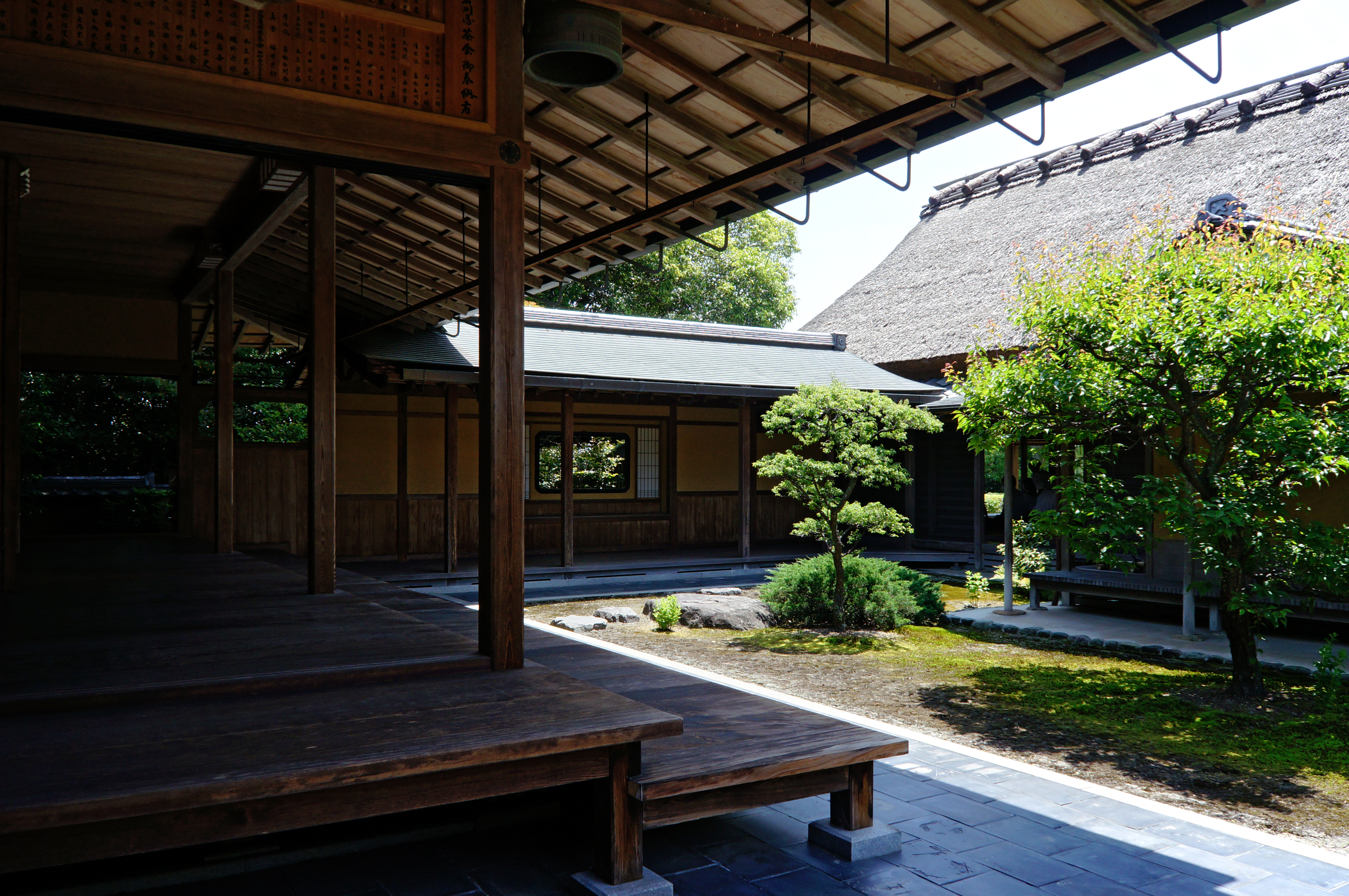
Middle Garden

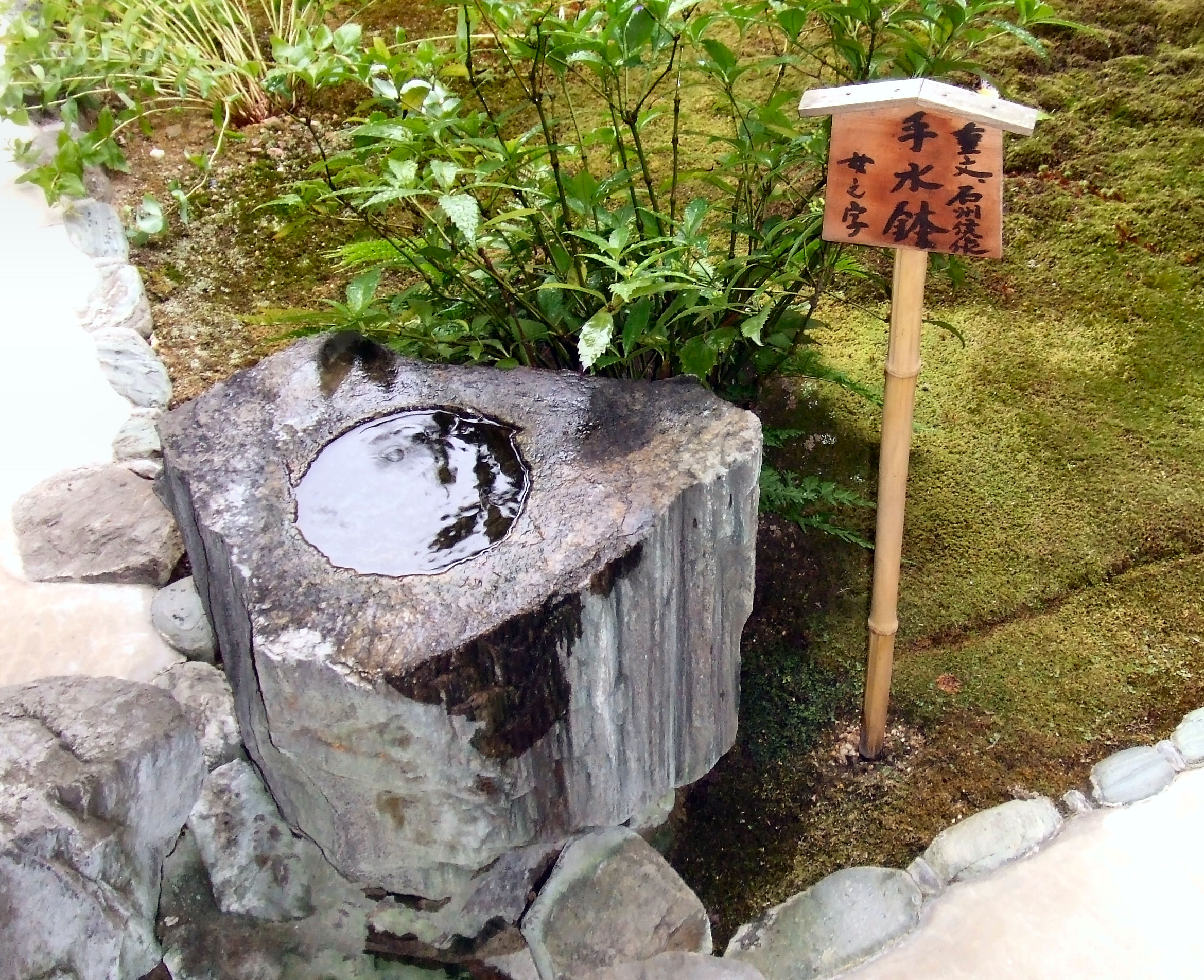
Chōzubachi

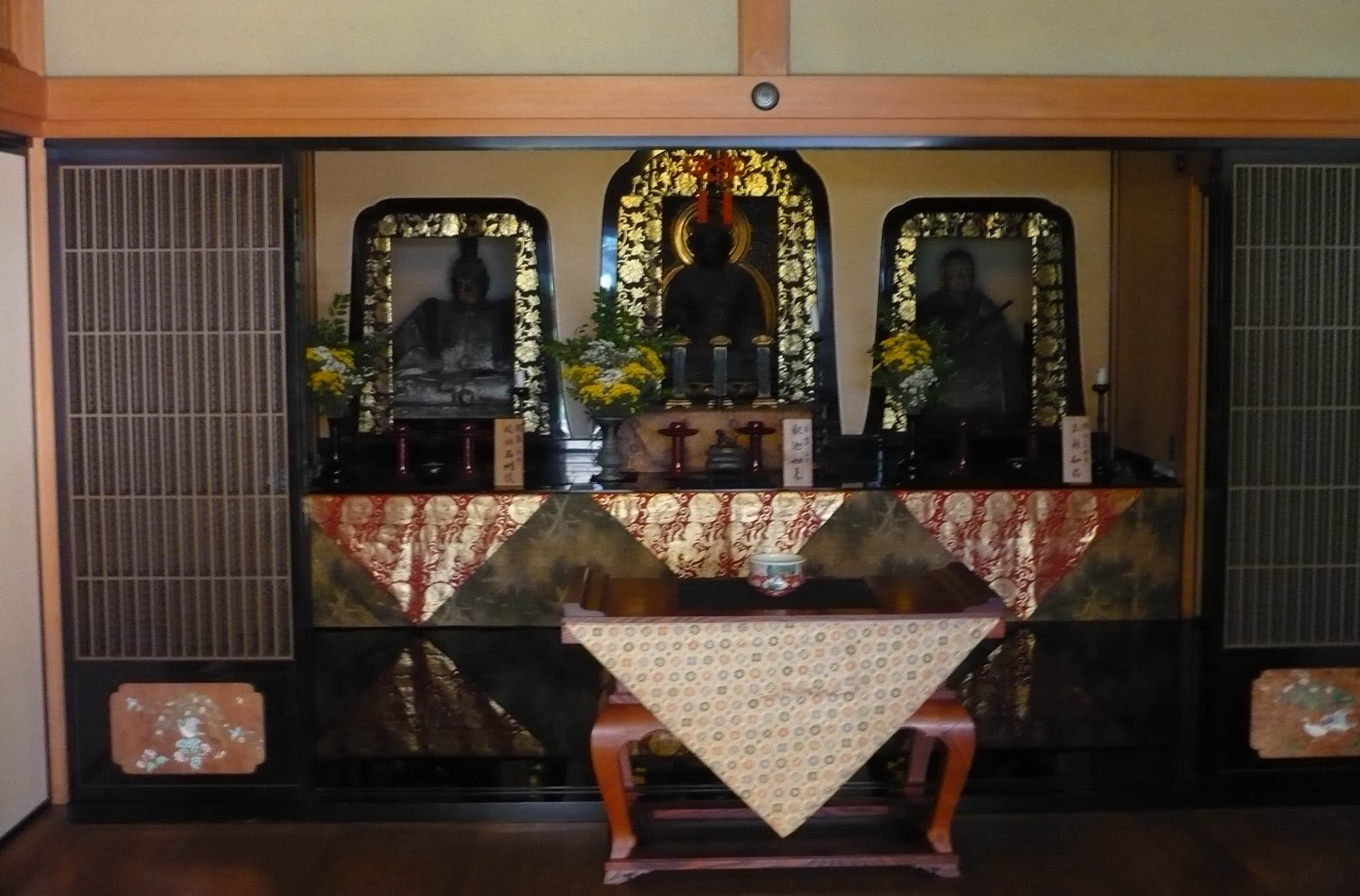
Inside the temple

== National Important Cultural Properties ==
- Shoin (書院), early Edo period. This is the central building of the temple and functions as its Main Hall. It has the appearance of a farmhouse with a thatch roof, hipped gables and tiled eaves. It consists of an upper room of 13 tatami mats, a middle room, and a lower room. The upper room is equipped with a tokonoma but it does not have a nageshi (railings), making it a simple and light design. On the north side is a three tatami mat room for the tea ceremony. The ceiling and lintels are low throughout, carefully designed to give a sense of peace and calm when seated. It is also famous for its borrowed scenery view of the Nara Basin. It was designed a National Important Cultural Property in 1944. The tsukubai (water basin) attached to the tea room and the three chōzubachi (water basins) attached to the Shoin were also made by Sekishu, and all part of the National Important Cultural Property designation.
- Chashitsu Kobayashi-an (茶室(高林庵)), early Edo period. This is the chashitsu used by Katagiri Sadamasa. In 1671, it was added to the northeast of the shoin (abbot's chamber). The interior is a two-tatami-mat daime (a platform) with a large lattice window on a rectangular fold, and the nijiriguchi (a small entrance to the room) is left open to the right, leaving a small wall behind. The tokonoma alcove is placed immediately to the left of the tea ceremony entrance, the furthest from the guest seat, showing the layout of a "host's alcove." Including the two-tatami waiting room separated from the guest room by two sliding doors, the entire room is four tatami mats in size, which is the same as the four tatami mat layout that Sekishu had originally built in his Kyoto mansion. The toko-bashira central pillar (with oak bark still attached) has a unique curve, which is said to have been particularly to Sekishu's liking. It was designed a National Important Cultural Property in 1944.

== See also ==
- List of Historic Sites of Japan (Nara)
- List of Places of Scenic Beauty of Japan (Nara)
