= List of places of scenic beauty of Japan (Nara) =

This list is of the places of scenic beauty of Japan located within the Prefecture of Nara.

== National Places of Scenic Beauty ==
As of 1 January 2025, fourteen Places have been designated at a national level (including three *Special Places of Scenic Beauty); Dorohatchō spans the prefectural borders with Wakayama and Mie.

Site	Municipality	Comments	Image	Coordinates	Type	Ref.
*Heijō Palace Tōin Gardens 平城宮東院庭園; Heijō-kyū tōin teien	Nara	the palace is inscribed on the UNESCO World Heritage List as one of the Historic Monuments of Ancient Nara		34°41′22″N 135°48′08″E	1	
*Sakyō Sanjō Nibō Palace Site Gardens 平城京左京三条二坊宮跡庭園; Heijō-kyō sakyō sanjō nibō miya ato teien	Nara	also a Special Historic Site		34°41′02″N 135°48′08″E	1	
*Dorohatchō 瀞八丁; Dorohatchō	Totsukawa	the designation includes an area of Shingū in Wakayama Prefecture and Kumano in Mie Prefecture; also a Natural Monument		33°54′29″N 135°51′46″E	5	
Isui-en 依水園; Isui-en	Nara			34°41′09″N 135°50′16″E	1	
Enjō-ji Gardens 円成寺庭園; Enjōji teien	Nara			34°41′45″N 135°54′56″E	1	
Mount Yoshino 吉野山; Yoshino-yama	Yoshino	also an Historic Site; inscribed on the UNESCO World Heritage List as one of the Sacred Sites and Pilgrimage Routes in the Kii Mountain Range		34°21′23″N 135°52′14″E	3	
Former Daijō-in Gardens 旧大乗院庭園; Kyū-Daijōin teien	Nara			34°40′40″N 135°50′04″E	1	
Tsukigase Plum Groves 月瀬梅林; Tsukigase bairin	Nara	in Tsukigase-Kōnoyama Prefectural Natural Park		34°42′27″N 136°01′24″E	3	
Jikō-in Gardens 慈光院庭園; Jikōin Gardens	Yamatokōriyama	also an Historic Site		34°37′54″N 135°45′29″E	1	
Yamato Sanzan 大和三山; Yamato sanzan	Kashihara			34°30′54″N 135°48′20″E	3, 10, 11	
Taima-dera Nakanobō Gardens 当麻寺中之坊庭園; Taimadera nakanobō teien	Katsuragi	also an Historic Site		34°30′56″N 135°41′43″E	1	
Nara Park 奈良公園; Nara kōen	Nara			34°41′11″N 135°51′12″E	1	
Asuka Capital Site Pond 飛鳥京跡苑池; Asuka-kyō ato enchi	Asuka	also an Historic Site; submitted for future inscription on the UNESCO World Heritage List as part of the serial nomination Asuka-Fujiwara: Archaeological sites of Japan’s Ancient Capitals and Related Properties		34°28′30″N 135°49′07″E	1	
Hokke-ji Gardens 法華寺庭園; Hokkeji teien	Nara			34°41′32″N 135°48′14″E	1	

== Prefectural Places of Scenic Beauty ==
As of 1 May 2024, five Places have been designated at a prefectural level.

Site	Municipality	Comments	Image	Coordinates	Type	Ref.
Morimura Family Gardens 森村家庭園; Morimura-ke teien	Kashihara			34°31′09″N 135°47′57″E		
Mount Kōno 神野山; Kōno-yama	Yamazoe	in Tsukigase-Kōnoyama Prefectural Natural Park; also a Prefectural Natural Monument		34°40′04″N 135°59′46″E		
Ōkura Jinja Gardens 大蔵神社庭園; Ōkura Jinja teien	Yoshino			34°22′22″N 135°56′02″E		
Gangyō-ji Gardens 願行寺庭園; Gangyōji teien	Shimoichi			34°22′12″N 135°47′16″E		
Kasuga Taisha Kihinkan Gardens 春日大社貴賓館庭園; Kasuga Taisha Kihinkan teien	Nara			34°40′54″N 135°50′50″E		

== Municipal Places of Scenic Beauty ==
As of 1 May 2024, five Places have been designated at a municipal level.

Site	Municipality	Comments	Image	Coordinates	Type	Ref.
Iwaya-Masugata 岩屋桝型 iwaya-masugata	Yamazoe			34°41′42″N 135°59′10″E		
Chōkyū-ji - Chiryū Park 長久寺・智龍公園; Chōkyūji・Chiryū kōen	Yamazoe			34°37′42″N 136°02′27″E		
Kōno-ji Precinct and Temple Grounds 神野寺境内及び寺領地; Kōnoji keidai oyobi tera ryōchi	Yamazoe	in Tsukigase-Kōnoyama Prefectural Natural Park		34°39′55″N 135°59′52″E		

== Registered Places of Scenic Beauty ==
As of 27 January 2025, one Monument has been registered (as opposed to designated) as a Place of Scenic Beauty at a national level.

Place	Municipality	Comments	Image	Coordinates	Type	Ref.
Mount Myōjin (Mount Hirume) 明神山(送迎山); Myōjin-yama (Hirume-yama)	Ōji			34°34′25″N 135°40′32″E		

== See also ==
- Cultural Properties of Japan
- List of Historic Sites of Japan (Nara)
- List of parks and gardens of Nara Prefecture
