= Katagiri Takatoshi =

- 片桐 孝利
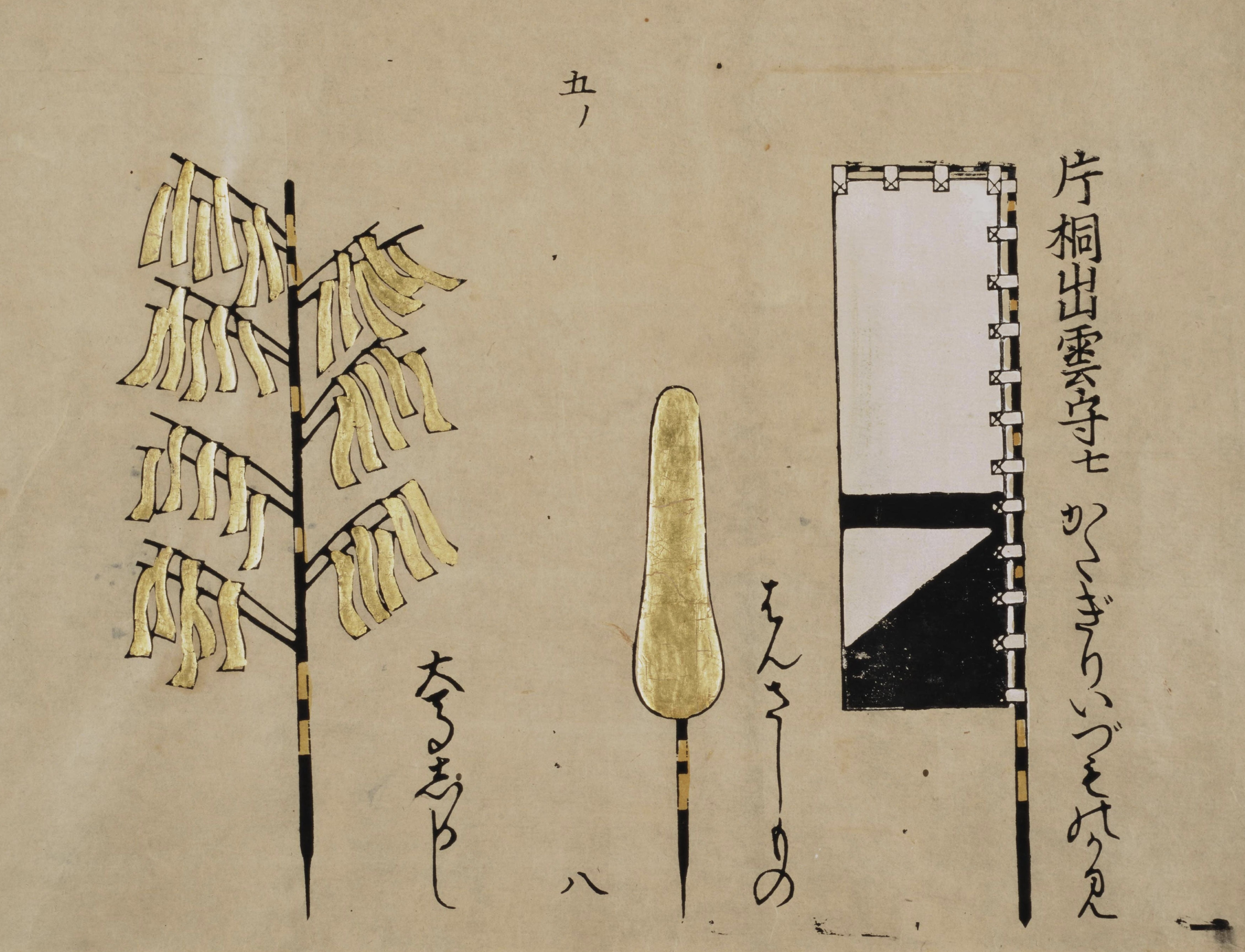
- Katagiri Takatoshi's Uma-jirushi

Daimyō of Tatsuta Domain
- In office 1615–1638
- Preceded by: Katagiri Katsumoto
- Succeeded by: Katagiri Tamemoto

Personal details
- Born: 1601
- Died: 1638 (aged 36–37)
- Children: Katagiri Tamemoto (adopted)
- Parent: Katagiri Katsumoto (father)
- Relatives: Katagiri Tamemoto (brother)

Military service
- Allegiance: Toyotomi clan Tokugawa clan
- Rank: Daimyō
- Unit: Katagiri clan

Katagiri Takatoshi (片桐 孝利; 1601 – 1638) was a Japanese daimyō of the early Edo period. He was the eldest son of Katagiri Katsumoto. In 1615, he became the second head of the Katagiri clan and lord of the Tatsuta Domain in Yamato Province. He died in 1638 at the age of 38. His childhood name was Motokane, and his common name was Jirosuke.
