= Katagiri Tamemoto =

- 片桐 為元
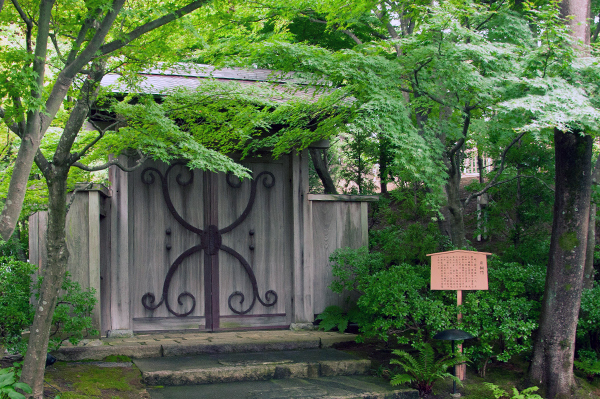
- Katagiri gate in the MOA Museum of Art

Daimyō of Tatsuta Domain
- In office 1638–1654
- Preceded by: Katagiri Takatoshi
- Succeeded by: Katagiri Tametsugu

Personal details
- Born: 1611
- Died: 1654 (aged 42–43)
- Children: Katagiri Tametsugu
- Parent(s): Katagiri Katsumoto; Katagiri Takatoshi (adoptive)
- Relatives: Katagiri Takatoshi (brother)

Military service
- Allegiance: Tokugawa clan
- Rank: Daimyō
- Unit: Katagiri clan

Katagiri Tamemoto (片桐 為元; 1611 – 1654) was a Japanese daimyō of the early Edo period. Born in 1611, he was the fourth son of Katagiri Katsumoto. He was adopted by his elder brother Katagiri Takatoshi and in 1638 became the third head of the Katagiri clan and lord of the Tatsuta Domain in Yamato Province. He died in 1654 at the age of 44.
