= Katagiri Sadataka =

- 片桐 貞隆

Daimyō of Koizumi Domain
- Succeeded by: Katagiri Sekishū

Personal details
- Born: 3 July 1560
- Died: 1627 (aged 66–67)
- Children: Katagiri Sekishū
- Parent: Katagiri Naosada (father)
- Relatives: Katagiri Katsumoto (brother)

Military service
- Allegiance: Toyotomi clan
- Rank: Daimyō
- Unit: Katagiri clan
- Battles/wars: Siege of Osaka

Katagiri Sadakata (片桐 貞隆; 1560 – 1627) was a Japanese daimyō of the early Edo period. Born on 3 July 1560, in Ōmi Province, he served Toyotomi Hideyoshi alongside his elder brother, Katagiri Katsumoto, and later Toyotomi Hideyori after Hideyoshi's death.

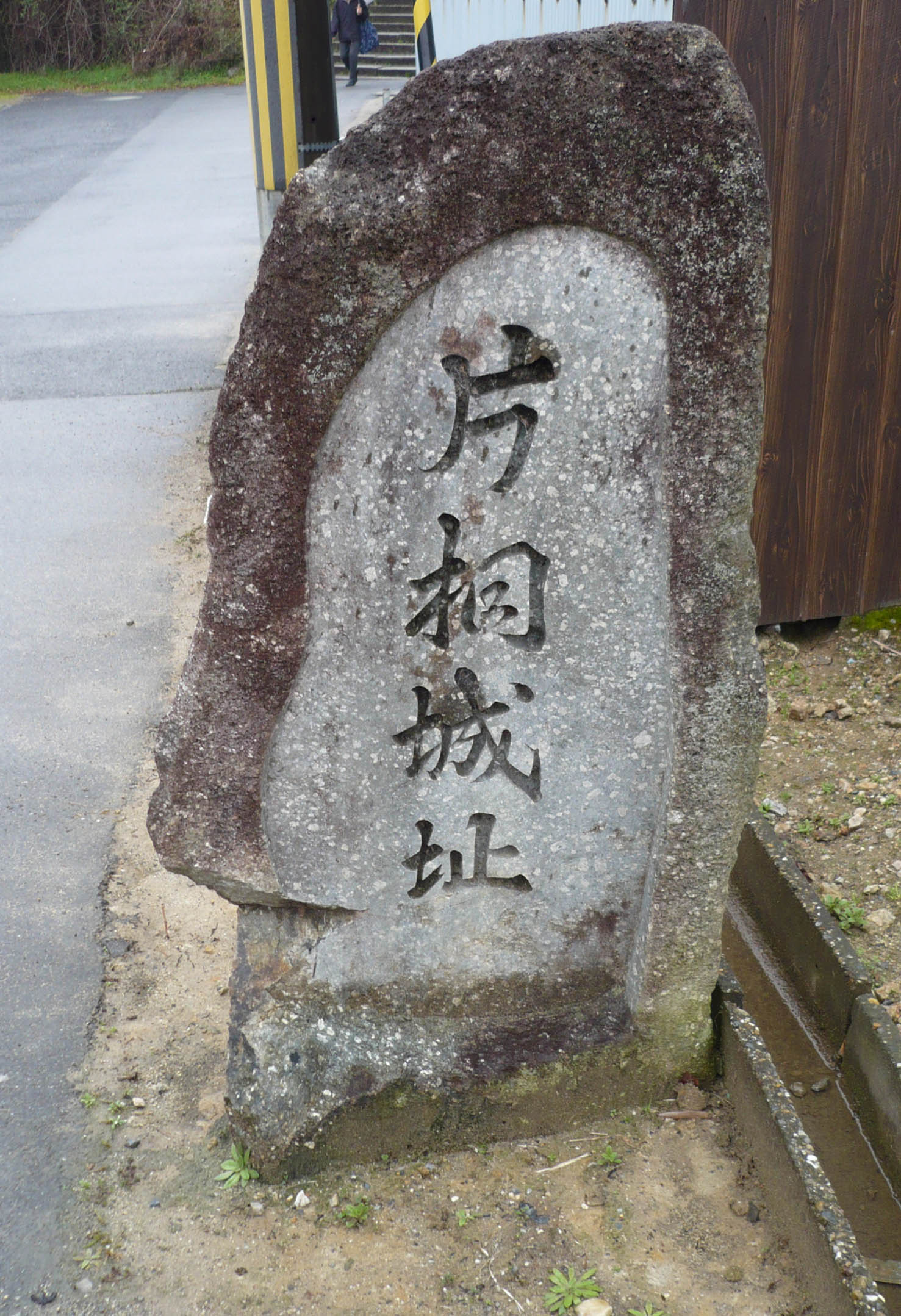
Stone monument of Koizumi Castle

In 1601, he became the first head of the Katagiri clan and lord of the Koizumi Domain in Yamato Province. Initially holding a stipend of 10,000 koku, it was later increased to 16,400 koku in 1615. After the Siege of Osaka, he received the lands of Nishi-Namba, Tsukaguchi Yashikikata, Higashi-Tomatsu, Nishi-Koyo, Tsuneyoshi, Tokitomo and Nishi-Tomatsu. He died in 1627 at the age of 68. His common name was Kabei.
