= Katagiri Tametsugu =

- 片桐 為次
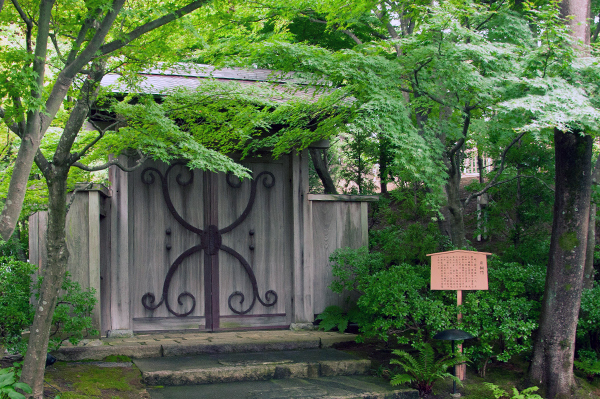
- Katagiri gate in the MOA Museum of Art

Daimyō of Tatsuta Domain
- In office 1654–1655
- Preceded by: Katagiri Tamemoto
- Succeeded by: Abolished

Personal details
- Born: 1641
- Died: 1655 (aged 15)
- Parent: Katagiri Tamemoto (father)
- Relatives: Katagiri Katsuteru (brother)

Military service
- Allegiance: Tokugawa clan
- Rank: Daimyō
- Unit: Katagiri clan

Katagiri Tametsugu (片桐 為次; 1641 – 1655) was a Japanese daimyō of the early Edo period. Born in 1641, he was the eldest son of Katagiri Tamemoto. In 1654 he succeeded his father as the fourth head of the Katagiri clan and lord of the Tatsuta Domain in Yamato Province. He died in 1655 at the age of 15. Having left no heir, the domain was abolished, however, his younger brother Katsuteru continued the family line as a hatamoto.
