= Katagiri Sekishū =

17th-century Japanese daimyō, monk, and painter

- 片桐 貞昌

Daimyō of Koizumi Domain
- Preceded by: Katagiri Sadataka
- Succeeded by: Katagiri Sadafusa

Personal details
- Born: 1605 Ibaraki, Settsu, Japan
- Died: 1673 (aged 67–68)
- Parent: Katagiri Sadataka (father)
- Other work: Sekishū sambyakkajō (Sekishū's Three Hundred Articles)
- Nickname(s): Katagiri Sadamasa; Katagiri Iwami-no-kami Sadaaki

Military service
- Allegiance: Tokugawa shogunate
- Rank: Daimyō
- Unit: Katagiri clan

Katagiri Sekishū (片桐 貞昌; 1605 – 1673), also known as Katagiri Sadamasa or Katagiri Iwami-no-kami Sadaaki, was a Japanese daimyō, tea master, Buddhist monk and painter of the early Edo period. He was the son of Katagiri Sadataka and held the fief of Koizumi in Izumi Province with an income of 10,000 koku. A pupil of Kuwayama Sōsen, he was the founder of the Sekishu-ryu school and was known for his taste, judgment, and deep knowledge of tea philosophy. He was appointed tea master to Tokugawa Ietsuna.
