= Yamato-Koizumi Station =

Railway station in Yamatokōriyama, Nara Prefecture, Japan

Yamato-Koizumi Station 大和小泉駅
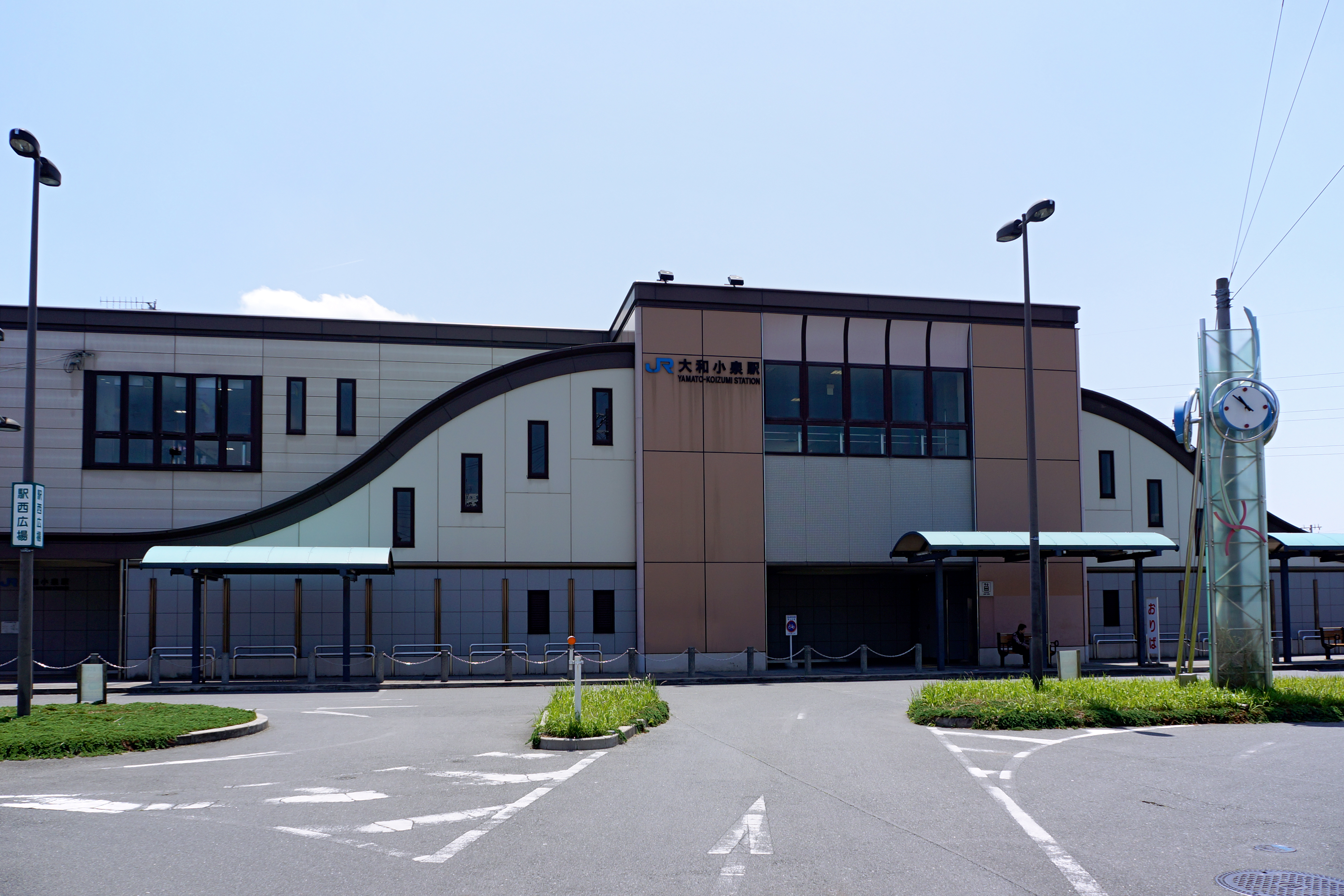
- Yamato-Koizumi Station, May 2013

General information
- Location: 492-3, Koizumicho, Yamatokoriyama-shi, Nara-ken 639-1042; Japan
- Coordinates: 34°37′21″N 135°45′49″E
- Operator: JR West
- Line: Q Yamatoji Line
- Distance: 21.6 km from Kamo
- Platforms: 2 side platforms
- Connections: Bus stop

Construction
- Structure type: elevated
- Accessible: yes

Other information
- Station code: JR-Q33
- Website: Official website

History
- Opened: 25 August 1920; 106 years ago

Passengers
- FY2020: 6312 daily

Services
Preceding station	JR West	Following station
Kōriyama towards JR Namba	Yamatoji Line Local Rapid	Hōryūji towards Kamo
Location
- Location within Nara Prefecture Location within Kansai region Location within Japan

Yamato-Koizumi Station (大和小泉駅, Yamato-Koizumi-eki) is a passenger railway station located in the city of Yamatokōriyama, Nara, Japan. It is operated by West Japan Railway Company (JR West) and is administrated by Ōji Station.

== Lines ==
The station is served by the Kansai Main Line (Yamatoji Line) and is 21.6 kilometers from the starting point of the line at Kamo and 142.5 kilometers from Nagoya.

== Layout ==
Yamato-Koizumi Station is an above-ground station with two side platforms, connected by an elevated station building. The station has a Midori no Madoguchi staffed ticket office.

=== Platforms ===
1	■ Yamatoji Line	for Nara and Kamo
2	■ Yamatoji Line	for Oji, Tennoji, JR Namba and Osaka

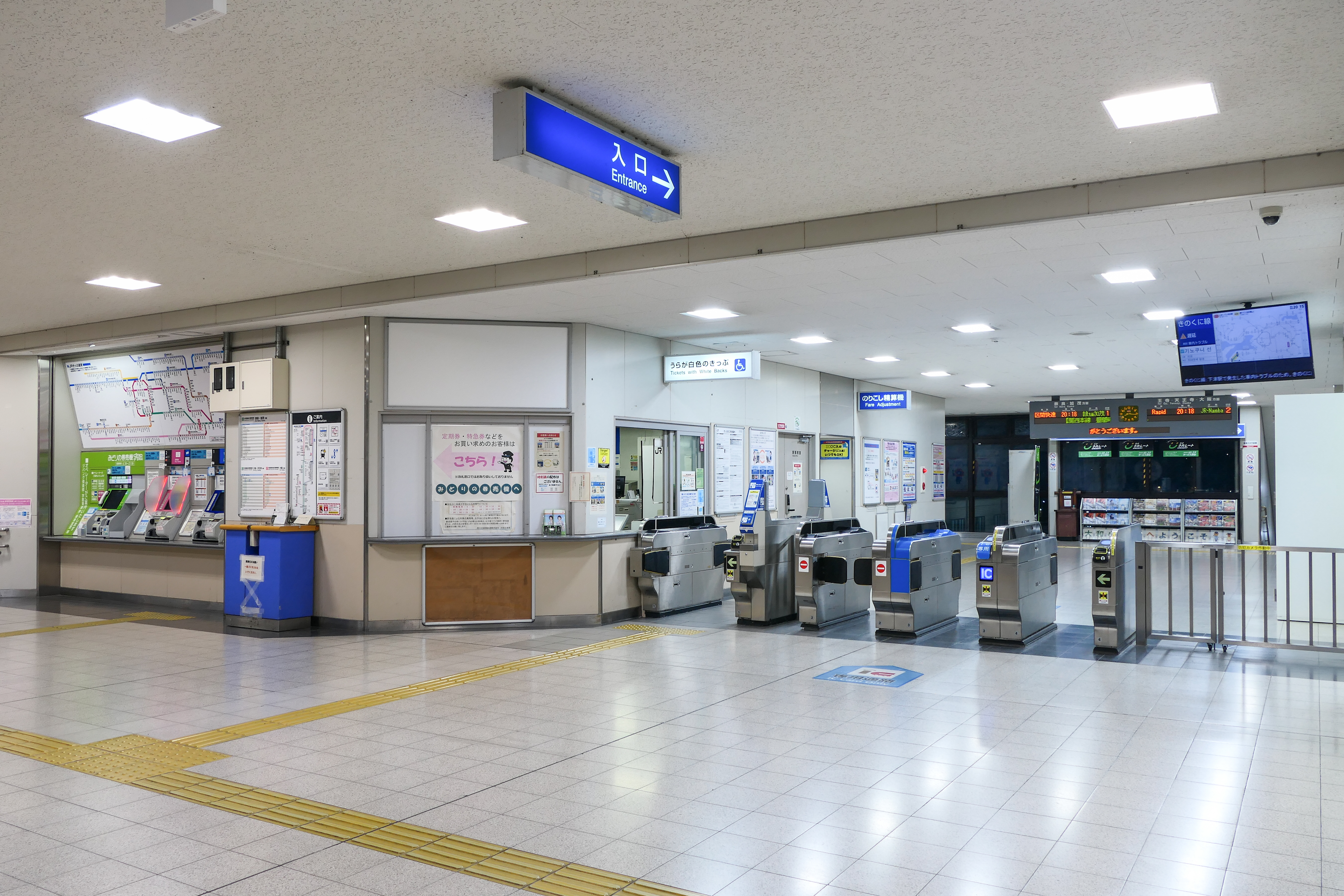
Ticket gate

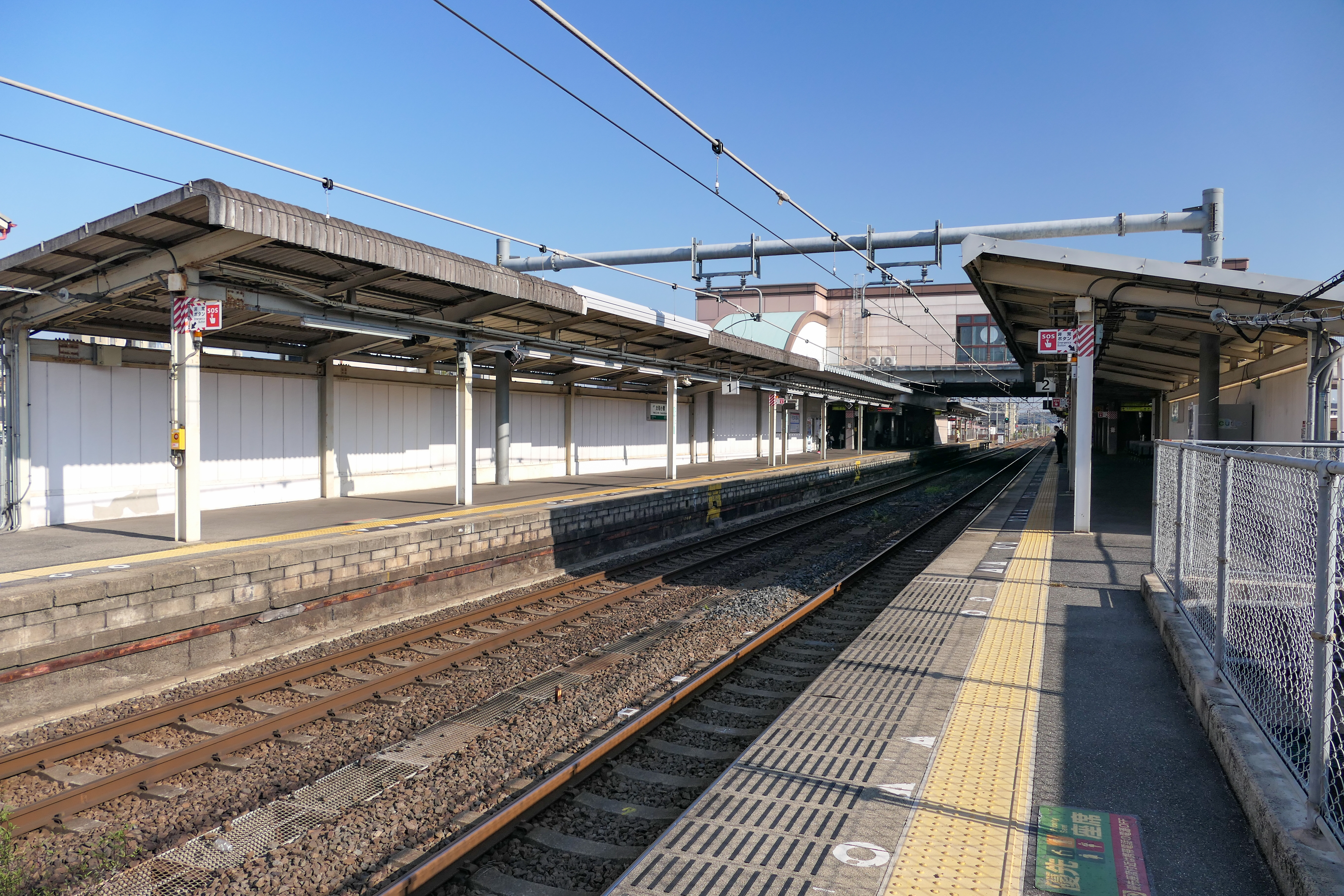
Platforms

== History ==
The station was opened on August 25, 1920. With the privatization of the Japan National Railways (JNR) on April 1, 1987, the station came under the control of West Japan Railway Company (JR West). Station numbering was introduced in March 2018 with Yamato-Koizumi being assigned station number JR-Q33.

== Passenger statistics ==
The average daily passenger traffic in fiscal 2020 was 6312 passengers.

== Surrounding area ==
- Japan National Route 25
- Jikō-in

== See also ==
- List of railway stations in Japan
