= Tsukigase-Kōnoyama Prefectural Natural Park =

Natural park of Nara prefecture, Japan

- 県立月ヶ瀬神野山自然公園
- Interactive map of Tsukigase-Kōnoyama Prefectural Natural Park
- Location: Nara Prefecture, Japan
- Area: 5.07 km^{2} (1.96 sq mi)
- Established: 1 July 1975

Tsukigase-Kōnoyama Prefectural Natural Park (県立月ヶ瀬神野山自然公園, Kenritsu Tsukigase-Kōnoyama shizen kōen) is a Prefectural Natural Park in northeast Nara Prefecture, Japan. Established in 1975, the park comprises two non-contiguous areas spanning the borders of the municipalities of Nara and Yamazoe. The plum groves of Tsukigase were designated a Place of Scenic Beauty in 1922. Although a dam constructed in 1964 submerged 3,950 plum trees, subsequent replanting has increased the numbers to 10,000. The area is also celebrated for its azaleas, as is Mount Kōno, which rises to a height of 618.8m.

== See also ==
- National Parks of Japan
- Monuments of Japan
