= Katagiri Katsumoto =

Japanese warlord (daimyō)

- 片桐 且元

Karō of Toyotomi clan
- In office 1598–1614
- Succeeded by: Ōno Harunaga

Daimyō of Ibaraki
- In office 1600–1615

Daimyō of Tatsuta Domain
- In office 1601–1615
- Succeeded by: Katagiri Takatoshi

Personal details
- Born: 1556
- Died: June 24, 1615 (aged 58–59)
- Children: Katagiri Takatoshi; Katagiri Tamemoto
- Parent: Katagiri Naosada (father)
- Relatives: Katagiri Sadataka (brother)

Military service
- Allegiance: Toyotomi clan Tokugawa shogunate
- Rank: Daimyō
- Unit: Katagiri clan
- Commands: Ibaraki area
- Battles/wars: Battle of Shizugatake

Katagiri Katsumoto (片桐 且元; 1556 – June 24, 1615) was a Japanese warlord (daimyō) of Ibaraki, in the Azuchi–Momoyama period through early Edo period. In his youth he was famed as one of the Seven Spears of Shizugatake, during the Battle of Shizugatake in May 1583.

== Biography ==
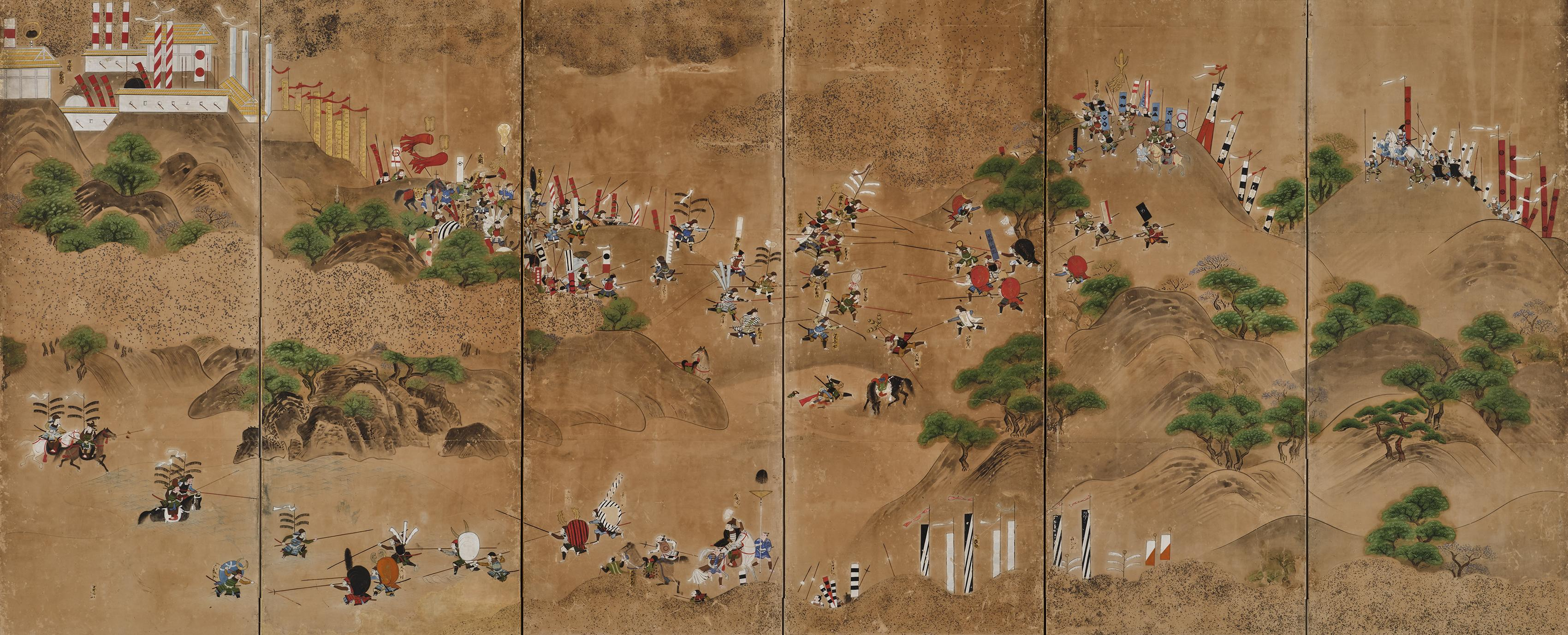
Byōbu of the Battle of Shizugatake, with Katagiri Katsumoto depicted

Katsumoto hailed from an ancient samurai clan with a long and distinguished history. In the early Heian period, the Katagiri clan served the Minamoto family, the traditional head of the samurai that supplied early shōguns and their government, and ruled the southernmost part of Shinano region for nearly 500 years.

Despite his lineage and the promising start at the Battle of Shizugatake, Katsumoto's rise under Toyotomi Hideyoshi was relatively slow compared to his fellow "seven spears", which included Katō Kiyomasa and Fukushima Masanori. Katsumoto was more of a court samurai than a warrior; Katsumoto was kept in the Osaka region, the de facto capital of Japan under the Toyotomi family, and his holdings were in Ibaraki area in the north. (Marked today by a small bronze statue).

Following Hideyoshi's death in 1598, Katsumoto was appointed the chamberlain of the Toyotomi household. After the Battle of Sekigahara in 1600, he was with Toyotomi Hideyori, the only son and heir of Hideyoshi, Katsumoto sought to negotiate a compromise with Ieyasu. The Toyotomi clan lost most of its territory which was under management of a 'western daimyō', and Hideyori was degraded to an ordinary daimyō, not a ruler of Japan.

However in 1614, Yodo-dono, mother of young Hideyori, was hopelessly out of touch with the new Tokugawa ruler. Yodo-dono grew increasingly suspicious of Katsumoto's loyalty, and finally banished Katsumoto from Osaka Castle, which directly resulted in the Siege of Osaka by Ieyasu's 200,000-strong army. The following summer, in 1615, the Toyotomi family was annihilated, Yodo-dono and Hideyori committed suicide within the burning castle.

== Death ==
Katsumoto's precise role in all of this saga is unclear. Katsumoto died only 20 days after the fall of the Osaka Castle for unknown reasons, though the rumor of seppuku was rife. Although his own lineage died out later in the 17th century, Katsumoto's younger brother and his family maintained Katagiri's name and its standing as a daimyō. The descendants of which were ennobled in 1884 and retained the title of Viscounts until 1946 when the system was abolished.

== Cultural references ==
Katsumoto's anguish after the fall of the Toyotomi clan was later dramatised in kabuki theatre where Katsumoto cut a tragic figure in Hamlet's mould. In Tsubouchi Shōyō's play Kiri-hitoha, which describes the fall of the house of Toyotomi, Katsumoto, the main character, is a faithful servant with good intentions and keen sense of reality but rendered powerless caught in the whirlwind of dynastic struggle. At the climax of the play, Katsumoto famously deplores that the fate finally caught up with the house of Toyotomi. The play, which may well be the best modern kabuki piece written by arguably the best playwright of modern Japan (published 1894–95, first staged in 1904), made "Katagiri Katsumoto" a household name and remains one of the best and most popular modern kabuki plays.

Preceded by none	First Daimyō of Ibaraki; 1600–1615	Succeeded by none
Preceded by none	First Daimyō of Tatsuta; 1601–1615	Succeeded by Katagiri Takatoshi
