= Koizumi Domain =

Administrative division in western Japan during the Edo period (1600-1871)

Koizumi Domain 小泉藩
- Domain of Japan
- 1600–1871
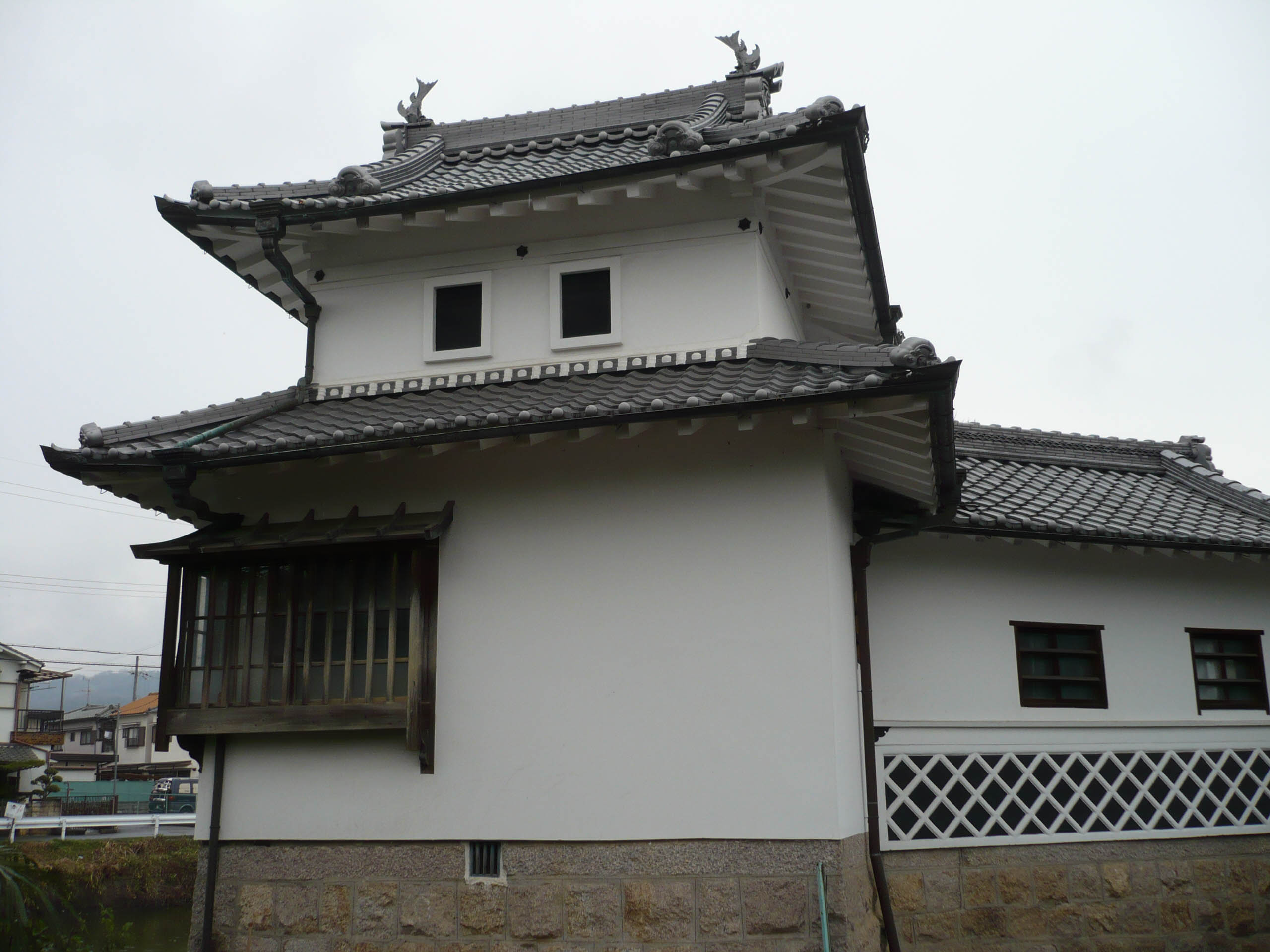
- reconstructed yagura of Koizumi Castle, later Koizumi jin'ya]

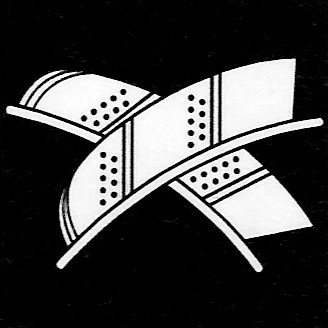
- Mon of the Katagiri clan
- Capital: Koizumi jin'ya
- Area
  - Coordinates: 34°47′38.41″N 135°26′55.01″E
- Historical era: Edo period
  - Established: 1600
  - Abolition of the han system: 1871
- Contained within
  - Province: Yamato Province
- Today part of: Nara Prefecture

Location of Koizumi jin'ya
Koizumi Domain (Japan)

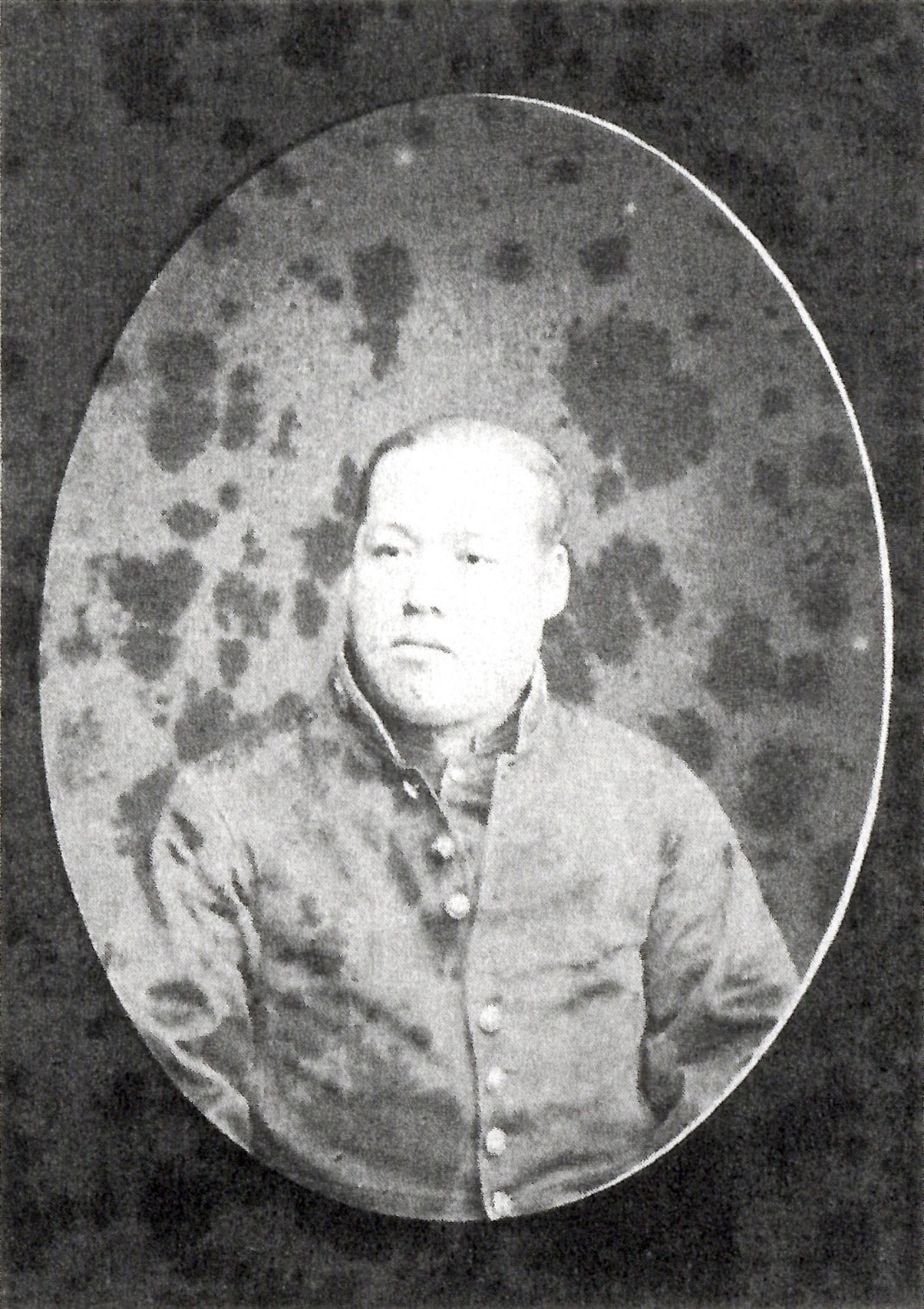
Katagiri Sadaatsu, final daimyo of Koizumi Domain

Koizumi Domain (小泉藩, Koizumi-han) was a feudal domain under the Tokugawa shogunate of Edo period Japan. It was centered around Koizumi jin'ya in what is now the city of Yamatokōriyama, Nara and was ruled by the tozama daimyō Katagiri clan for all of its history.

== History ==
Katagiri Sadataka, the younger brother of Katagiri Katsumoto (who was famous as one of the Seven Spears of Shizugatake) served Toyotomi Hideyoshi and achieved military exploits in the Battle of Odawara and the Japanese invasions of Korea (1592–1598), for which he was awarded with a fief of 10,000 koku in Harima Province. Sadataka supported the Toyotomi Hideyori after Hideyoshi's death, along with his older brother Katsumoto. Following the 1600 Battle of Sekigahara, he was transferred from Harima to a new 10,000 koku fief in Yamato Province. This marked the start of Koizumi Domain. In 1614, during the incident involving the inscription on a bell sponsored by Toyotomi Hideyori at the temple of Hōkō-ji in Kyoto (which Tokugawa Ieyasu was attempting to use as a casus belli against the Toyotomi clan), the Katagiri brothers were suspected by Hideyori of secretly communicating with Ieyasu. Sadataka withdrew from Osaka Castle with Katsumoto and moved to Ibaraki in Settsu Province. When evacuating from Osaka Castle, the 300 soldiers of the Katagiri clan were fully armed and made a spectacular move of lighting the matchlocks of their guns. The Toyotomi lost a critical component of its forces and were defeated in the Siege of Osaka that began in the same year. In return, Katagiri Sadataka became a vassal of Tokugawa Ieyasu and received an increase of 6,000 koku, bringing his kokudaka to 16,000 koku.

The second daimyō, Katagiri Sadamasa, was a well-known master of the Japanese tea ceremony under the name "Sekishu". In 1665, he became instructor to Shogun Tokugawa Ietsuna, and establish the Sekishu school of tea ceremony. He distributed 3,000 koku to his younger brother Katagiri Sadaharu to establish a cadet branch of the clan. The third daimyō, Katagiri Sadafusa, likewise granted 1000 koku to his illegitimate brother, Katagiri Nobutaka, followed by a second 1000 koku, bringing the total of the domain to 11,000 koku.

The fifth daimyō, Katagiri Sadanari, was reprimanded by the shogunate in 1749 for being unfilial for arbitrarily punishing Katagiri Nobuyoshi (a descendant of Nobutaka, the eldest illegitimate son of the second feudal lord Katagiri Sadamasa) and was suspended from service, but was pardoned after a month. The eighth daimyō, Katagiri Sadanobu, was a noted tea master under the name "Shunsai", and formed his own branch of the Sekishu-ryū school. In the Bakumatsu period, the main line of succession of the Katagiri line died out, and the 11th daimyō, Katagiri Sadatoshi, was adopted into the clan from Hitachi-Fuchū Domain. He distinguished himself by suppressing the Tenchu-gumi rebellion. In 1868, during the Boshin War, he sided with the new government and was responsible for the defense of Kyoto. He became imperial governor of Koizumi from 1869 to the abolition of the han system in 1871.

== Holdings at the end of the Edo period ==
As with most domains in the han system, Koizumi Domain consisted of several discontinuous territories calculated to provide the assigned kokudaka, based on periodic cadastral surveys and projected agricultural yields.

- Yamashiro Province
  - 1 village in Kuse District
  - 1 village in Sōraku District
- Yamato Province
  - 1 village in Soekami District
  - 8 villages in Soejima District
- Izumi Province
  - 1 village in Izumi District
- Settsu Province
  - 2 villages in Kawabe District

== List of daimyō ==
#	Name	Tenure	Courtesy title	Court Rank	kokudaka
Katagiri clan, 1600 - 1871(Tozama daimyo)
1	Katagiri Sadataka (片桐 貞隆)	1600 - 1627	Jūzen-no-kami (主膳正)	Junior 5th Rank, Lower Grade (従五位下)	16,000 koku
2	Katagiri Sadamasa (片桐貞昌)	1627 - 1673	Iwami-no-kami (石見守)	Junior 5th Rank, Lower Grade (従五位下)	16,000 -> 13,000 koku
3	Katagiri Sadafusa (片桐定房)	1674 - 1710	Jūzen-no-kami (主膳正)	Junior 5th Rank, Lower Grade (従五位下)	13,000 -> 12,000 ->11,000 koku
4	Katagiri Sadaoki (片桐貞起)	1710 - 1741	Iwami-no-kami (石見守)	Junior 5th Rank, Lower Grade (従五位下)	11,000 koku
5	Katagiri Sadanari (片桐貞音)	1741 - 1750	Jūzen-no-kami (主膳正)	Junior 5th Rank, Lower Grade (従五位下)	11,000 koku
6	Katagiri Sadayoshi (片桐貞芳)	1750 - 1787	Iwami-no-kami (石見守)	Junior 5th Rank, Lower Grade (従五位下)	11,000 koku
7	Katagiri Sadaaki (片桐貞彰)	1787 - 1822	Iwami-no-kami (石見守)	Junior 5th Rank, Lower Grade (従五位下)	11,000 koku
8	Katagiri Sadanobu (片桐貞信)	1822 - 1841	Iwami-no-kami (石見守)	Junior 5th Rank, Lower Grade (従五位下)	11,000 koku
9	Katagiri Sadanaka (片桐貞中)	1841 - 1843	Sado-no-kami (佐渡守)	Junior 5th Rank, Lower Grade (従五位下)	11,000 koku
10	Katagiri Sadateru (片桐貞照)	1843 - 1862	Iwami-no-kami (石見守)	Junior 5th Rank, Lower Grade (従五位下)	11,000 koku
11	Katagiri Sadatoshi (片桐貞利)	1862	-none-	Junior 5th Rank, Lower Grade (従五位下)	11,000 koku
12	Katagiri Sadaatsu (片桐貞篤)	1862 - 1871	-non-	Junior 5th Rank, Lower Grade (従五位下)	11,000 koku

== See also ==
- List of Han
- Abolition of the han system
