= Katagiri clan =

Katagiri clan 片桐氏
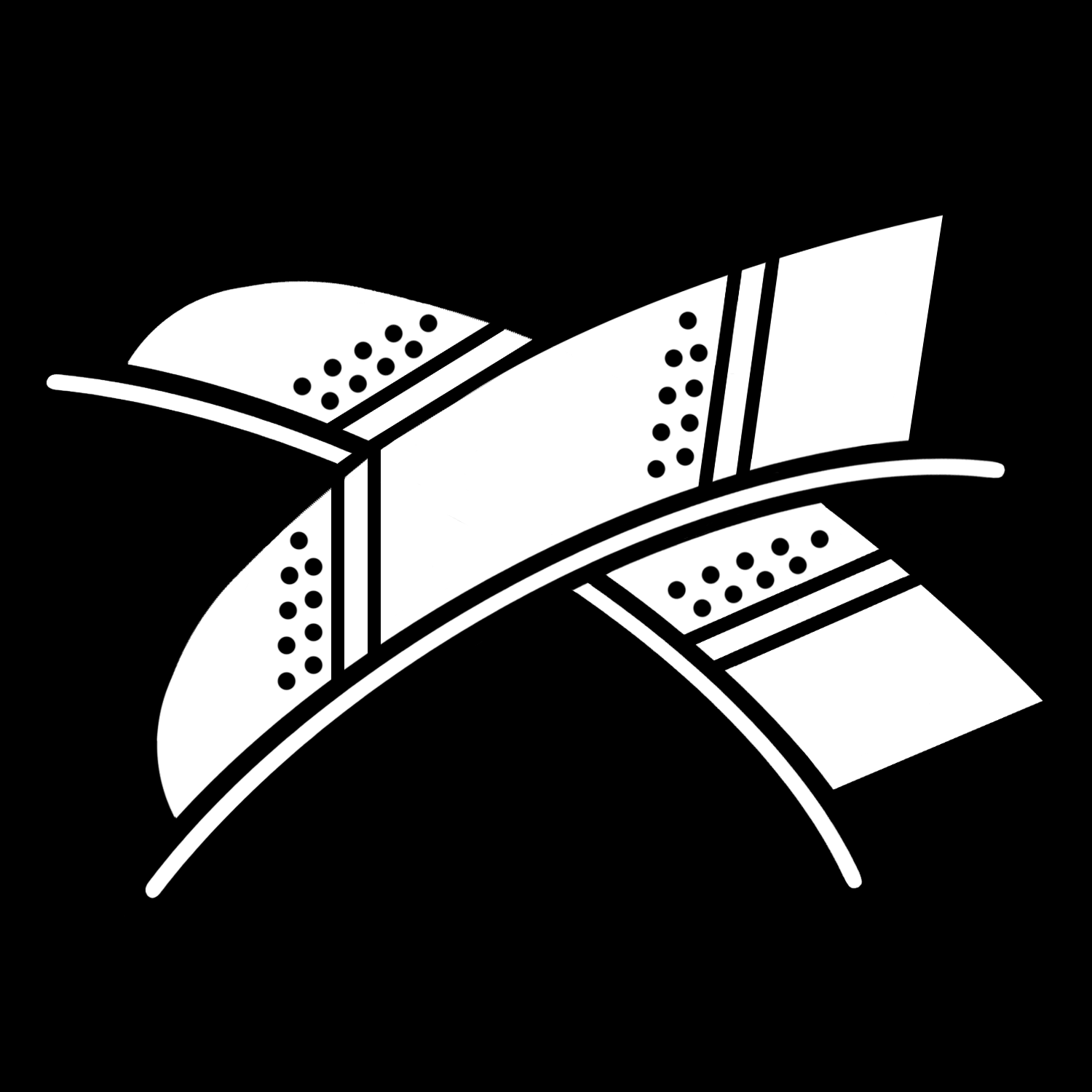
- Coat of arms of the Katagiri clan
- Home province: Ōmi Province
- Parent house: Imperial House of Japan
- Founder: Katagiri Yoshiki
- Final ruler: Katagiri Sadaatsu
- Founding year: 16-17th century
- Dissolution: July 15, 1871

The Katagiri clan (Japanese: 片桐氏 Katagiri-shi) were a family of Japanese swordsmen (Buke) from Ōmi Province, derived from the Seiwa Genji. During the Edo Period, they belonged to the Tozama daimyō.

== List of daimyō ==
| # | Name | Tenure | Courtesy title | Court Rank | kokudaka |
|---|---|---|---|---|---|
Katagiri clan, 1600 - 1871 (Tozama daimyō)
| 1 | Katagiri Sadataka (片桐 貞隆) | 1600 - 1627 | Chief (チーフ) | Junior 5th Rank, Lower Grade (従五位下) | 11,000 koku |
| 2 | Katagiri Sadamasa (片桐 定政) | 1627 - 1673 | Lower Stone Watcher (ロウワーストーンウォッチャー) | Junior 5th Rank, Lower Grade (従五位下) | 11,000 koku |
| 3 | Katagiri Sadafusa (片桐定房) | 1674 - 1710 | Chief (チーフ) | Junior 5th Rank, Lower Grade (従五位下) | 10,000 koku |
| 4 | Katagiri Sadaoki (さだ沖 片桐) | 1710 - 1741 | Lower Stone Watcher (ロウワーストーンウォッチャー) | Junior 5th Rank, Lower Grade (従五位下) | 16,000 koku |
| 5 | Katagiri Sadanari (片桐 定成) | 1741 - 1750 | Chief (チーフ) | Junior 5th Rank, Lower Grade (従五位下) | 11,000 koku |
| 6 | Katagiri Sadayoshi (貞能 片桐) | 1750 - 1787 | Lower Stone Watcher (ロウワーストーンウォッチャー) | Junior 5th Rank, Lower Grade (従五位下) | 10,000 koku |
| 7 | Katagiri Sadaaki (貞顕 片桐) | 1787 - 1822 | Shuzensho (修繕書) | Junior 5th Rank, Lower Grade (従五位下) | 11,000 koku |
| 8 | Katagiri Sadanobu (定信 片桐) | 1822 - 1841 | Sekimonomi (セキモノミ) | Junior 5th Rank, Lower Grade (従五位下) | 16,000 koku |
| 9 | Katagiri Sadanaka (定中 片桐) | 1841 - 1843 | Sado no kami (佐渡 の 髪) | Junior 5th Rank, Lower Grade (従五位下) | 16,000 koku |
| 10 | Katagiri Sadateru (貞光 片桐) | 1843 - 1862 | Ishimonomi (医師も飲み) | Junior 5th Rank, Lower Grade (従五位下) | 10,000 koku |
| 11 | Katagiri Sadatoshi (貞利 片桐) | 1862 | None (なし) | Junior 5th Rank, Lower Grade (従五位下) | 10,000 koku |
| 12 | Katagiri Sadaatsu (さだ圧 片桐) | 1862 - 1871 | None (なし) | Junior 5th Rank, Lower Grade (従五位下) | 10,000 koku |

== History ==
=== Middle Ages ===
Claiming to be of the noble lineage of the Taira, Minamoto, and Fujiwara clans, the Katagiri clan originated from Katagiri in Inada District, Shinano Province. According to the "Kanemasa Chikujō Keizu," the Katagiri family, who were prominent landowners in the Inada District of Shinano Province during the late Heian period, later moved to Ōmi as a branch of the Katagiri clan, adopting the name "Katagiri."

In the Azuma Kagami, it is recorded that Katagiri Yasukage, who inherited Kagemasa's position, was granted a favor directly from Minamoto no Yoritomo, and the territories that had been confiscated by the Taira clan were returned after more than 20 years (around June 23, 1184, Juei 3).

During the Jōkyū War, the Katagiri clan, under the command of the Kosaka and Mutō clans, advanced along the Nakasendō as part of the Shogunate army heading to Kyoto. At this time, Katagiri Genta, Tarō, and Matatarō fought valiantly against the forces of the Kyoto Protectorate, Iga Mitsukiyo, who encircled them. Katagiri Saburō's activities in the "Jōkyūki" are depicted as the battle at Kanzan in Owari Province.

As a reward for their service during the Jōkyū War, they were granted land in Hikonogo, Gifu Province, as a substitute for Yasukage. Subsequently, they settled in Takatsukimura, Ika District, Ōmi Province (now Nagahama City, Shiga Prefecture), where they established their domain.

=== Early Modern Period ===
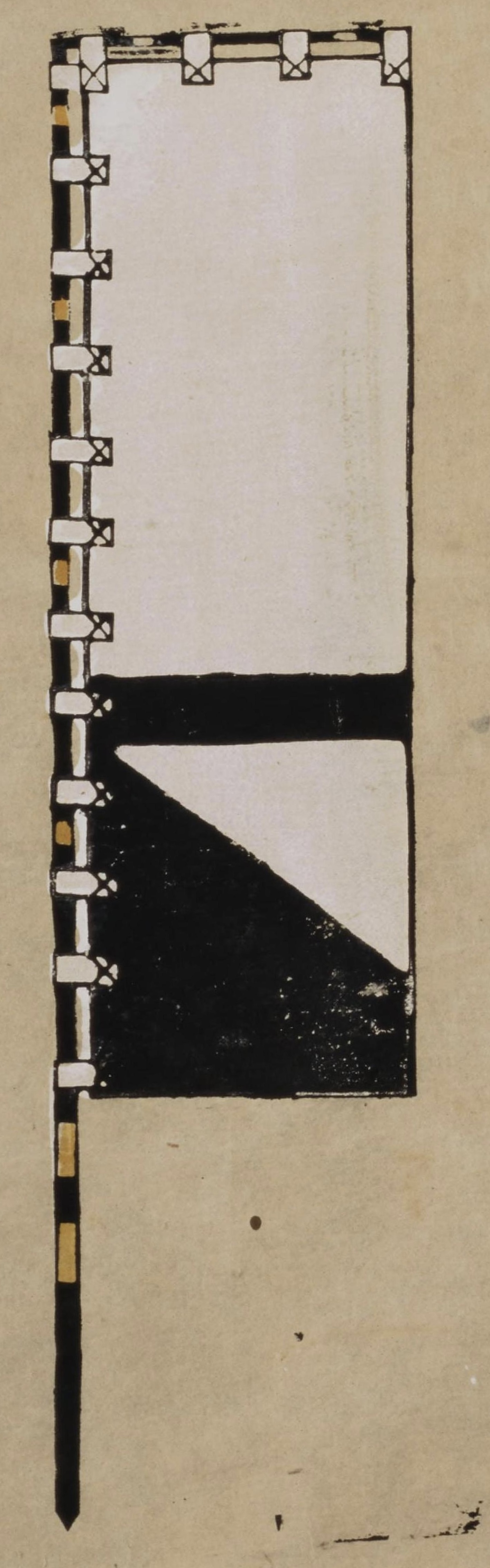
Katagiri Katsumoto and his Uma-jirushi

During the Sengoku period, the head of the Katagiri clan, Katagiri Katsumoto, became a retainer of the Azai clan, the feudal lords of northern Ōmi. After the fall of the Asai clan, Katsumoto's son, Katagiri Sadataka, served under Toyotomi Hideyoshi as one of the "Seven Spears of Shizugatake" and gained favor, receiving 50,000 koku (a unit of measure for rice, representing wealth) in Settsu Province. He was subsequently included among the daimyō. After the Battle of Sekigahara, Sadataka served as an advisor and elder to Toyotomi Hideyori. While receiving a fief of 50,000 koku from the Toyotomi clan, he also received land from the Tokugawa family, including Omi and Kameyama Castle, becoming a special case that received support from both the Tokugawa shogunate and the Toyotomi family. However, just before the outbreak of the Siege of Osaka, he retreated from Osaka Castle. After the Siege of Osaka, his fief was increased to 40,000 koku, but during the time of his grandson, Katagiri Sadamasa, the fief was confiscated due to Sadamasa's unyielding attitude.

On the other hand, Sadataka's younger brother, Katagiri Sadahisa, was given 10,000 koku in Koizumi, Yamato Province (now Koizumi-cho, Yamatokoriyama City, Nara Prefecture), and established the Koizumi Domain, which was later increased to 16,600 koku. Sadahisa's child, Sadamichi, became the second feudal lord of the Koizumi Domain. Sadamichi's child, Sadamune, was known as a tea master and the founder of the Katagiri school of tea ceremony, and his descendants maintained the domain. Although the Koizumi Domain eventually faced the threat of being abolished, it survived through adopting heirs twice. Additionally, the Koizumi Domain was divided into 3,000 koku for Sadamune's family and 1,000 koku for his younger son Sadamitsu, who became the founder of the Shimotakada Katagiri family. The Katagiri family continued to exist as hatamoto (direct retainers of the shogunate) until the Meiji Restoration.

Around the first year of the Genji era, Felice Beato photographed a panorama of Edo from Atagoyama, capturing the mansion of the Katagiri family of the Koizumi Domain in the center of the image.

=== Post-Meiji era ===
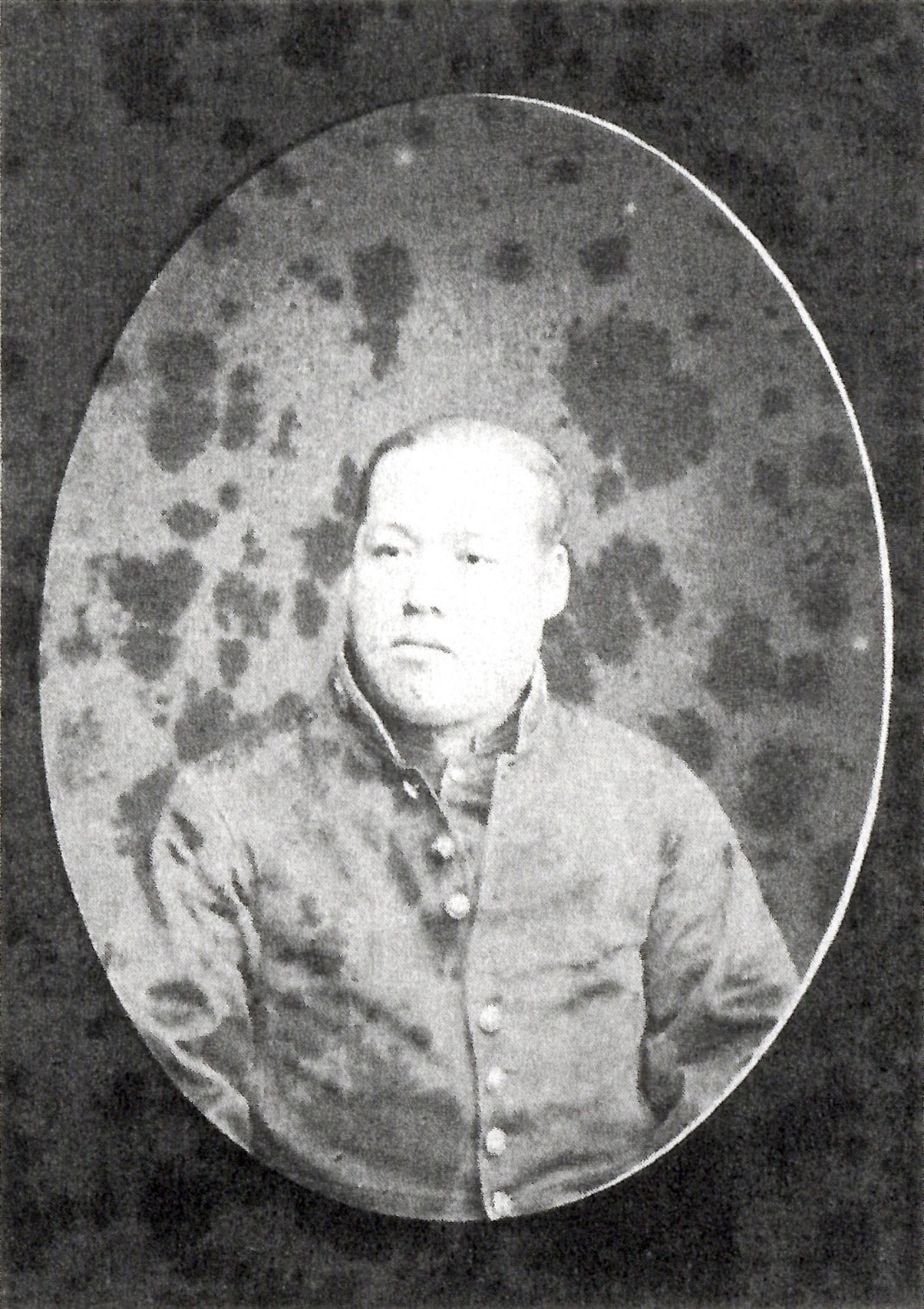
Katagiri Sadaatsu, final daimyō of the Koizumi Domain

The last Koizumi feudal lord, Katagiri Sadaatsu, was appointed as the governor of the Koizumi Domain on June 23, 1869, and served as the governor of the domain until their abolition on July 15, 1871.

== Literature ==
- Hashiba, Akira: Koizumi jinyao in: Miura, Masayuki (Hrsg.): Shiro to jinya. Saikoku-hen. Gakken, 2006. ISBN 978-4-05-604379-2.
- Takahashi, Ken‘ichi: Katagiri-ke. In: Kamon – Hatamoto hachiman koma. Akita Shoten, 1976.
- Edmond Papinot: Katagiri. In: Historical and Geographical Dictionary of Japan. Reprint of the 1910 version. Tuttle, 1972, ISBN 0-8048-0996-8.
- 太田, 亮 (1934), "片桐 カタギリ", 姓氏家系大辞典, vol. 第1, 上田萬年、三上参次監修, 姓氏家系大辞典刊行会, pp. 1513–1516, OCLC 673726070, JPNO 47004572, "国立国会図書館デジタルコレクション"NCID BN05000207 https://dl.ndl.go.jp/info:ndljp/pid/1130845/830
- "清和源氏 満快流 片桐". 寛政重修諸家譜 (in Japanese). Vol. 第2輯. 三上参次監修 (国立国会図書館デジタルコレクション ed.). 國民圖書. 1923 [1812]. pp. 1018–1027.
