= Saga Castle =

Japanese castle in Saga, Saga Prefecture, Japan

Saga Castle 佐賀城
- Saga, Saga prefecture, Japan
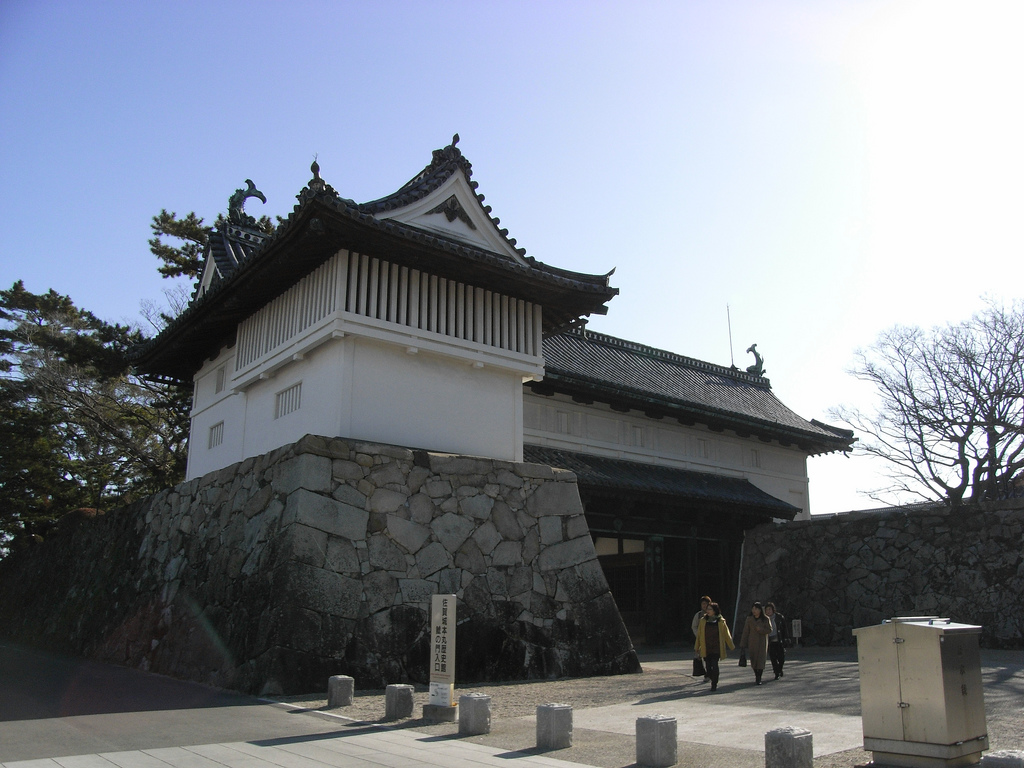
- Shachi-no-mon, surviving gate of Saga Castle from 1835

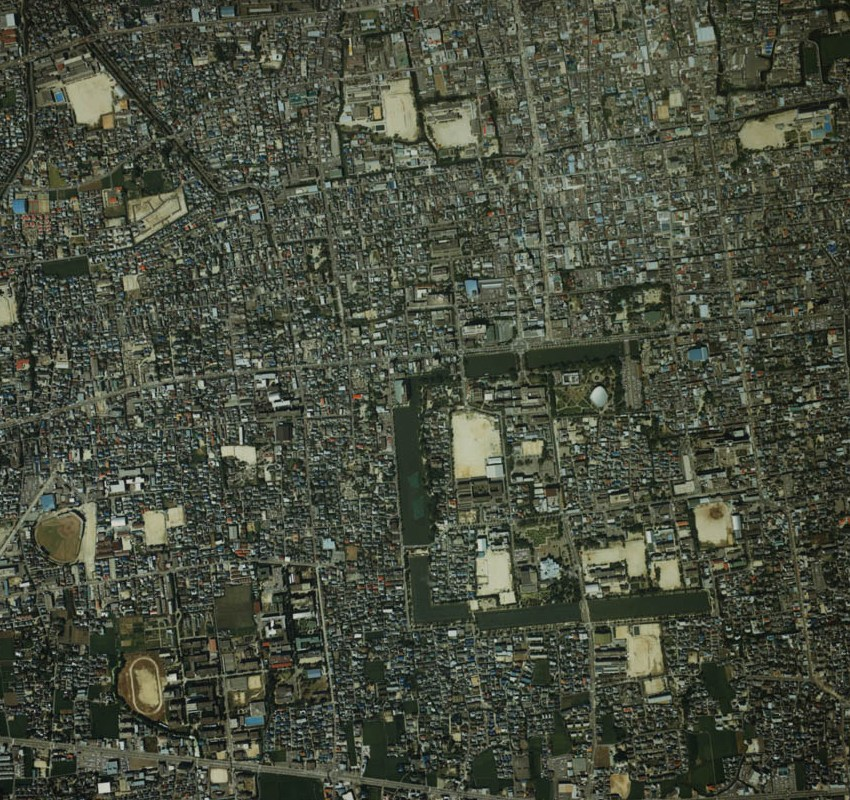

Site information
- Type: hiraijirō-style Japanese castle
- Open to the public: yes
- Condition: Some original buildings still intact, others rebuilt in 2004

Location
- Location within Saga Prefecture Location within Japan
- Coordinates: 33.245744°N 130.302153°E

Site history
- Built: 1602-1611, reconstructed 1728, 1836, 2004
- Built by: Nabeshima clan
- In use: Edo period
- Battles/wars: Saga Rebellion (1874)

Saga Castle (佐賀城, Saga-jō) is a Japanese castle located in Saga City, Saga Prefecture, Japan. It is a hiraijirō, a castle built on a plains rather than a hill or mountain, and is surrounded by a wall rather than being built above a stone base. Saga castle was home to the Nabeshima clan, daimyō of Saga Domain. It was also known as "Submerged Castle" (沈み城, Shizumi-jō).

== History ==
The location of Saga Castle was originally a fortified village under the control of the Ryūzōji clan, warlords of a small area of northern Kyūshū in the Muromachi period. After Ryūzōji Takanobu was defeated by a coalition of Shimazu and Arima forces in 1584, his retainer Nabeshima Naoshige gained control of the castle. Naoshige allied the clan with Toyotomi Hideyoshi and gained personal distinction during the Japanese invasions of Korea, during which time he befriended noted castle architect Katō Kiyomasa and future Shōgun Tokugawa Ieyasu. Following the Battle of Sekigahara, the Nabeshima clan was confirmed in its holdings in Hizen province, and Naoshige's son, Nabeshima Katsushige became 1st daimyō of Saga Domain. Naoshige began work on rebuilding the castle with the approval of the Tokugawa Shogunate beginning in 1602, with the work completed under Katsushige by 1611. The original structure included a five-storey donjon surrounded by a system of 80-metre wide moats. Unusually, the moats are not surmounted by stone walls, but by earthen ramparts tall enough to conceal the inner fortifications. These ramparts were also planted with pine and camphor trees for additional concealment, which lent the castle its nickname.

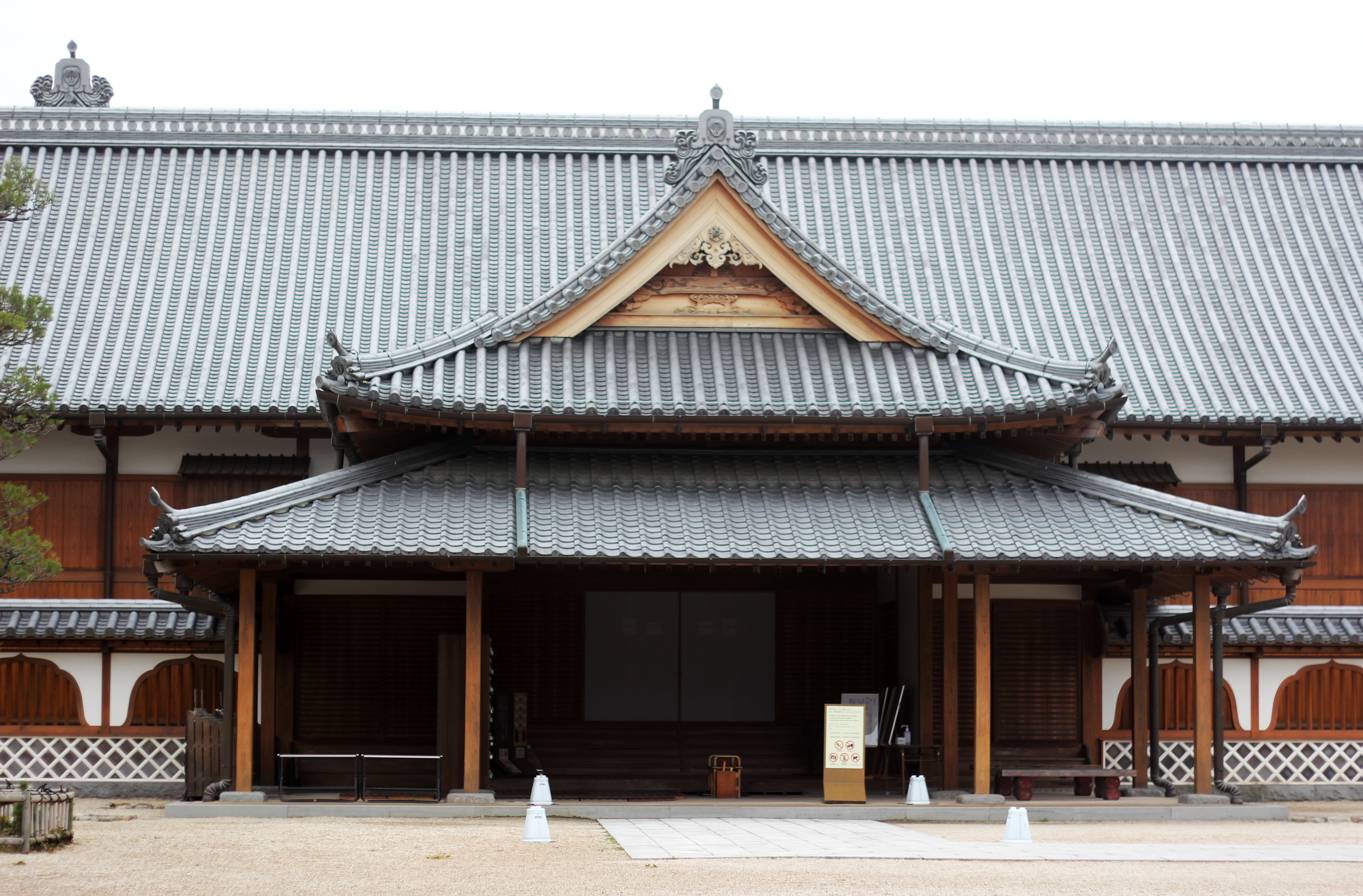
The reconstructed castle palace.

A fire in 1726 destroyed most of the castle structures, including the donjon. The palace portion was restored two years later in the outer bailey, which was the centre of the Saga domain government for most of the Edo period. Another fire occurred in 1835, after which the buildings were reconstructed by Saga domain's final daimyō Nabeshima Naomasa.

After the Meiji Restoration, the castle remained the location for the local government offices. However, the castle was occupied in 1874 by former politician and samurai Etō Shinpei and his following of disgruntled samurai in the Saga Rebellion. The rebels were defeated by military force, during which most of the buildings in the castle were burned down.

Since 1874, the castle grounds have been used as the site for a court building and a prefectural office, and in 1883 it became a junior school. The buildings were eventually replaced by modern school buildings. In 1953, one of the surviving gates of the castle was proclaimed a Saga Prefectural Important Cultural Property (PICP). It gained national protection (ICP) in 1957.

From 2001 to 2004 the main portion of the castle was restored. It is now houses the Saga Castle History Museum and is the largest wooden castle reconstruction in Japan. In 2006, Saga Castle was listed as one of the 100 Fine Castles of Japan by the Japan Castle Foundation.

Saga Castle is also the castle where Yamamoto Tsunetomo, the orator of Hagakure, worked.

== See also ==
- Saga Rebellion

== Literature ==
- De Lange, William (2021). An Encyclopedia of Japanese Castles. Groningen: Toyo Press. pp. 600 pages. ISBN 978-9492722300.
- Schmorleitz, Morton S. (1974). Castles in Japan. Tokyo: Charles E. Tuttle Co. pp. 144–145. ISBN 0-8048-1102-4.
- Motoo, Hinago (1986). Japanese Castles. Tokyo: Kodansha. p. 200 pages. ISBN 0-87011-766-1.
- Mitchelhill, Jennifer (2004). Castles of the Samurai: Power and Beauty. Tokyo: Kodansha. p. 112 pages. ISBN 4-7700-2954-3.
- Turnbull, Stephen (2003). Japanese Castles 1540-1640. Osprey Publishing. p. 64 pages. ISBN 1-84176-429-9.
