= Nabeshima clan =

Japanese samurai kin group

Nabeshima 鍋島
- Home province: Hizen
- Parent house: Shōni clan
- Titles: Lord of Hizen (Saga); Marquess (after the Meiji Restoration)
- Founder: Nabeshima Shigenao (Shōni Shigenao)
- Founding year: Late 15th century
- Cadet branches: Ogi branch (viscount) Hasunoike branch (viscount); Kashima branch (viscount); Takeo branch (baron) Shiroishi branch (baron)

The Nabeshima clan (鍋島氏, Nabeshima-shi) is a Japanese samurai clan associated with Hizen Province in north-western Kyushu. From the early seventeenth century until the abolition of the han system in 1871, its principal line ruled Saga Domain, while branches of the family ruled the Ogi, Hasunoike, and Kashima domains.

The Nabeshimas rose to prominence as retainers of the Ryūzōji clan, to whom they were also closely related by marriage and descent. Nabeshima Naoshige's mother was a daughter of Ryūzōji Iesumi, the grandfather of Ryūzōji Takanobu, making Naoshige and Takanobu cousins. Their relationship was further strengthened when Takanobu's mother, Keigin-ni, remarried Naoshige's father, Nabeshima Kiyofusa, making the two men stepbrothers as well.

After Takanobu was killed at the Battle of Okitanawate in 1584, Naoshige increasingly assumed responsibility for the administration of the Ryūzōji territories. The change was gradual rather than an immediate dynastic succession. When Ryūzōji Masaie retired in 1590, his young son Takafusa succeeded to the headship of the Ryūzōji family, while the administration of the territory remained in Naoshige's hands. After Takafusa and Masaie both died in 1607, Naoshige's son Nabeshima Katsushige succeeded to the former Ryūzōji position, establishing Nabeshima rule over Saga.

In the 19th century, the tenth lord of Saga, Nabeshima Naomasa, carried out extensive fiscal, administrative, educational and military reforms. Saga developed Western-style artillery, expanded its domain school, strengthened the defence of Nagasaki, and constructed reverberatory furnaces for the production of cannon. The last lord of Saga, Nabeshima Naohiro, lost his feudal office with the abolition of the domains in 1871. He later studied in England, served as Japanese minister to Italy, and was created a Marquess under the kazoku peerage system.

== History ==
=== Origins ===
The early origins of the Nabeshima clan are uncertain. Surviving genealogies give two different accounts of the family's ancestry. One tradition traces the family to the Uda Genji through the Sasaki clan. In this account, Nagaoka Tsunehide, a descendant of the Sasakis, settled at Nabeshima in Hizen and adopted the place-name as his surname. Another genealogy connects the Nabeshima with the Shōni clan, which claims descent from Fujiwara no Hidesato. According to this version, a member of the Shōni family succeeded to the Nabeshima lineage through his maternal relatives.

=== Service under the Ryūzōji clan ===
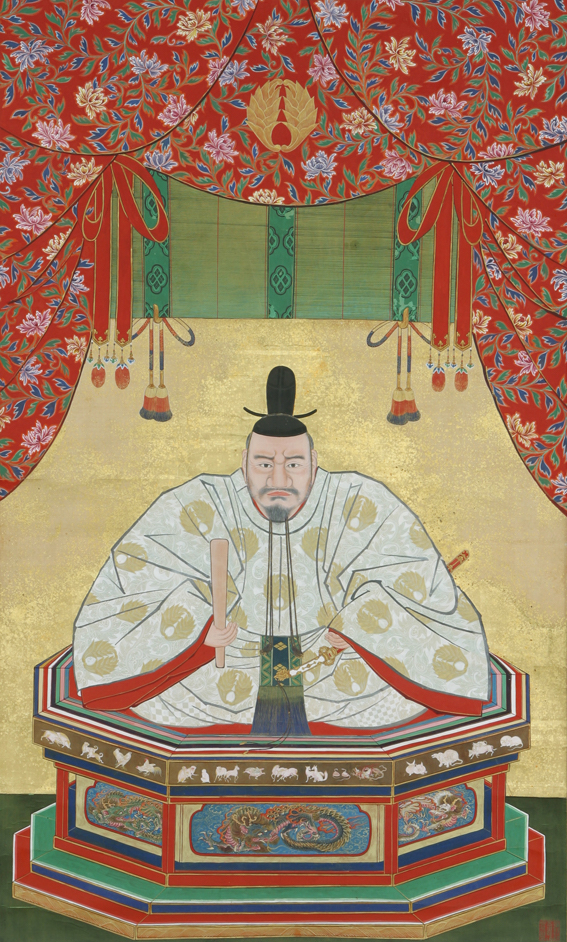
Nabeshima Naoshige, the first Nabeshima lord of Saga

By the 16th century, the Nabeshimas were closely connected with the Ryūzōji clan, one of the principal warrior families of Hizen. Nabeshima Kiyofusa was a Ryūzōji retainer, and his second son, Nabeshima Naoshige, was born in 1538 at the family's residence in Honjō. Naoshige served Ryūzōji Takanobu and took part in the military expansion of the Ryūzōji in northern Kyushu.

Takanobu was killed in battle in 1584. His son Ryūzōji Masaie remained head of the Ryūzōji family, but Naoshige assumed an increasingly important role in governing its territories. The distinction between the de-jure ruling position of the Ryūzōji clan and Naoshige's exercise of political authority continued after the establishment of Toyotomi Hideyoshi's supremacy over Kyushu.

In 1590, Masaie retired and his five-year-old son Takafusa succeeded as head of the Ryūzōji family. Naoshige, however, continued to administer the territory as a de-facto ruler. The contemporary political arrangement therefore did not amount to an immediate replacement of the Ryūzōji rule by the Nabeshimas: Takafusa retained the Ryūzōji headship, while Naoshige exercised the principal administrative authority.

=== Establishment of Nabeshima rule ===
The transition was completed only in the early seventeenth century. In 1607, Takafusa and his father Masaie died in close succession. Katsushige, the son of Naoshige, thereafter succeeded to the former Ryūzōji position and became the first lord of Saga under the Nabeshima house. Local histories consequently date the firm establishment of Nabeshima rule in Saga to 1607, rather than to the late Sengoku period.

Although political authority had passed to the Nabeshimas, the new regime incorporated former Ryūzōji retainers and related families. The organisation of Saga Domain consequently developed around both the main Nabeshima house and a number of collateral or semi-autonomous houses. This structure remained a distinctive feature of the domain throughout the Edo period.

=== Edo period ===
Under Katsushige and his successors, the Nabeshimas established a main line at Saga and several major branch houses. Three of these branches came to rule domains of their own: Ogi, Hasunoike and Kashima. Although the Tokugawa shogunate recognised these as separate domains, within Saga's internal political order their lords were subordinate to the head of the main Nabeshima house.

The Ogi house descended from Katsushige's eldest son Nabeshima Motoshige. In 1617 Motoshige received territory in Ogi that had formed part of Naoshige's retirement estate, and he subsequently became the first lord of Ogi. The shogunate formally recognised his house as a branch of the Saga Nabeshima in 1640. The Hasunoike house was established under Nabeshima Naozumi, another son of Katsushige, while the Kashima line developed as a further branch of the ruling family. Other Nabeshima cadet branches as well as powerful Ryūzōji branches occupied important positions and kept their own estates within Saga Domain without constituting branch domains on the same basis as Ogi, Hasunoike and Kashima.

Relations between the main domain and the three branch domains were not always straightforward. During the rule of the second Saga lord, Nabeshima Mitsushige, disputes developed over their respective status and obligations. In 1683 the Saga government promulgated the Sanke kakushiki (三家格式), regulations governing the relationship between the main house and the three branch houses.

=== Late Edo period and the Meiji Restoration ===
Nabeshima Naomasa succeeded as the tenth lord of Saga in 1830. Faced with serious financial difficulties, he undertook reforms of the domain's finances and administration and expanded the Kōdōkan, the domain school. The government also strengthened Saga's role in the defence of Nagasaki and increasingly adopted Western military science and technology.

From 1850, Saga constructed reverberatory furnaces for casting cannon and developed facilities for the manufacture and acquisition of Western-style weapons. The domain also promoted Western medicine and education. These measures made Saga an important centre of military and technical development in the final decades of the Tokugawa period.

Naomasa was succeeded in 1861 by his son Naohiro, the eleventh and last lord of Saga. During the Boshin War of 1868–1869, Saga forces fought on the side of the new imperial government. Following the abolition of the han system in 1871, Saga, Ogi, Hasunoike and Kashima ceased to exist as domains and were initially reorganised as prefectures.

=== Meiji period and the kazoku ===
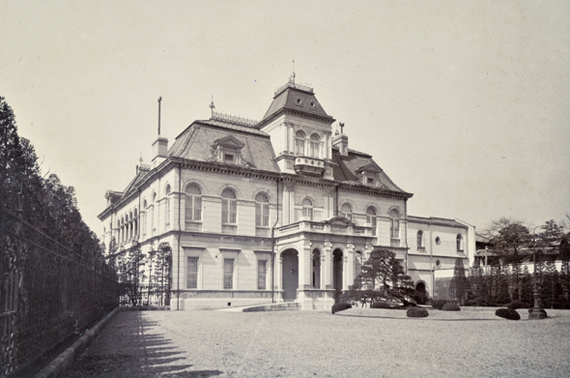
The Tokyo residence of the Nabeshimas in Nagatacho c. 1900

After the abolition of the domains, Naohiro studied in England and later entered the diplomatic service. He served as Japanese minister plenipotentiary to Italy from 1880 and subsequently became a member of the House of Peers and an imperial councillor. Under the 1884 Peerage Ordinance, the head of the former Saga ruling house was created a marquess. The Nabeshimas continued to form part of the Japanese peerage until the abolition of the kazoku under the post-war constitution in 1947.

=== Present day ===
The historical and cultural heritage of the main Saga branch of the Nabeshima family is preserved in part by the Nabeshima Houkoukai Foundation (公益財団法人鍋島報效会, Kōeki Zaidan Hōjin Nabeshima Hōkōkai), established in 1940 by Marquess Nabeshima Naomitsu, the twelfth head of the family. The foundation preserves historic sites associated with Saga Domain and the Nabeshima family, supports cultural and educational activities in Saga Prefecture, and operates the Chokokan museum in Saga. The museum preserves and exhibits historical documents, works of art and decorative objects inherited from the former daimyō and marquesses of the Nabeshima family.

As of 2026, the foundation is headed by Nabeshima Naomasa, the fifteenth head of the Saga Nabeshima family, who serves as its representative director and chairman.

== Family tree and succession ==
The following is a simplified family tree showing the relationship between the main Ryūzōji and Nabeshima lines and the three branch domains of Saga.

Simplified family tree of the Ryūzōji and Nabeshima houses
- Ryūzōji Iesumi (龍造寺家純)
  - Ryūzōji Chikaie (龍造寺周家)
    - Ryūzōji Takanobu (1529–1584)
      - Ryūzōji Masaie (1556–1607)
        - Ryūzōji Takafusa (1586–1607)
  - Keigin-ni (daughter) ∞ Nabeshima Kiyofusa (鍋島清房)
    - Nabeshima Naoshige (1538–1618)
      - Nabeshima Katsushige (1580–1657), 1st lord of Saga Domain
        - Nabeshima Motoshige (1602–1654), founder of the Ogi house
        - Nabeshima Tadanao (1613–1635), heir to Saga
          - Nabeshima Mitsushige (1632–1700), 2nd lord of Saga; main Saga line
        - Nabeshima Naozumi (1616–1669), founder of the Hasunoike house
        - Nabeshima Naotomo (鍋島直朝; 1622–1709), 3rd lord of Kashima Domain; later Kashima line

The Kashima branch had a somewhat different origin from the other two branch domains. It was initially established in 1609 by Nabeshima Tadashige (鍋島忠茂), Naoshige's second son. Tadashige was succeeded by his son Nabeshima Masashige (鍋島正茂). In 1642, Katsushige's son Naotomo succeeded to the lordship of Kashima, and the subsequent Kashima line descended from him.

=== Saga house ===
The Saga house was the senior line of the Nabeshima clan. Nabeshima Katsushige, son of Naoshige, succeeded Ryūzōji Takafusa in 1607 and became the first lord of Saga; the house continued to rule the domain until the abolition of the han system in 1871. After the Meiji Restoration, the former daimyō house was raised to the rank of marquess under the kazoku peerage system.

- Nabeshima Naoshige (1538–1618), founder of the Saga house
  - Nabeshima Katsushige (1580–1657), 1st lord of Saga; m. a daughter of Toda Katsutaka; secondly Kikuhime, daughter of Okabe Nagamori and adopted daughter of Tokugawa Ieyasu
    - Nabeshima Motoshige (1602–1654), 1st lord of Ogi
    - Nabeshima Tadanao (1613–1635), heir to the Saga house; m. Muri, daughter of Matsudaira Tadaaki
      - Nabeshima Mitsushige (1632–1700), 2nd lord of Saga; m. Torahime, daughter of Uesugi Sadakatsu, 2nd lord of Yonezawa; secondly Amahime, daughter of Nakanoin Michizumi
        - Nabeshima Tsunashige (1652–1706), 3rd lord of Saga; m. Fudai, daughter of Matsudaira Mitsumichi, lord of Fukui
        - Nabeshima Yoshishige (1664–1730), 4th lord of Saga
        - Nabeshima Muneshige (1686–1754), 5th lord of Saga; m. Sadahime, daughter of Kuse Michinatsu
          - Nabeshima Munenori (1718–1780), 6th lord of Saga; m. Tsunahime, daughter of Nakanoin Michimi
          - Nabeshima Shigemochi (1733–1770), 7th lord of Saga; m. Minamoto-hime, daughter of Date Munemura, 6th lord of Sendai; secondly Suehime, daughter of Tayasu Munetake
          - Nabeshima Harushige (1745–1805), 8th lord of Saga; m. Masahime, daughter of Nakanoin Michieda; secondly Tayohime, daughter of Ii Naoyuki, 10th lord of Hikone; thirdly Atsuhime, daughter of Matsudaira Norimori, 3rd lord of Iwamura
            - Nabeshima Naotomo (1798–1864), 8th lord of Hasunoike
            - Nabeshima Naonori (直彜), 9th lord of Kashima
            - Nabeshima Narinao (1780–1839), 9th lord of Saga; m. Sachihime, daughter of Ikeda Harumichi, lord of Tottori
              - Nabeshima Naonaga (直永), 10th lord of Kashima
              - Nabeshima Naosaga (直賢), 12th lord of Kashima
              - Nabeshima Naomasa (1815–1871), 10th lord of Saga; m. Morihime, daughter of Tokugawa Ienari, 11th shōgun; secondly Fudehime, daughter of Tayasu Nariyoshi
                - Mitsuhime (1839–1918); m. Matsudaira Naoyoshi, lord of Kawagoe
                - Hirohime; m. Hosokawa Morihisa, lord of Kumamoto
                - Nabeshima Naohiro (1846–1921), 11th lord of Saga and 1st Marquess Nabeshima; m. Taneko, daughter of Umetani Michitaru; secondly Nagako, daughter of Hirohashi Taneyasu
                  - Saeko (1870–1949); m. Maeda Toshitsugu, head of the former Kaga house
                  - Nabeshima Naomitsu (1872–1943), 12th head and 2nd Marquess Nabeshima; m. Teiko, daughter of Kuroda Nagatomo, Marquess Kuroda
                    - Nabeshima Naoyasu (1907–1981), 13th head and 3rd Marquess Nabeshima; m. Princess Kikuko, eldest daughter of Prince Asaka Yasuhiko
                      - Nabeshima Naomoto (1935–2008), 14th head
                        - Nabeshima Naomasa (born 1959), 15th head
                  - Itsuko (1882–1976); m. Prince Nashimoto Morimasa
                  - Nobuko (1886–1969); m. Matsudaira Tsuneo
                    - Setsuko Matsudaira (1909–1995); m. Yasuhito, Prince Chichibu
                  - Nabeshima Naotada (1889–1939), 14th head of the Kashima house
                - Nabeshima Naotora (1856–1925), 11th lord of Ogi
                - Nabeshima Naotō (1858–1910), 10th head of the Hasunoike house and 1st Viscount Nabeshima
    - Nabeshima Naozumi (1616–1669), 1st lord of Hasunoike
    - Nabeshima Naotomo (1622–1709), 3rd lord of Kashima
    - Ichihime; m. Uesugi Sadakatsu, 2nd lord of Yonezawa
      - Torahime (1635–1657); m. Nabeshima Mitsushige
