= Nabeshima Motoshige =

Daimyō of Ogi Domain

- 鍋島元茂
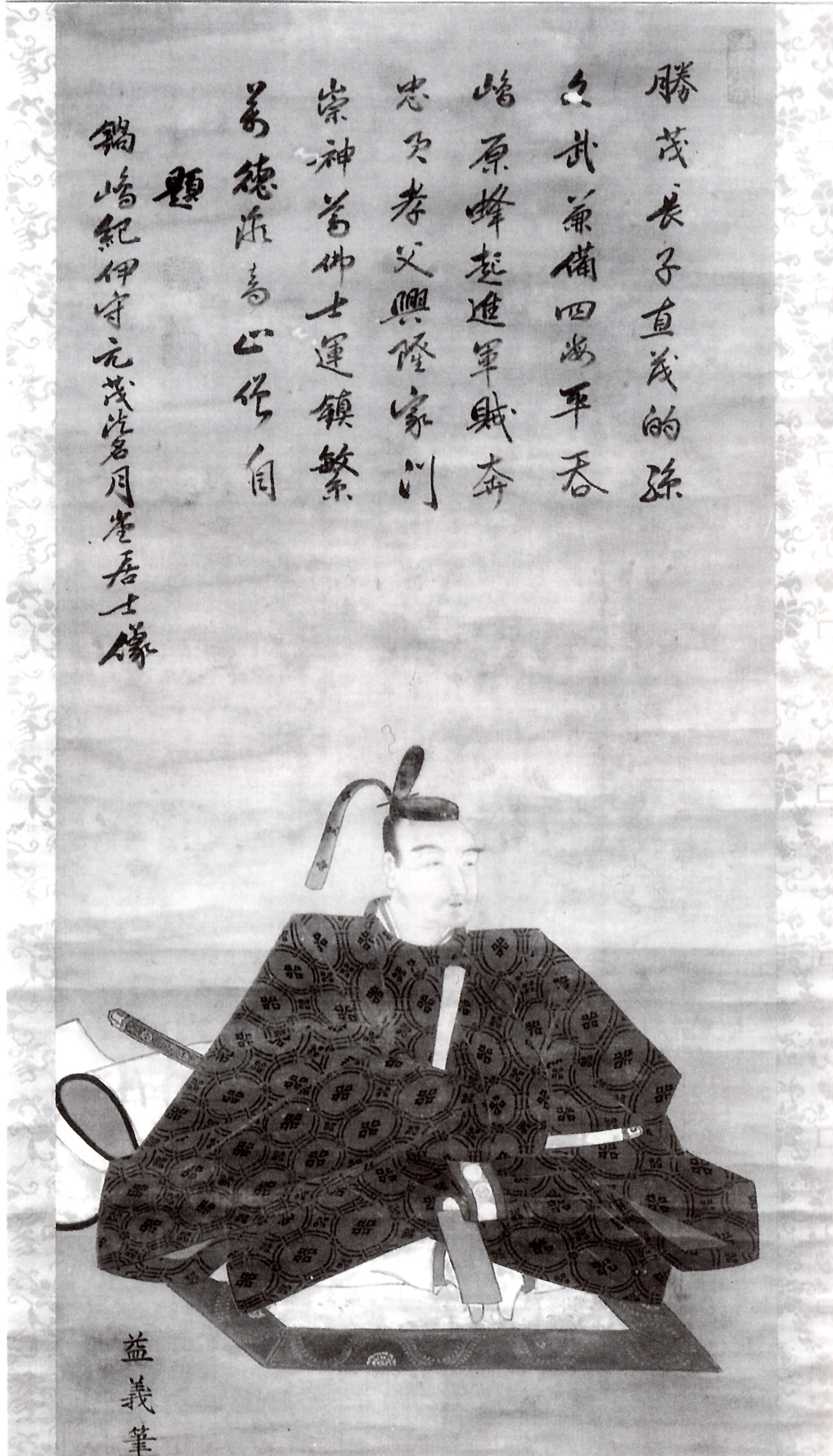

1st Lord of Ogi
- In office 1642–1654
- Succeeded by: Nabeshima Naoyoshi

Personal details
- Born: November 24, 1602
- Died: December 19, 1654 (aged 52)
- Parent: Nabeshima Katsushige (father)
- Relatives: Nabeshima Mitsushige (nephew); Nabeshima Tadanao (half-brother)

Military service
- Battles/wars: Shimabara Rebellion

Nabeshima Motoshige (鍋島 元茂, Nabeshima Motoshige; November 24, 1602 – December 19, 1654) was a Japanese daimyō of the Edo Period, who ruled the Ogi Domain.

He was the eldest son of Nabeshima Katsushige, the first lord of Saga Domain. Although he was the eldest son of Nabeshima clan, he was displaced in the line of succession for Saga Domain by his younger half-brother, Tadanao, whose mother was a daughter of shōgun Tokugawa Ieyasu, while his mother was a peasant woman named Oiwa. When his brother died, the office was succeeded by his nephew Mitsushige. He was a wise advisor to the third Tokugawa shogun Iemitsu and served as a chief retainer to Lord Nabeshima of Hizen.

In 1642, Ogi Domain was founded and Motoshige became its first daimyō.

He died in the third year of Jōō (1654), and his son, Naoyoshi, succeeded him.

Preceded by office created	1st Daimyō of Ogi; 1864-1871	Succeeded by Nabeshima Naoyoshi
