= Nabeshima Naoshige =

Warlord

Junior Fifth Rank, Lower Grade Nabeshima Naoshige
- 鍋島 直茂
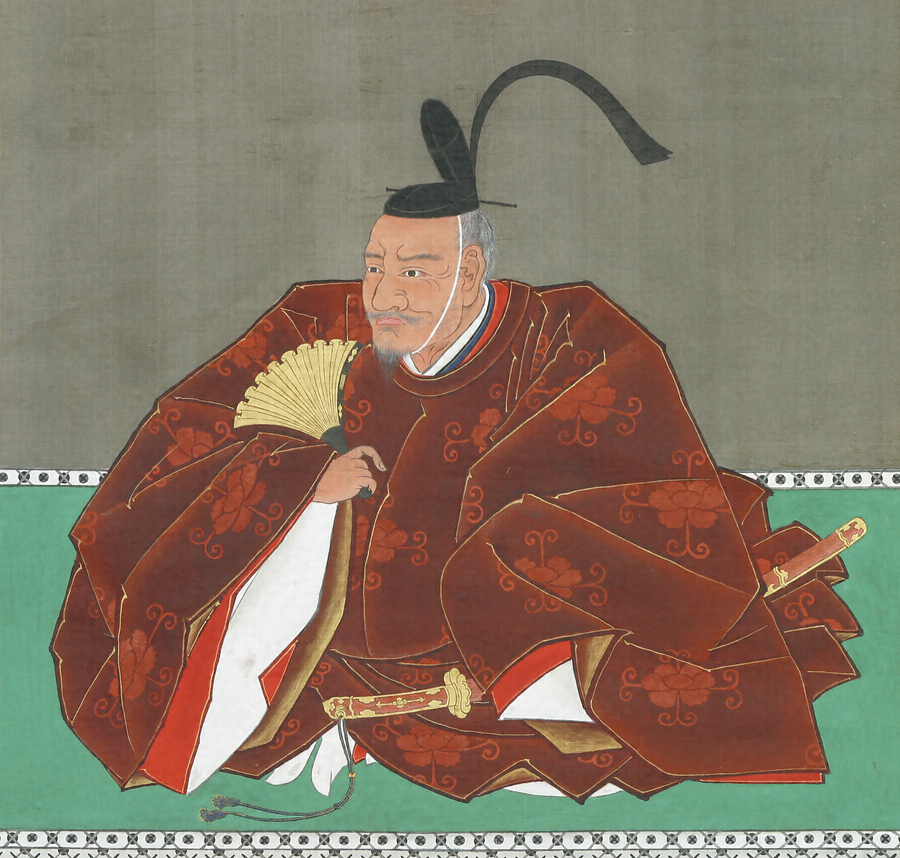
- 18th century portrait by Miura Shisan. From the Nabeshima family museum.

Lord of Saga domain
- In office 1607–1618

Personal details
- Born: April 12, 1538
- Died: July 24, 1618 (aged 80)
- Children: Nabeshima Katsushige
- Parents: Nabeshima Kiyofusa (father); Ryūzōji Iesumi's daughter (mother)
- Nickname: Nobumasa (信昌)

Military service
- Allegiance: Ryūzōji clan Toyotomi clan Eastern army Tokugawa Shogunate
- Battles/wars: Siege of Saga Castle; Battle of Imayama; Siege of Suko Castle; Battle of Okitanawate; Siege of Kurume; Kyushu Campaign; Korean campaign Siege of Udo; Siege of Yanagawa

Nabeshima Naoshige (鍋島 直茂; April 12, 1538 – July 24, 1618) was a warlord of the Sengoku and early Edo periods and progenitor of the Nabeshima lords of the Saga Domain. Naoshige was the second son of Nabeshima Kiyofusa (鍋島清房). His mother was the daughter of Ryūzōji Iesumi (龍造寺家純). He was a vassal of the Ryūzōji clan during the Sengoku period of the 16th century.

== Biography ==
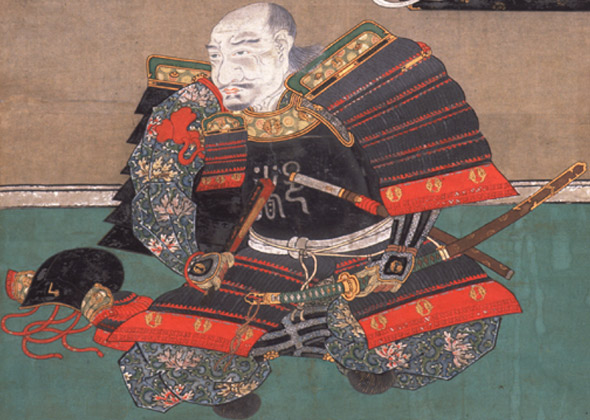
Portrait of Naoshige as warlord (Kōden-ji)

Naoshige proved himself in battle as he led forces of Ryūzōji Takanobu.

In 1570, Naoshige assisted Takanobu while at Saga Castle when it was surrounded by a 60,000-man Ōtomo clan army. However, Naoshige had only 5,000 troops, so he suggested a night raid on the enemies camp which successfully routed them.

In 1575, he attacked Suko Castle in western Hizen and forced its commander, Hirai Tsuneharu, to commit suicide.

In 1584, Naoshige also assisted Takanobu during the Battle of Okitanawate but was unable to prevent their rout which later ended in Takanobu's death. Naoshige was the chief retainer for the Ryūzōji Takanobu of Hizen, when Takanobu died, Ryūzōji's Saga Castle was taken over by Naoshige.

In 1585, Naoshige participated in the anti Ōtomo alliance massive invasion which led by Ryūzōji Ieharu against they Ōtomo clan. The alliance has begun their attacks towards Kurume town. However In April 23, two Ōtomogenerals Tachibana Dōsetsu and Takahashi Shigetane engaged the allied forces with the combination of skillful artillery salvos, defensive formation tactics, and timely counterattacks, which in the end caused the allied siege collapsed.

In 1587, Naoshige took this chance of having a weak heir to leave the Ryūzōji and to support Toyotomi Hideyoshi while during his battle against Kyūshū. Nabeshima distinguished himself in battle by killing hundreds of men.

In 1592, he was sent on Hideyoshi's Korean campaigns where he struck up a friendship with Katō Kiyomasa and upon his return to Hizen, with Tokugawa Ieyasu. Naoshige followed in leading over 12,000 men to Korea in the First Korean Campaign.

In 1600, Naoshige fought at Siege of Udo and Siege of Yanagawa in Tokugawa side. At the Battle of Sekigahara, Naoshige sent his son, Nabeshima Katsushige to assist Tokugawa Ieyasu. Following the victory of the Tokugawa clan, their 357,000-koku fief went untouched by Ieyasu.

Afterwards, control of the domain passed to Naoshige, much of the Ryūzōji clan territory, when Ryūzōji Masaie was killed in battle in 1607.

Following Naoshige's death his family became very well known.

Nabeshima's actions and sayings are immortalized in the third chapter of the Hagakure by writer Tsunetomo Yamamoto, a close attendant of Nabeshima Naoshige's grandson, Mitsushige.

== Legacy ==
Naoshige is known for re-settling potters from Korea in Hizen.

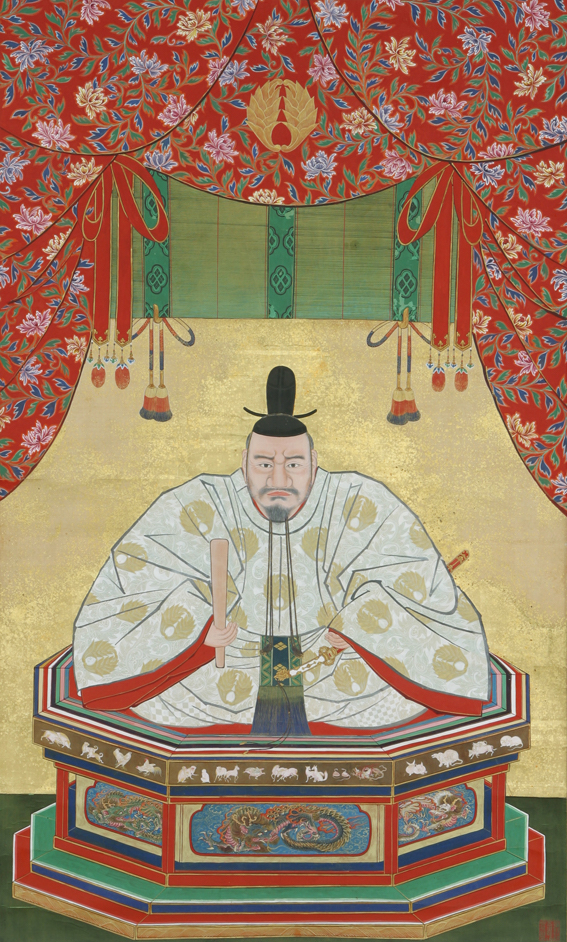
18th century portrait by Miura Shisan. From the Nabeshima family museum

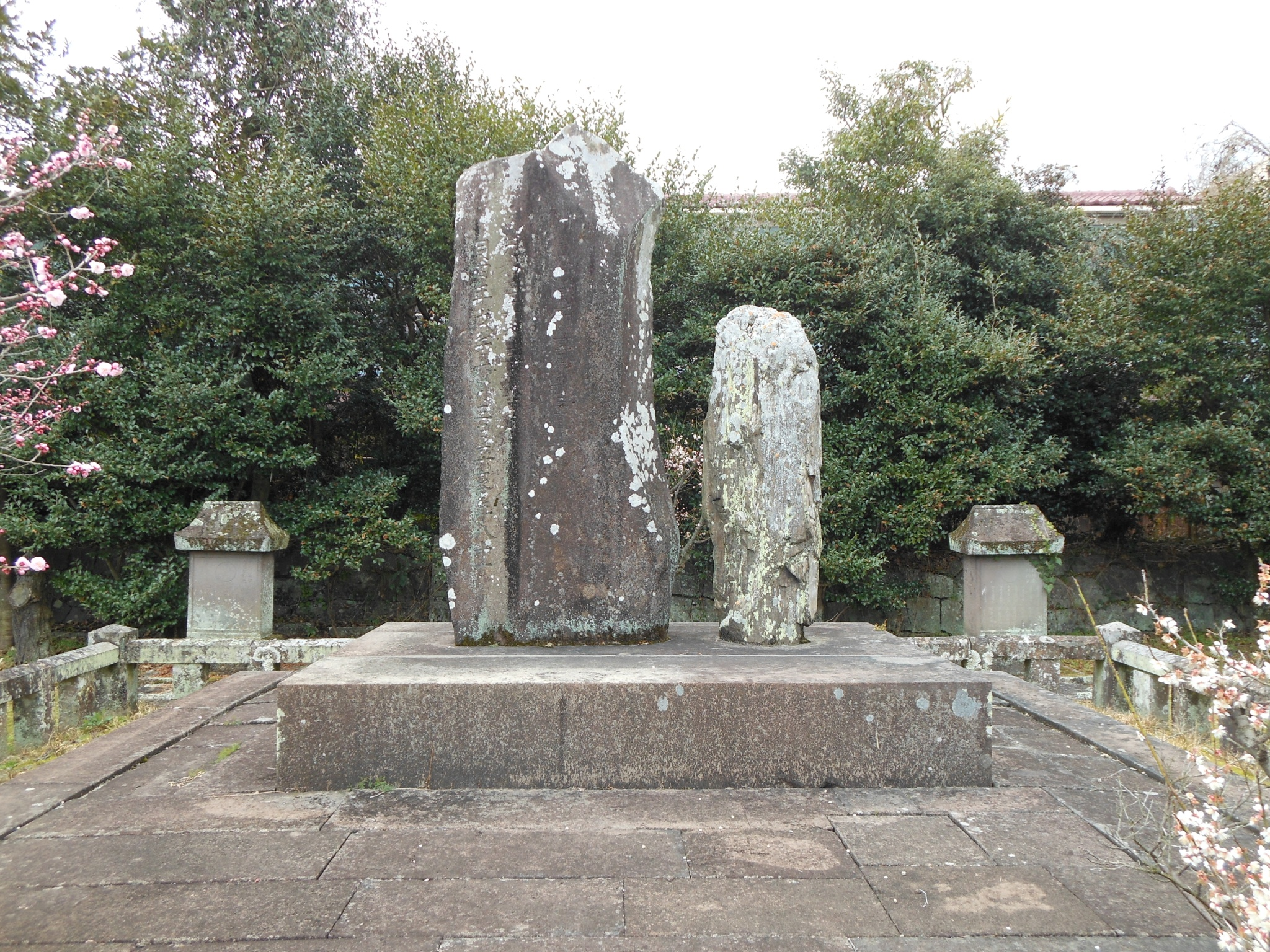
Nabeshima Naoshige's grave at Kōden-ji in Saga

== See also ==
- Miyohime
- Nabeshima ware

== Sources ==
- 吉永 正春 (2009). 筑前戦国史 増補改訂版 (in Japanese). 海鳥. ASIN 4874157394.
- *Yoshinaga, Masaharu (1977). 筑前戦国史 [Chikuzen Sengoku History]. 葦書房.ASIN B000J8REN4
