= Ogi Domain =

Japanese domain of the Edo period

Ogi Domain 小城藩
- Domain of Japan
- 1642–1871
- Mon of the Nabeshima clan
- Capital: Ogi jin'ya
  - Type: Daimyō
- Historical era: Edo period
  - Established: 1642
  - Disestablished: 1871
- Today part of: Saga Prefecture
- Location of Ogi Jin'ya Ogi Domain (Japan)

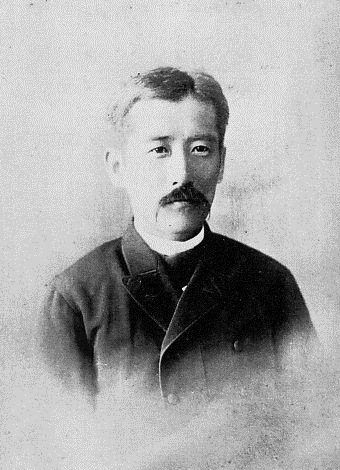
Nabeshima Naotora, final daimyō of Ogi Domain

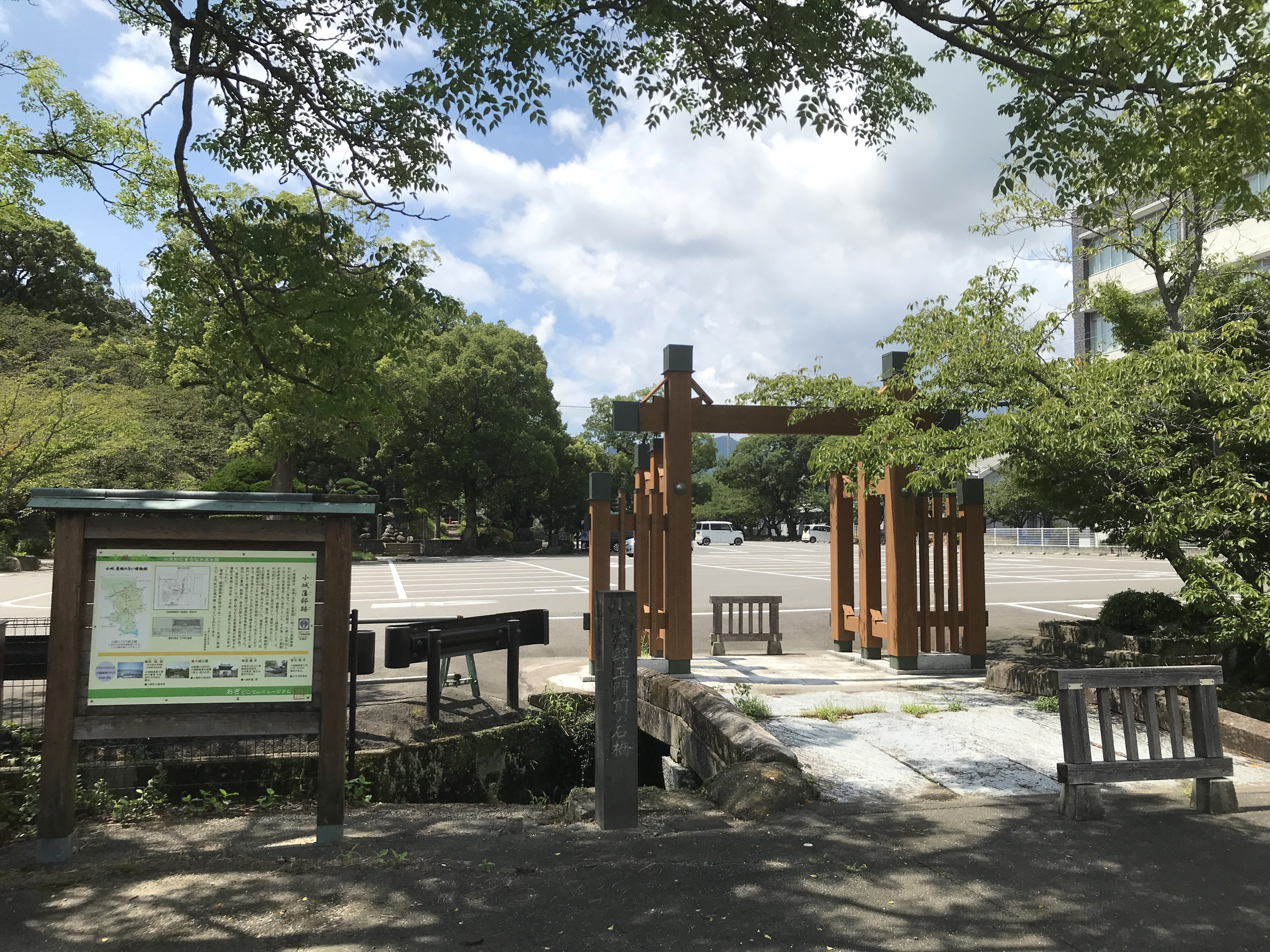
Site of Ogi jin'ya

Ogi Domain (小城藩, Ogi-han) was a Japanese domain of the Edo period. It was a sub-domain of Saga Domain. The headquarters of the domain were initially within the Nishi-no-maru of Saga Castle; later a jin'ya was erected in what is now the city of Ogi. It was ruled by a cadet branch of the tozama daimyō Nabeshima clan for all of its history.

== History ==
There are many theories about when Hasunoike Domain was established, as documentary evidence in unclear. Most accounts agree that it was created in 1642 for Nabeshima Motoshige, the eldest son of the first daimyō of Saga Domain, Nabeshima Katsushige. Although Motoshige was the eldest son, he was displaced in the line of succession for Saga Domain by his younger half-brother, Nabeshima Tadanao, whose mother was a daughter of Shōgun Tokugawa Ieyasu. Motoshige was assigned a kokudaka of 73,000 koku, which was taken directly from Saga Domain's revenues, with no specific estates granted. He also served as an advisor to Shōgun Tokugawa Iemitsu. The headquarters of the domain were within the Nishi-no-maru (west bailey) of Saga Castle. Nabeshima Motoshige's son, Nabeshima Naoyoshi became second daimyō and constructed a jin'ya in Ogi. Naoyoshi was famous as a literary daimyō. His son, Nabeshima Mototake rose to high positions within the Tokugawa shogunate under Shōgun Tokugawa Tsunayoshi; however, from his time onwards, the domain's financial situation was very severe and on the verge of bankruptcy, causing relations with the main line at Saga Domain to become increasingly strained.

During the time of the seventh daimyō, Nabeshima Naoyuki, the domain did not have enough funds for the shogunate's business and petitioned the shogunate for a loan, but this angered the shogunate and led to a scolding, and the daimyō of the main Saga Domain was also punished by being banned from entering Edo Castle. The ninth daimyō, Nabeshima Naotaka, wanted to become independent from Saga Domain with the prestige of a castle-holding daimyō, but his petition was rejected in 1816.

During the Boshin War of the Meiji Restoration, Nabeshima Naotora, the 11th and final daimyō, supported the Satchō Alliance was called upon to lead Ogi's forces against the Tokugawa remnants at Akita in northern Japan. For his loyalty to Emperor Meiji and efforts in the war, the revenues of Ogi Domain were raised by an additional 5,000 koku in August 1869. However, this reward was only nominal, as with the abolition of the han system less than two years later in 1871 Ogi Domain became Ogi Prefecture, and later became part of Imari Prefecture, Saga Prefecture, Mizuma Prefecture, and Nagasaki Prefecture, before being incorporated back into Saga Prefecture.

Nabeshima Naotora and his heirs were granted the title of viscount (shishaku) under the kazoku peerage. The site of Ogi jin’ya is now Ogi park, noted for its gardens, Shinto shrine and sakura blossoms.

== Holdings at the end of the Edo period ==
As with most domains in the han system, Oki Domain consisted of several discontinuous territories calculated to provide the assigned kokudaka, based on periodic cadastral surveys and projected agricultural yields.

- Hizen Province
  - 4 villages in Saga District
  - 46 villages in Ogi District
  - 18 villages in Matsura District

== List of daimyō ==
#	Name	Tenure	Courtesy title	Court Rank	kokudaka
Nabeshima clan, 1642–1871 (Tozama daimyō)
1	Nabeshima Motoshige (鍋島元茂)	1642–1654	Kii-no-kami (紀伊守)	Lower 5th, Junior grade (従五位下)	73,000 koku
2	Nabeshima Naoyoshi (鍋島直能)	1654–1679	Kaga-no-kami (加賀守)	Lower 5th, Junior grade (従五位下)	73,000 koku
3	Nabeshima Mototake (鍋島元武)	1679–1713	Kii-no-kami (紀伊守)	Lower 5th, Junior grade (従五位下)	73,000 koku
4	Nabeshima Motonobu (鍋島元延)	1713–1714	Kaga-no-kami (加賀守)	Lower 5th, Junior grade (従五位下)	73,000 koku''
5	Nabeshima Naohide (鍋島直英)	1714–1744	Kaga-no-kami (加賀守)	Lower 5th, Junior grade (従五位下)	73,000 koku
6	Nabeshima Naokazu (鍋島直員)	1744–1764	Kii-no-kami (紀伊守)	Lower 5th, Junior grade (従五位下)	73,000 koku
7	Nabeshima Naomasu (鍋島直愈)	1764–1794	Kaga-no-kami (加賀守)	Lower 5th, Junior grade (従五位下)	73,000 koku
8	Nabeshima Naotomo (鍋島直知)	1794–1804	Kii-no-kami (紀伊守)	Lower 5th, Junior grade (従五位下)	73,000 koku
9	Nabeshima Naotaka (鍋島直堯)	1804–1850	Kii-no-kami (紀伊守)	Lower 5th, Junior grade (従五位下)	73,000 koku
10	Nabeshima Naosuke (鍋島直亮)	1850–1864	Kaga-no-kami (加賀守)	Lower 5th, Junior grade (従五位下)	73,000 koku
11	Nabeshima Naotora (鍋島直虎)	1864–1871	Kii-no-kami (紀伊守)	Lower 5th, Junior grade (従五位下)	73,000 koku

== See also ==
- List of Han
- Abolition of the han system
