= Keigin-ni =

Keigin-ni (慶誾尼) was a Japanese noble woman member of Ryūzōji Clan during the Sengoku period. She is described as a described as a courageous woman and always carried a short sword named ''Fumonshu''.

== Biography ==
Born as the daughter of Ryūzōji Tanekazu, the sixteenth head of the Muranaka-Ryūzōji, the primary branch of the Ryūzōji clan. She would go on to become the wife of Ryūzōji Kaneie and had a son named Ryūzōji Takanobu. However, it is suggested that Kaneie's second and third sons, Ryūzōji Nobukane and Ryūzōji Naganobu, may have had a different mother.

In 1545, Kaneie was assassinated, allegedly as part of a plot orchestrated by Baba Yorichika, a senior retainer of the Shōni clan.

In 1556, Keigin-ni embarked on a new chapter of her life by marrying Nabeshima Kiyofusa, a loyal retainer of the Ryūzōji clan. This union resulted in her becoming the stepmother of Kiyofusa's lineal heir, Nabeshima Naoshige. As a result, Takanobu and Naoshige were not only cousins but also in-laws to each other.

=== Battle of Imayama ===
In 1570, during the intense Battle of Imayama, Saga Castle found itself besieged by a overnumbered army under the command of Ōtomo Sōrin. This situacion led to a loss of morale within the castle walls, with Takanobu and Nobuo contemplating surrender to the Ōtomo. Keigin-ni, displaying remarkable courage and wisdom, confronted Takanobu, rebuking him for his timidity. She urged him to rely on Nobumasa and launch a assault against the Ōtomo forces on Mount Ima. This decision led to the successful counterattack against the besiegers. Throughout this period, Keigin-ni played a role in shaping decisions and providing support to Takanobu.

=== After Takanobu's passing ===
Following Takanobu's demise in the Battle of Okitanawate in 1584, Keigin-ni continued her active involvement in the governance of the province, extending her support to Ryūzōji Masaie, who assumed leadership of the clan.

In 1587, Masaie joined the forces of Toyotomi Hideyoshi against the Shimazu clan. In the same year, he was confirmed as head of the Saga Domain (350,000 koku), later the control of the domain passed to Nabeshima Naoshige

=== Death ===
Keigin-ni died on 1 March 1600. While historical records suggest she lived to the remarkable age of ninety-two, there are varying theories regarding her true age..

== Sources ==
- Yoshimi Miyamoto, "Ryuzoji Takanobu's Mother: Keishinni," edited by Tetsuo Owada, "Sengoku Women" (Kawade Shobo Shinsha, 2005)
- Suzuki (Miyajima) Atsuko, "About Ryuzoji Takanobu and Mother Keishini," Saga University Regional Studies Creation Project ed. Saga Studies II (Iwata Shoin, 2014)
- 佐賀新聞社 (2006/12).『五州二島の太守龍造寺隆信』. ISBN 4882981610
