= Kōden-ji =

Buddhist temple in Saga, Japan

Enichi-san Kōden-ji 恵日山高傳寺 (高伝寺)
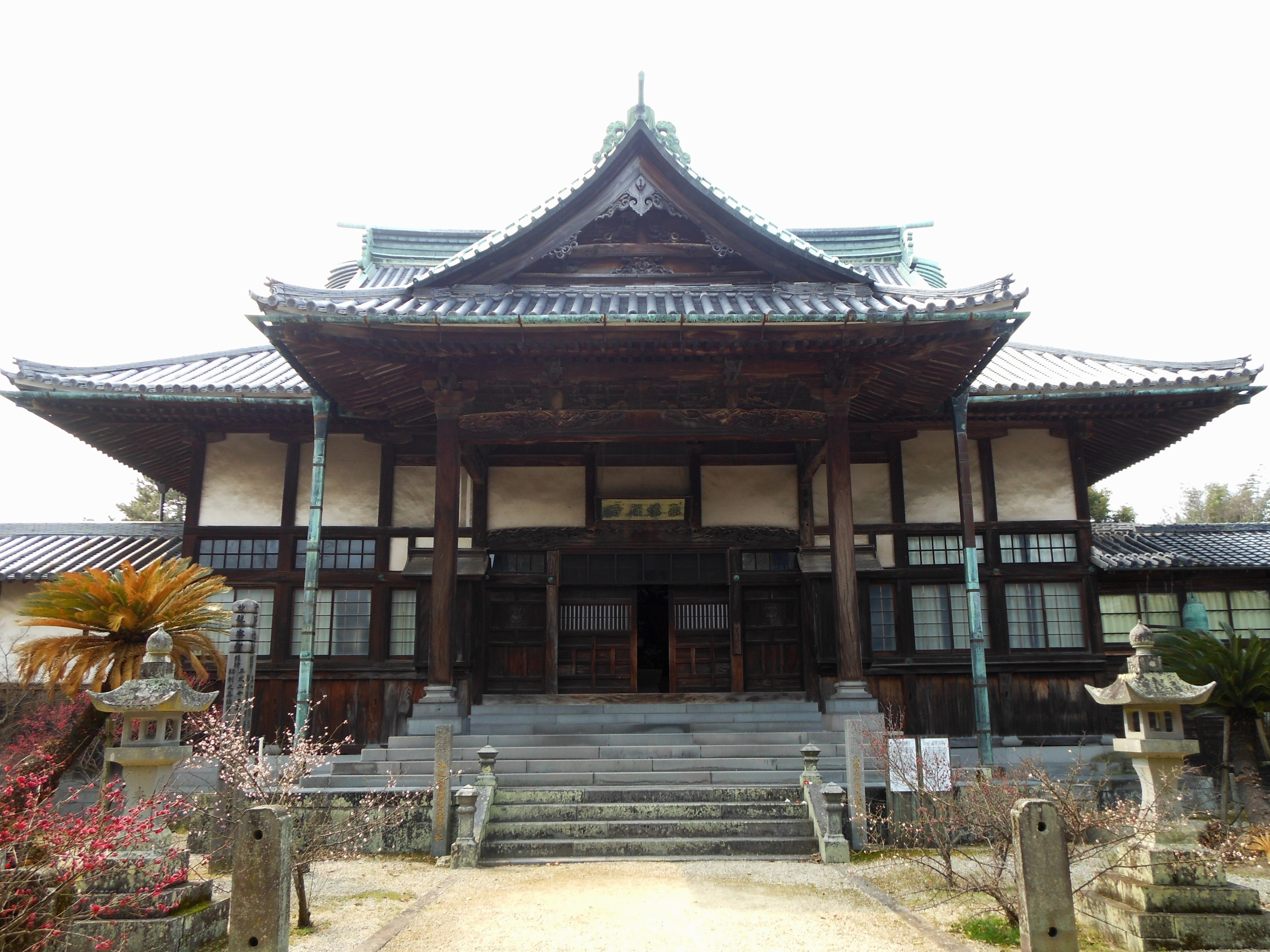
- Hondō

Religion
- Affiliation: Sōtō

Location
- Location: 1112-1 Honjō, Honjō-machi, Saga, Saga Prefecture
- Country: Japan
- Interactive map of Enichi-san Kōden-ji 恵日山高傳寺 (高伝寺)
- Coordinates: 33°14′16″N 130°16′59″E

Website
- Official website

Kōden-ji (高傳寺) is a Sōtō Zen temple in Saga, Saga Prefecture, Japan. It was the bodaiji or family temple of the Ryūzōji and Nabeshima clans, many of whom are buried in its grounds.

== See also ==
- Saga Prefectural Museum
