= Mitsushige =

- Gender: Male

Origin
- Origin: Japanese
- Meaning: Different meanings depending on the kanji used

Mitsushige (written: 光茂 or 光重) is a masculine Japanese given name. Notable people with the name include:

- Nabeshima Mitsushige (鍋島 光茂; 1632–1700), Japanese daimyō
- Niwa Mitsushige (丹羽 光重; 1622–1701), Japanese samurai and daimyō
