= 義勇 =

義勇, meaning "justice and brave", is an Asian given name.

It may refer to:

- Giyū Tomioka (冨岡 義勇), fictional character from the manga Demon Slayer: Kimetsu no Yaiba
- Shima Yoshitake (島 義勇, 1822 –1874), samurai from Saga domain
- Song Ui-young (송의영; 宋義勇; born 1993), Singapore professional footballer
- Yoshio Miyajima (宮島 義勇, 1909–1998), Japanese cinematographer
- Yoshitake Miwa (三和 義勇, 1899–1944), Captain of 1st Air Fleet
