= Yamamoto Tsunetomo =

Japanese samurai (1659–1719)

- 山本 常朝
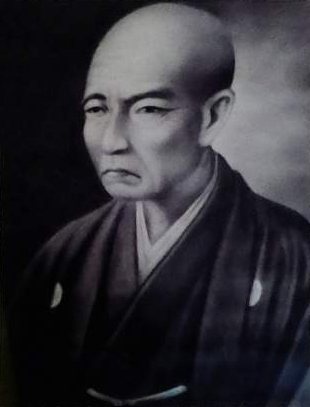
- Born: June 11, 1659; Katadae Yokokoji, Saga Domain, Hizen, Japan
- Died: November 30, 1719 (aged 60); Okoguma, Saga Domain, Hizen, Japan
- Other name: Yamamoto Jōchō
- Occupations: Samurai; Monk

Yamamoto Tsunetomo (山本 常朝), Buddhist monastic name Yamamoto Jōchō (June 11, 1659 – November 30, 1719), was a samurai of the Saga Domain in Hizen Province under his lord Nabeshima Mitsushige. He became a Zen Buddhist priest and relayed his experiences, memories, lessons, ideas, and aphorisms to the samurai Tashiro Tsuramoto, who compiled them under the title Hagakure.

== Early life and education ==
Yamamoto Tsunetomo was born 11 June 1659 to Yamamoto Jin'emon, then aged 71, and a woman whose maiden name was Maeda. He was the last born to the family, and regarded by his father as a superfluous addition who was intended to be given away to a salt merchant. For most of his childhood, Tsunetomo was sickly and claimed doctors told him he would not live past twenty years old. Despite his fragile health, he was employed at age 9 to be a page for Nabeshima Mitsushige. Tsunetomo's skills in literature led Mitsushige to have him study under noted man of letters Kuranaga Rihei.

In his twenties, Tsunetomo studied under the Zen Buddhist priest Tannen and the Confucian scholar Ishida Ittei, both of whom greatly influenced his philosophy. The last major influence in Tsunetomo's education was his nephew Yamamoto Gorōzaemon, who was older than Tsunetomo and helped him get a position as a scribe in Edo and then in the imperial capital Kyoto in 1686. In 1687, Gorōzaemon took responsibility for a large destructive fire, leading to him and Tsunetomo both resigning from their positions. Tsunetomo returned to work for Mitsushige.

== Buddhist priesthood ==
In 1695, Mitsushige retired due to ill health, and tasked Tsunetomo with finding a copy of a book of secret poetry instructions called Kokindenju. Tsunetomo obtained a copy in Kyoto and on 1 May 1700, presented it to Mitsushige, who died two weeks later. Tsunetomo intended to commit suicide to follow his master in death, but both Mitsushige and the shogunate as a whole had banned the practice. Instead of continuing as a samurai seeking minor positions, Tsunetomo became a Buddhist priest and his wife became a nun, living in a hermitage in the mountains.

== Hagakure ==
Later in life, (between 1709 and 1716), Tsunetomo narrated many of his thoughts to the samurai Tashiro Tsuramoto. Many of these aphorisms concerned his lord's father and grandfather Naoshige and the failing ways of the samurai caste. These commentaries were compiled and published in 1716 under the title of Hagakure (葉隠), a word that can be translated as either In the Shadow of Leaves or Hidden Leaves.

The Hagakure was not widely known during the years following Tsunetomo's death, but by the 1930s it had become one of the most famous representatives of bushido taught in Japan. In 2011 a manga/comic book version was published Hagakure: The Manga Edition, translated by William Scott Wilson, adapted by Sean Michael Wilson and Chie Kutsuwada (Kodansha International Ltd., 2011).

Tsunetomo believed that becoming one with death in one's thoughts, even in life, was the highest attainment of purity and focus. He felt that a resolution to die gives rise to a higher state of life, infused with beauty and grace beyond the reach of those concerned with self-preservation. Some viewed him as a man of immediate action due to some of his quotes, and in the Hagakure he criticized the carefully planned Akō vendetta of the Forty-seven rōnin (a major event in his lifetime) for its delayed response, stating that if Lord Kira, the rōnin's enemy, had died of illness during that time, it would have been "extremely regrettable".

== Legacy ==
During Japan's militarist years in the 1930s and 1940s, soldiers hailed Hagakure as a key text for proper samurai behaviour.

The Hagakure was the book that the character Ghost Dog reads and lives his life by in the movie Ghost Dog: The Way of the Samurai.

== See also ==
- Fukuzawa Yukichi
- Nakae Chōmin
- Natsume Sōseki
- Nitobe Inazō
- Susumu Nishibe
- Tsuneari Fukuda
- Yukio Mishima
