= Kakurin-tei =

Tea house in Saga City, Japan

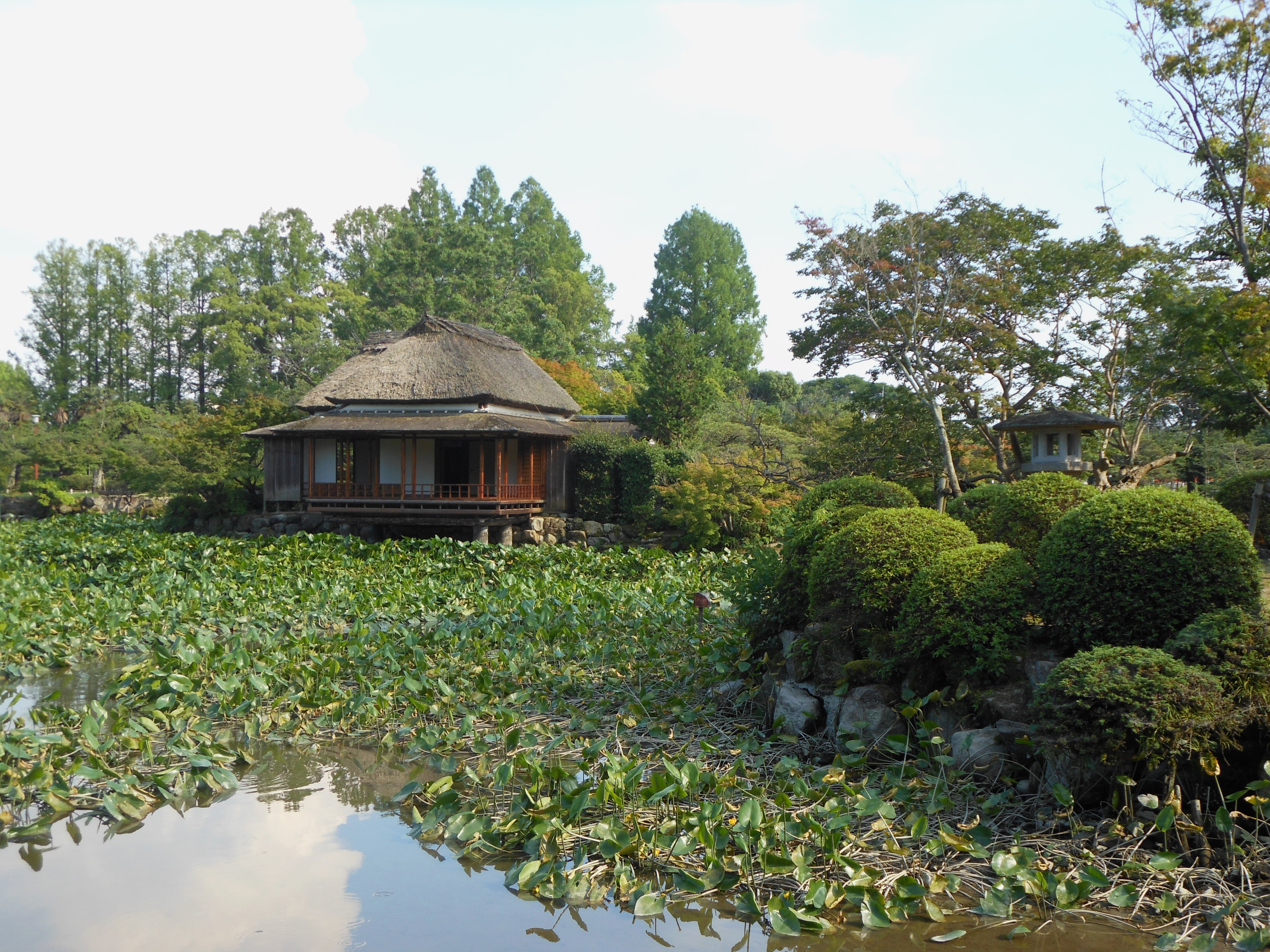
Kakurin-tei tea house

Kakurin-tei (隔林亭) is a Japanese tea house located in the grounds of Kōno Park, Saga City, Japan. The tea house was originally built by Lord Nabeshima Naomasa.

== History ==
The house was constructed in November 1846 (Kouka 3) at Kōno Park, at the command of the 10th lord of the Saga clan, Lord Naomasa Nabeshima. It served the clan as a guest house, with visitors including Fulbeck and Toshimichi Okubo among others. Lord Naomasa was recognized as one of the most successful and powerful leaders of Japan in his time, and it is said that he relaxed from the rigors of politics at this tea house while composing poetry.

Shortly before the Meiji Restoration when the clan system was abolished, the Kakurintei was transferred to the hands of Kazuma Nakano, a family retainer. His eldest son Chiaki then transferred ownership to the Saga Prefectural Girls' High School in Jonai, Saga City. Shortly thereafter, Japan entered the Second World War, and the structure gradually fell into disrepair. In 1960, it was cleared along with the Girls' School itself.

In 1986 the Kakurintei Document was discovered, some 140 years after it was erected and a movement to reconstruct the Kakurintei was started under the auspices of the Saga Prefectural Culture Federation, the Saga Prefectural Tea Ceremony Association and other groups. Reconstruction was finally approved as a part of the commemoration of the 100th anniversary of the establishment of Saga City as a municipality in 1989.

The reconstruction was based on one photograph, several old drawings, and the original structural materials, with the aid of computer analysis. After one year and five months, the structure was completed. Reborn as the Heisei Kakurintei, this famous building carries on the glorious intent of Lord Naomasa and will continue to be beloved by the people of Saga.
