= Kinoshita Masanao =

Japanese samurai

Kinoshita Masanao (木下 昌直, ? – May 4, 1584) was a Japanese samurai of the Sengoku period, who served the Ryūzōji clan.
