= Junshi =

Medieval Japanese act of vassals committing suicide for the death of their lord

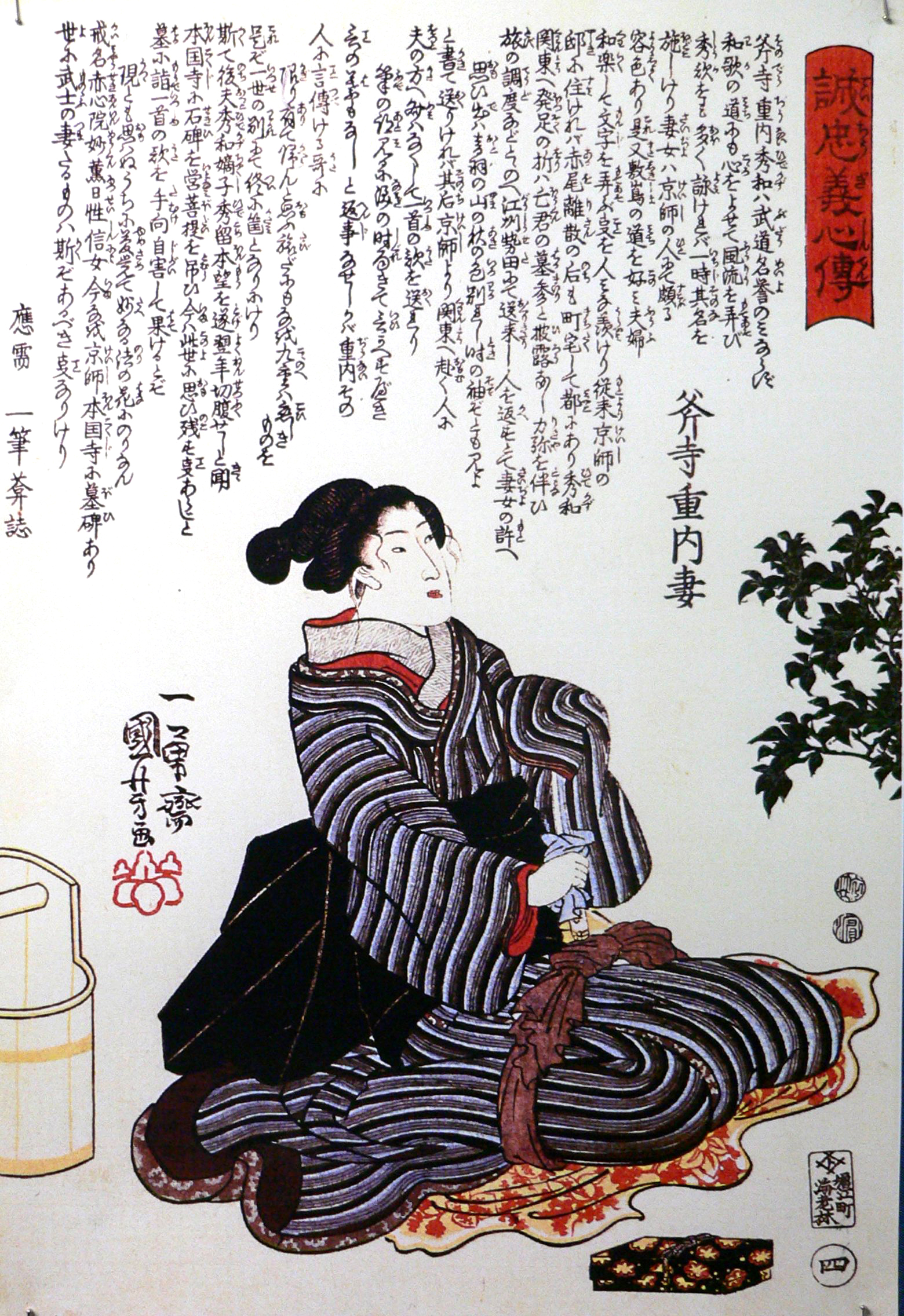
A woodblock print depicting the wife of Onodera Junai, one of the forty-seven rōnin. She prepares herself to follow her husband into death.

Junshi (殉死; "following the lord in death", sometimes translated as "suicide through fidelity") refers to the medieval Japanese act of vassals committing suicide upon the death of their lord.

== Background ==
The practice is described by Chinese chronicles, describing the inhabitants of the Japanese archipelago, going as far back as the third century, according to the Records of the Three Kingdoms, where more than a hundred servants were said to have followed Queen Himiko in death. The Nihon Shoki records a decree in 646 that forbade junshi, but it continued to be practiced for centuries afterward.

Under the Tokugawa shogunate (1603–1868), battle and war were almost unknown, and junshi became quite popular with vassals even when their masters died naturally or otherwise non-violently. There were no fixed rules for junshi, and to some extent it depended on the circumstances, the importance of the lord and the esteem in which he was held by his followers, and the manner of his death. Junshi could also be carried out irrespective of whether the lord had died of an illness, fallen on the battlefield, or committed seppuku.

== Examples ==
One example is the 1607 suicide of seven pages upon the deaths of Matsudaira Tadayoshi and Yūki Hideyasu. This occurred even at the highest levels of power on occasion. Tokugawa Hidetada was followed into death by one of his Elder Counselors (Rōjū), and in 1651, when Shōgun Tokugawa Iemitsu died, thirteen of his closest advisors (including two Rōjū) committed suicide, dramatically shifting the balance of the council, as a result of the political views of those who remained.

As a result of junshi being practiced so widely, it was outlawed by a number of daimyō. It was outlawed by the Saga clan in 1661, and then entirely in the version of the Buke Sho-Hatto (The Law for Military Houses) by the fourth Tokugawa Shōgun Ietsuna (1651–1680) in 1663; Junshi was seen by the bakufu to contain certain elements of sedition. The enforcement of this law was strict, and worked in the customary Japanese way by laying the blame for an instance of junshi on the son or successor of the deceased lord whose death had occasioned it. While showing loyalty to their dead lord by following him to death, retainers could at the same time seriously jeopardise the career of his successor, and quite possibly ruin his entire house through the confiscation by the authorities of the fief. The practice continued, however.

In 1668, when daimyō Okudaira Tadamasa died, one of his vassals committed suicide; by way of enforcement of the ban, the shōgunate killed the vassal's children, banished his other relatives, and removed Okudaira's successor to a different, smaller, fief (han). Continued instances like these led to a redeclaration of the ban in 1683. This sort of re-assertion of laws, as seen in many other Tokugawa bans on a myriad of other practices, indicates that the ban was not widely followed, nor effectively enforceable.

On another occasion, when Lord Tokugawa Tadakichi, the fourth son of Ieyasu, died in 1607, it was reported that five of his men chose death by junshi.

In 1634, when Lord Satake Yoshinobu was dying, an executive samurai of the lord's Edo residence admonished his vassals that the lord did not desire them to die after him even though,

...it is the fashion in contemporary society to cut one's belly after the death of the master. They consider such an action a meritorious deed. (Hiromichi.)

Despite Yoshinobu's dying wish, however, two samurai committed suicide after his death.

Likewise, when the famous daimyō warlord Date Masamune died in 1636, fifteen samurai committed seppuku. In this particular case, six of them were rear vassals whose masters decided to follow the lord even to death.

In 1657, when the Lord Nabeshima Katsushige died, twenty-six of his samurai committed suicide.

A late example is General Nogi Maresuke, hero of the Russo-Japanese War. As the Meiji emperor's funeral cortege was leaving the imperial palace in Tokyo, the country was jolted by the sensational news that Maresuke had committed suicide along with his wife. What made the news sensational was that Maresuke had disemboweled himself in the ancient samurai tradition of junshi to follow his lord in death. Carol Gluck wrote,

"On first hearing it did not seem possible that one of the best known figures in Meiji national life had committed junshi…. In a nation in the midst of a solemn celebration of its modernity, its foremost soldier…had followed a custom that had been outlawed by the Tokugawa shogunate as antiquated in 1663."

Inoue Tetsūjirō considered Maresuke's suicide as a cause for celebration, despite the fact that, from the vantage point of society, it meant a loss of a great man and sadness to many. He also added that Maresuke's junshi,

"…demonstrated the power of bushidō and speculated that the suicide would exert an extraordinary impact on Japan."

Various thinkers also regarded it as a signal act of loyalty, and an example to the Japanese in the collapse of traditional morals. Others decried it, Kiryu Yuyu explicitly criticizing it in light of calls to revive bushido.

Junshi was also considered by the Akō rōnin had they failed in their mission to kill Kira Yoshinaka. Between 1701 and 1703, the so-called Akō Affair furnished how bushidō should be judged. In 1701, the daimyō of Akō, Asano (Takumi-no-kami) Naganori, attacked the Master of Ceremonies (Kōke) at the shōgunal court, Kira (Kōzuke-no-suke) Yoshinaka, drawing his sword in one of the corridors of Edo Castle, residence of Tsunayoshi, the fifth Tokugawa shōgun. The exact circumstances leading to Asano's action have never been known, but Asano claimed to have been insulted by Kira. An explanation agreed upon by most commentators of the affair is that Kira had been expecting a douceur (bribe) from Asano, and that Kira deliberately gave false or misleading instructions concerning a ceremony over which Asano had to preside when the bribe was not forthcoming. Kira received two cuts, neither of them fatal, and Asano was arrested, sentenced to death through seppuku, and carried out his sentence on the day of the attack. When the news reached the fief of Akō Asano his retainers discussed what action to take. The bakufu requested the immediate surrender of the fief, and some of the retainers wished to oppose this by barricading themselves in Akō Castle, an action known as rōjō, while others wanted to follow their lord in death by means of junshi, this action being called oibara. They were shocked and angered by the fact that Kira was not only still alive but also not punished. One man, Ōishi (Kura-no-suke) Yoshino, took a leading role from the beginning. He was in favor of oibara, but first sent a petition to the bakufu, requesting that the fief be transferred to Asano's younger brother, Asano Nagahiro, titled Daigaku. Before this petition reached the authorities, however, bakufu officials arrived at Akō and the fief was surrendered. Ōishi repeated his request for the appointment of Asano Daigaku as the new daimyō of Akō, and while the bakufu deliberated, the Akō samurai could take no action for fear of compromising Asano Daigaku. After more than a year, the bakufu decided to confiscate the fief, a move which formally reduced the Akō retainers to the status of rōnin. Ōishi and the men who had previously joined his oibara plan now decided to avenge their dead lord by killing Kira. Had their mission failed, the Akō rōnin had resolved to commit junshi together. A violation of the prohibition against junshi would have resulted in the successor of the deceased lord being considered incompetent, and could lead to the confiscation of his fief. Thus, they would have committed two criminal offences.

== See also ==
- Altruistic suicide
- Human sacrifice
- Kiten, Count Nogi, who committed junshi along with his wife after the death of Emperor Meiji in 1912.
- Sati (practice), the now-outlawed practice of Hindu widows throwing themselves over their husbands' funeral pyres
- Self sacrifice
- Shinjū – double love suicides were sometimes called junshi in order to lend them a more honorable appearance
- Sokushinbutsu
