= Ghost Dog: The Way of the Samurai =

1999 film by Jim Jarmusch

- Theatrical release poster
- Directed by: Jim Jarmusch
- Written by: Jim Jarmusch
- Produced by: Richard Guay; Jim Jarmusch
- Starring: Forest Whitaker; John Tormey; Cliff Gorman; Henry Silva; Isaach De Bankolé; Tricia Vessey; Victor Argo; Gene Ruffini; Richard Portnow; Camille Winbush
- Cinematography: Robby Müller
- Edited by: Jay Rabinowitz
- Music by: RZA
- Production companies: Pandora Film; ARD; Degeto Film; Plywood Productions; BAC Films; Le Studio Canal+; JVC
- Distributed by: Artisan Entertainment (United States); BAC Films (France); Arthaus (Germany); France Eigasha (Japan)
- Release dates: May 19, 1999 (Cannes); October 6, 1999 (France); November 27, 1999 (Japan); January 6, 2000 (Germany); March 3, 2000 (US)
- Running time: 116 minutes
- Countries: United States; France; Germany; Japan
- Languages: English; French
- Budget: $2 million
- Box office: $9.3 million

Ghost Dog: The Way of the Samurai is a 1999 crime drama film produced, written and directed by Jim Jarmusch. It stars Forest Whitaker as the title character, a hitman for the mafia who adheres to the ancient warrior code of the samurai, as outlined in the book of Yamamoto Tsunetomo's recorded sayings, Hagakure. The cast also features Cliff Gorman, Henry Silva, Isaach de Bankolé, Victor Argo and Camille Winbush. The film also features RZA in his film debut.

An international co-production between the United States, France, Germany and Japan, Ghost Dog premiered at the 1999 Cannes Film Festival, where it competed for the Palme d'Or. The film opened to largely positive critical reception, and was nominated for both an Independent Spirit Award for Best Feature and a César Award for Best Foreign Film.

== Plot ==
Ghost Dog sees himself as a retainer of Louie, a local mobster, who saved Ghost Dog's life years earlier. While living as a hitman for the American Mafia, he adheres to the code of the samurai, and interprets and applies the wisdom of the Hagakure.

Louie tells Ghost Dog to kill a gangster, Handsome Frank, who is sleeping with the daughter of local mafia boss Vargo. Ghost Dog arrives and kills the gangster, before seeing that the girl is also in the room; he leaves her alive, and she gives him a copy of the book Rashōmon to read. To avoid being implicated in the murder of a made man, Vargo and his associate Sonny Valerio decide to get rid of Ghost Dog. Louie knows practically nothing about Ghost Dog, as the hitman communicates only by homing pigeon. The mobsters start by tracing all the pigeon coops in town. They find Ghost Dog's cabin atop a building and kill his pigeons. Ghost Dog realizes he must kill Vargo and his men or they will kill him and his master.

During the day, Ghost Dog frequently visits the park to see his best friend, a French-speaking ice cream man named Raymond. Ghost Dog does not understand French and Raymond does not understand English but the two nonetheless seem to connect with each other. Ghost Dog also befriends a little girl named Pearline, to whom he lends the book Rashōmon.

Eventually, Ghost Dog invades Vargo's mansion and kills almost everyone single-handedly, sparing only Louie and Vargo's daughter. That night, Ghost Dog kills Sonny Valerio at his home by shooting him through a pipe. Ghost Dog expects that Louie will attack him, as he feels that Louie is obliged to avenge the murder of his boss Vargo. He goes to the park and gives Raymond all his money, helping him to stay in the country. Pearline appears and gives back Rashōmon to Ghost Dog, saying that she liked it. Ghost Dog gives Pearline his copy of Hagakure and encourages her to read it.

Though Louie feels some loyalty to Ghost Dog, he finally confronts him at Raymond's ice cream stand with Raymond and Pearline watching. Ghost Dog is unwilling to attack his master and allows Louie to kill him. His last act is to give Louie the copy of Rashōmon and encourage him to read it. Pearline takes Ghost Dog's empty gun and aims at Louie as he flees. Ghost Dog dies from his wounds, lying on the asphalt. Raymond weeps while Pearline watches Louie leave; Louie gets into a car with Vargo's daughter (who now has replaced her father as his boss). Later, Pearline reads the Hagakure.

== Cast ==
- Forest Whitaker as "Ghost Dog"
  - Damon Whitaker as Younger "Ghost Dog"
- Henry Silva as Ray Vargo
- Cliff Gorman as Sonny Valerio
- Isaach de Bankolé as Raymond
- John Tormey as Louie Bonacelli
- Camille Winbush as Pearline
- Tricia Vessey as Louise Vargo
- Richard Portnow as Frank "Handsome Frank"
- Victor Argo as Vinny
- Gene Ruffini as Old Consigliere
- Vinny Vella as Sammy "The Snake"
- Joseph Rigano as Joe "Rags"
- Frank Minucci as Angelo "Big Angie"
- Vince Viverito as Johnny Morini
- Frank Adonis as Valerio's Bodyguard
- RZA as "Samurai In Camouflage"
- Gary Farmer as "Nobody"
- Shi Yan Ming as Kung-Fu Master
- Vanessa Hollingshead as Sheriff's Deputy
- Timbo King as "MC In Blue"
- Jamie Hector as "Gangsta In Red"

== Themes and analysis ==
=== Violence and cross-culturalism ===
In a 2000 interview with Peter Bowen of Filmmaker, Jarmusch referred to the violence in Ghost Dog: The Way of the Samurai as "simply a reflection of the history of human beings." Regarding the multiple instances in which the gangster characters or their associates watch cartoons, Jarmusch added: "As for the cartoons, it is another layer, resonance, or nuance of things. They are echoes of things happening in the story. What I don't like is that some people have said that the cartoons are there because the gangsters are very cartoon-like. I just like cartoons, and I like the idea of adults watching cartoons." Bowen noted that the film features clips from The Itchy & Scratchy Show, a fictional television series in The Simpsons known for its gratuitous violence.

Speaking on Ghost Dog as a character, Jarmusch said that, "Violence is just who Ghost Dog is. He is a warrior, and he follows a warrior code. He acts in violent situations, as a warrior must." Whitaker, in the same interview, added, "To be whole, to have duality and knowing both sides of everything—I think Ghost Dog is aware of that, at least as a character. He is not content, but strong in what he knows to be the order of his life. I don't think he even views what he does as a violent act; it is just an extension of something he must do to maintain the order by which he lives." Jarmusch goes on to say that violence is one of several elements in the film representative of an amalgam of cultures, stating, "America is about the synthesis of a lot of different cultures, and beauty arises out of that synthesis. I don't see this as violence of about cultures clashing but rather as being all part of one thing. The Italian guys don't even work out of an Italian restaurant anymore; it's a Chinese restaurant. Ghost Dog himself is an urban black character, but he follows a code from another culture and another century, the Japanese samurai culture."

=== Cinematic allusions ===
Ghost Dog: The Way of the Samurai has been interpreted by critics as a homage to Le Samouraï, a 1967 crime-drama by Jean-Pierre Melville starring Alain Delon. That movie opens with a quote from an invented Book of Bushido and features a meditative, loner hero, Jef Costello. In the same manner that Ghost Dog has an electronic "key" to break into luxury cars, Costello has a huge ring of keys that enable him to steal any Citroën DS. The endings share a key similarity. The peculiar relationship between the protagonists of both movies and birds, as companions and danger advisers, is another common theme. The film contains a number of references to Seijun Suzuki's Branded to Kill, such as when a bird lands in front of Ghost Dog's rifle scope (referencing the incident with a butterfly in Suzuki's film) and Ghost Dog shooting Sonny Valerio up the drain pipe. Both Melville and Suzuki receive "personal thanks" in the film's credits.

== Production ==
Ghost Dog: The Way of the Samurai was shot mostly in Jersey City, New Jersey, but the movie never mentions where the story is set. License plates reveal it is in "The Industrial State" and a vehicle from another state has on its license plate "The Highway State", both of which are fictional state nicknames.

The Holland Tunnel appears in a driving scene, however, the shot begins after the large sign at the toll plaza in Jersey City.

== Soundtrack ==
The film's score and soundtrack is the first produced by the Wu-Tang Clan's RZA.

US and Japanese versions of the soundtrack album have been released, each with a different set of tracks. The Japanese release also has some songs not in the film. Songs in the film that don't appear on either soundtrack album include From Then Till Now performed by Killah Priest, Armagideon Time performed by Willi Williams, Nuba One performed by Andrew Cyrille and Jimmy Lyons and Cold Lampin With Flavor performed by Public Enemy.

== Reception ==
=== Box office ===
Ghost Dog: The Way of the Samurai grossed a worldwide total of $9,380,473, of which $3,308,029 was in the United States.

=== Critical response ===
Critical response to the film was largely positive. On the Rotten Tomatoes review site, the film has an 84% rating, based on reviews from 106 critics. The website's critical consensus was that the movie is "[a]n innovative blend of samurai and gangster lifestyles." On Metacritic, the film has a score of 68 based on 31 critics' reviews.

Roger Ebert of the Chicago Sun-Times gave the film three out of four, describing it as "truly, profoundly weird". Ebert's review proposed Ghost Dog made the most sense if Whitaker's character were insane. "In a quiet, sweet way, he is totally unhinged and has lost all touch with reality. His profound sadness, which permeates the touching Whitaker performance, comes from his alienation from human society, his loneliness, his attempt to justify inhuman behavior (murder) with a belief system (the samurai code) that has no connection with his life or his world." J. Hoberman of The Village Voice described it as "an impeccably shot and sensationally scored deadpan parody of two current popular modes", namely hitman and mafia films.

=== Accolades ===
The film was nominated for the Grand Prix of the Belgian Syndicate of Cinema Critics, the César Award for Best Foreign Film of 2000 and the Palme d'Or award at the 1999 Cannes Film Festival. It was also nominated for Best Feature at the 16th Independent Spirit Awards.

== Home media ==
Ghost Dog was released on VHS and DVD following its theatrical release. It was released on Blu-ray by The Criterion Collection in December 2020. It was released on Ultra HD Blu-ray by StudioCanal in the United Kingdom in October 2023.
