= Siege of Yanagawa =

1600 siege during Japan's Sengoku period

- Part of the Sengoku period
Date	1600
Location	Yanagawa castle, Chikugo Province, Kyūshū 33°09′39″N 130°24′04″E
Result	Tokugawa victory

Belligerents
Eastern army; Forces loyal to Tokugawa Ieyasu	Western army; Tachibana clan Castle garrison

Commanders and leaders
Katō Kiyomasa; Kuroda Yoshitaka; Nabeshima Naoshige	Tachibana Muneshige; Tachibana Ginchiyo
- Location within Fukuoka Prefecture Siege of Yanagawa (Japan)

The 1600 siege of Yanagawa took place just after the decisive battle of Sekigahara in which Tokugawa Ieyasu secured his control over Japan.

== History ==
Tachibana Ginchiyo and Tachibana Muneshige remained one of the chief opponents to Tokugawa on Kyūshū, and was besieged in his castle at Yanagawa by Katō Kiyomasa, Kuroda Yoshitaka and Nabeshima Naoshige.

Muneshige surrendered under the assumption that he could then switch sides and aid the Tokugawa-loyal forces against the Shimazu clan of Satsuma, but Ieyasu forbade this plan from going through.
