= Nabeshima Naomasa =

Japanese feudal lord (1815–1871)

- 鍋島 直正
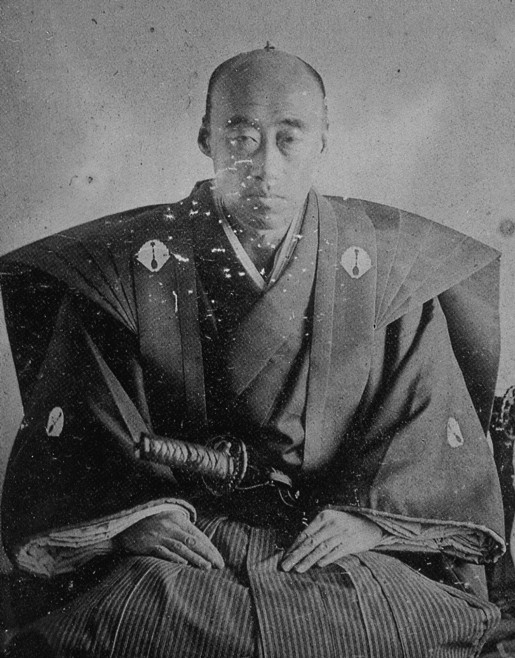
- Naomasa in 1859

Lord of Saga
- In office 1830–1861
- Preceded by: Nabeshima Narinao
- Succeeded by: Nabeshima Naohiro

Personal details
- Born: January 16, 1815
- Died: March 8, 1871 (aged 56) Tokyo

Nabeshima Naomasa (鍋島 直正; January 16, 1815 – March 8, 1871) was the 10th and final daimyō of Saga Domain in Hizen Province, Kyūshū, Japan. His honorary title was Hizen-no-Kami, and he was occasionally referred to as “Prince Hizen” in Western accounts during the Bakumatsu period.

== Biography ==
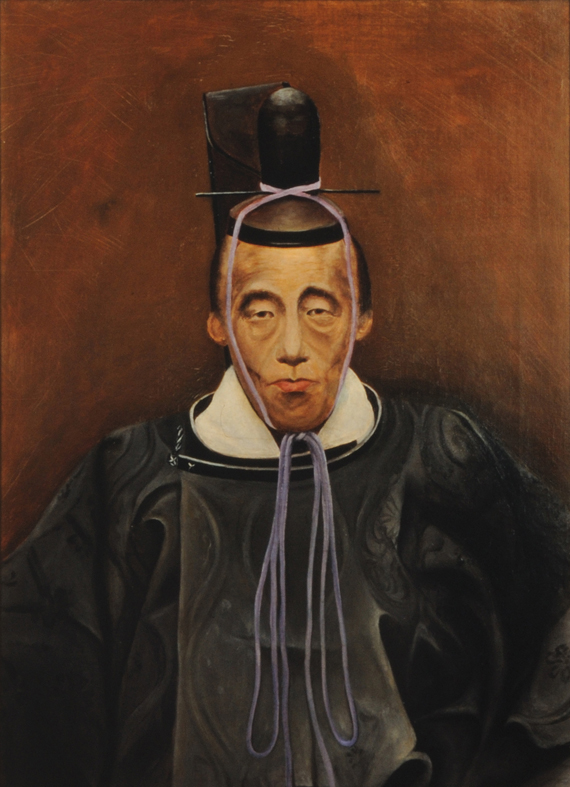
Portrait of Nabeshima Naomasa in his later years. By Kaneyuki Hyakutake, 1884.

Naomasa was born the 17th son of Nabeshima Narinao, the 9th daimyō of Saga Domain. His mother was a daughter of Ikeda Harumichi. His wife was the 18th daughter of shōgun Tokugawa Ienari, and one of his concubines was the 19th daughter of Tokugawa Narimasa.

On the retirement of his father in 1830, Naomasa was appointed 10th daimyō of Saga at the age of 17. In celebration of his new role and to reinforce the close relations between the Saga domain and the shogunate, his father-in-law, Shōgun Tokugawa Ienari, allowed him the use of one character from his name. Thus, "Narimasa" (斉正) was written until the end of the Edo period.

Naomasa inherited a domain on the verge of bankruptcy due to high expenses associated with its role in guarding the foreign settlement at nearby Dejima and due to the profligate spending habits of Naomasa’s father. When Naomasa was appointed daimyō in Edo and prepared to make a journey back to his domain, a mob of creditors besieged his Edo residence demanding repayment on outstanding debts before he departed the city. However, Naomasa’s attempts to reform domain finances were continually blocked by his retired father, whose conservative politics and resistance to innovation were at odds with any new policies he attempted to implement. Naomasa was only able to take full control after the 1835 fire at Saga Castle.

Using the need to raise funds to reconstruct the castle as a justification, he cut the number of samurai supported by the Saga domain to one-fifth of its previous level and established a number of industries, including the production of weapons, charcoal, and tea as domain monopolies. At the same time, he made a strong investment in the domain academy, the Kodokan (弘道館) to train future leaders of Saga Domain in the latest technologies. Through his contacts at nearby Nagasaki, he imported Armstrong cannon, far more powerful than anything deployed by the Tokugawa shogunate to date, and had the weapons reverse engineered with copies made by Saga armories. He built the first reverberatory furnace in Japan and invited competent artisans, including swordsmiths and metal casters, from around Japan to migrate to Saga regardless of their social standing. He also sponsored the development of steam engines and steam-powered warships.

In 1853, with the arrival of Commodore Matthew Perry to end Japan’s national isolation policy, he was initially vocal in his support of the Sonnō jōi faction, and assisted the Tokugawa government in building coastal defense batteries around Edo Bay. However, he also secretly opened direct negotiations with Great Britain, and later emerged as a proponent of opening the country to foreign trade. He officially retired from the position of daimyō in 1861. Even after retirement, he kept an active hand in the development of Saga Domain, strongly supporting rangaku studies, especially in the fields of western medicine, weaponry and military tactics. He introduced smallpox vaccination into Japan, experimenting first on his own son. In the unsettled Bakumatsu period, Saga emerged as one of the militarily strongest of the Japanese domains, and Naomasa attempted to maintain a policy of neutrality between the moderate Kōbu Gattai faction which wished to reconcile the Tokugawa shogunate with the Imperial Court, and the more radical factions supporting either the Emperor or the Shōgun.

During the Boshin War of the Meiji Restoration, he joined his forces with the Satchō Alliance in support of Emperor Meiji. After the Battle of Toba–Fushimi he fought against the Tokugawa remnants at the Battle of Ueno and in the various campaigns in northern Japan against the Ōuetsu Reppan Dōmei.

Naomasa was appointed a councilor to the new Meiji government. With the abolition of the han system, he surrendered his office and was appointed governor until Saga Domain was absorbed into the new Saga Prefecture in July 1871. Together with Shimazu Yoshitake, he was appointed Commissioner of Colonial Affairs, and tasked with the settlement of Ezo and other lands in northern Japan.

He died in 1871 at the Saga domain residence in Tokyo.

Some of Naomasa's physical legacies include Saga Castle, which is being actively renovated, and a reconstruction of his Kakurin-tei (郭林亭) Japanese tea house located in the grounds of Kōno Park, Saga City, Japan. The new museum at Saga Castle provides excellent information on Naomasa's life and accomplishments.

Preceded by Nabeshima Narinao	10th Daimyō of Saga; 1830-1861	Succeeded by Nabeshima Naohiro
