= Shima Yoshitake =

Japanese samurai, chamberlain and governor

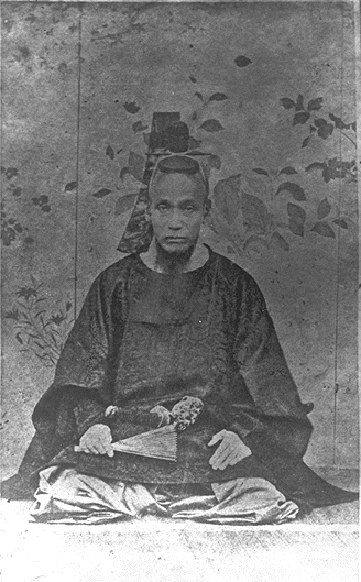
Shima Yoshitake

Shima Yoshitake (島 義勇; October 26, 1822 – April 13, 1874) was a samurai from Saga domain. He later became a chamberlain and later a governor for Akita Prefecture.
