= Hagakure =

Guide for samurai life by Yamamoto Tsunetomo

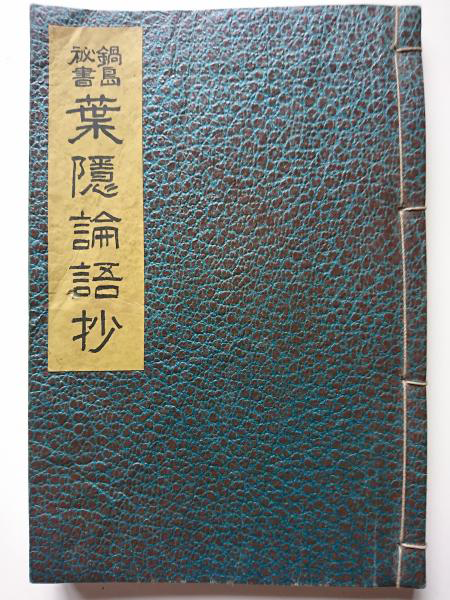
Prohibited book of Nabeshima, Hagakure The Analects (abridged). 1939 edition.

Cover of The Book of the Samurai

Hagakure (Kyūjitai: 葉隱; Shinjitai: 葉隠; IPA: [haɡakɯɾe]; meaning Hidden by the Leaves / Hidden Leaves), or Hagakure Kikigaki (葉隠聞書), is a practical and spiritual guide for a warrior, drawn from a collection of commentaries by the clerk Yamamoto Tsunetomo, former retainer to Nabeshima Mitsushige (July 10, 1632 – July 2, 1700), the third lord of Saga Domain in Japan. Tashiro Tsuramoto compiled these commentaries from his conversations with Tsunetomo from 1709 to 1716; however, it was not published until many years afterwards. Hagakure is also known as The Book of the Samurai, Analects of Nabeshima or Hagakure Analects.

== Content ==
The book records Yamamoto's views on bushido, the warrior code of the samurai.

Hagakure is sometimes said to assert that bushido is really the "Way of Dying" or living as though one was already dead, and that a samurai must be willing to die at any moment in order to be true to his lady/lord. His saying "the way of the warrior is death" was a summation of the willingness to sacrifice that bushido codified.

Hagakure's text is occasionally misinterpreted as meaning that bushido is a code of death. However, the true meaning is that by having a constant awareness of death, people can achieve a transcendent state of freedom, whereby "it is possible to perfectly fulfill one's calling as a warrior."

== Historical context ==
After the Tokugawa shogunate suppressed the Shimabara Rebellion in 1638, Japan experienced no warfare for about two centuries. Private feuding and dueling between samurai was also suppressed.

Yamamoto Tsunetomo was born in 1659, after the end of officially sanctioned samurai fighting. He had no personal combat experience and when he was employed, he worked as a scribe.

By the late 1600s and early 1700s, samurai faced the dilemma of maintaining a warrior class in the absence of war, and Hagakure reflects this uncertainty. Written late in the author's life, the book also reflects his nostalgia for a world that had disappeared before his birth.

== Reception ==
Hagakure was largely forgotten for two centuries. The first modern edition appeared in 1900, and it did not receive much attention during the first decades of the century. Hagakure came to be viewed as a definitive book of the samurai for the armed forces of the Empire of Japan only during the Pacific War.

According to Mark Ravina,

Rather than an account of samurai tradition, this work serves as an example of what the Japanese army thought Japanese soldiers should believe about samurai practice.

In the post-war era, the nationalist author and poet, Yukio Mishima, was inspired by Hagakure and wrote his own book in praise of the work. Quotations from Hagakure are used as a narrative device in the 1999 American gangster film Ghost Dog: The Way of the Samurai.

== Translations ==
- Hagakure, The Way of the Samurai, Yamamoto Tsunetomo, Translated by Takao Mukoh, Angkor Verlag, 2000 (Reprint), ISBN 3-8311-1530-3
- Bushido, The Way of the Samurai, Yamamoto Tsunetomo, Translated by Justin F. Stone and Minoru Tanaka, Square One Publishers, 2003, ISBN 0-7570-0026-6
- The Art of the Samurai: Yamamoto Tsunetomo's Hagakure, Yamamoto Tsunetomo, Translated by Barry D. Steben, Duncan Baird, September 2008, ISBN 1-84483-720-3 (Partial translation)
- Hagakure, The manga edition, Yamamoto Tsunetomo, Translated by William Scott Wilson, a comic book/manga version, adapted by Sean Michael Wilson and Chie Kutsuwada, Kondansha International Ltd., 2011, ISBN 978-4-7700-3120-4
- Hagakure: The Secret Wisdom of the Samurai, Yamamoto Tsunetomo, Translated by Alexander Bennett, Tuttle Publishing, 2014, ISBN 978-4-8053-1198-1 (Complete translation of Books 1-2, partial translation of books 3-11)
- Hagakure: The Way of the Samurai, Yamamoto Tsunetomo, Translated by Jake Ganor, Imperium Press, 2024, ISBN 978-1-9231-0423-5 (Complete verse translation of Books 1-2, partial translation of books 3-11)
