= Saga Domain =

Japanese historical estate in Hizen province

Saga Domain 佐賀藩
- Domain of Japan
- 1590–1871
- Flag Mon of the Nabeshima clan

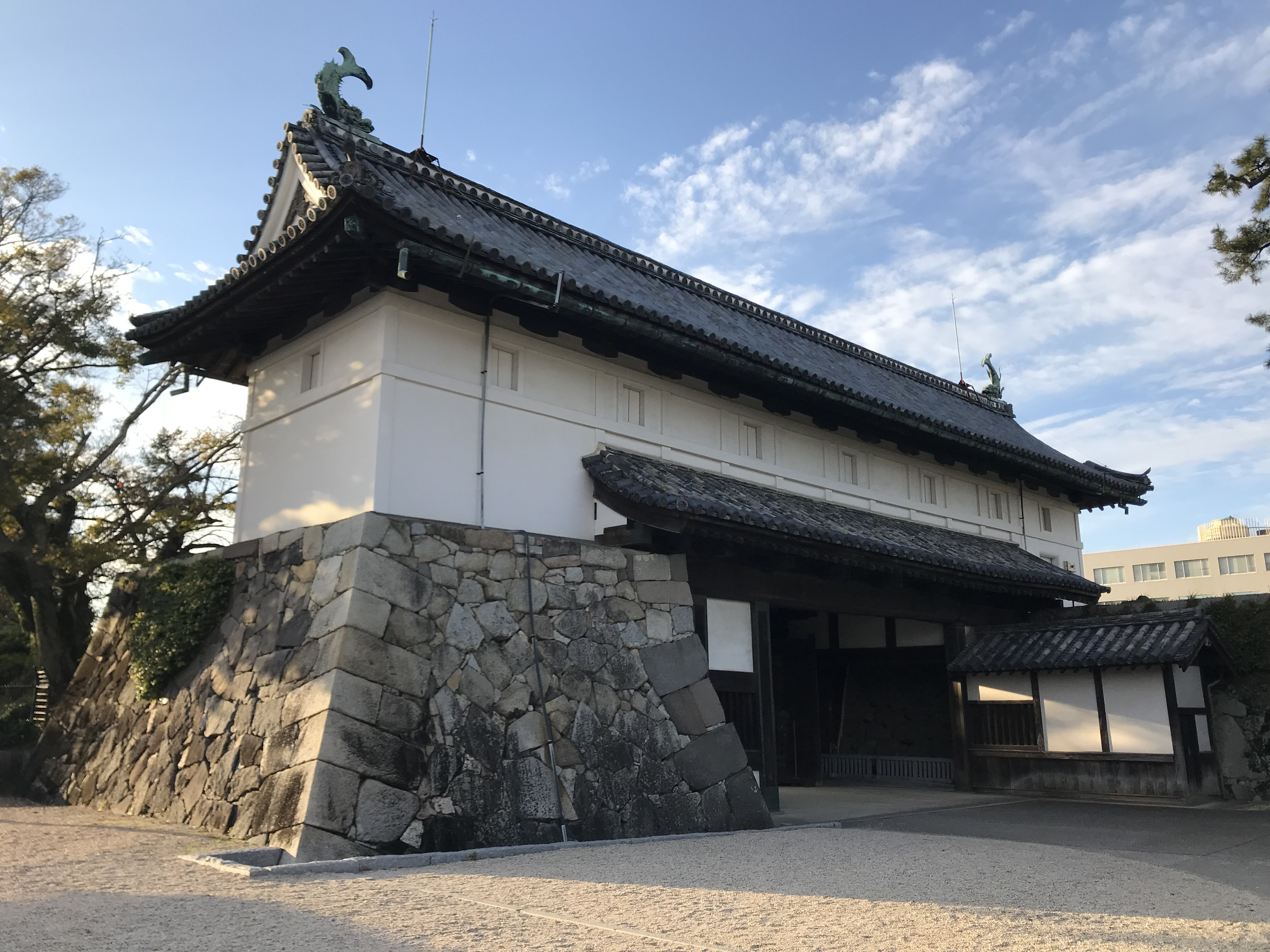
- A surviving gate of Saga Castle
- Capital: Saga Castle
- Government
  - Type: Daimyō
- Daimyō
  - 1607-1657: Nabeshima Katsushige (first)
  - 1861-1871: Nabeshima Naohiro (Saga) (last)
- Historical era: Edo period
  - Established: 1590
  - Disestablished: 1871
- Today part of: Saga Prefecture
- Location of Saga Castle Saga Domain (Japan)

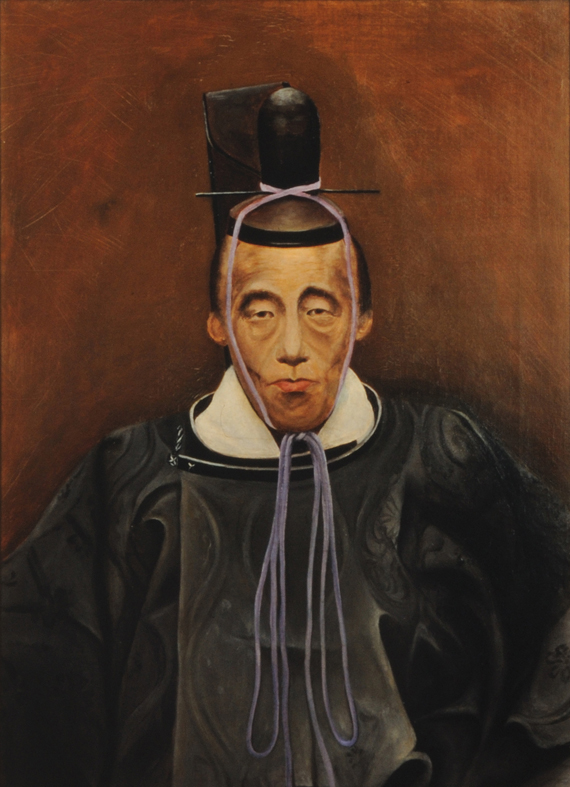
Nabeshima Naomasa, the daimyo of the Saga Domain (1830–1861).

Saga Domain (佐賀藩, Saga-han) was a Japanese domain of the Edo period Tokugawa Shogunate. It encompassed most of what are now Saga and Nagasaki Prefectures and was ruled from Saga Castle in what is now the urban center of the city of Saga. It was ruled through its history by the tozama daimyō Nabeshima clan. The domain was also referred to as Hizen Domain (肥前藩) after its location in Hizen Province or Nabeshima Domain (鍋島藩) after its ruling clan. The domain played a significant role in the Meiji Restoration.

Though the Dutch and Chinese trading posts in Nagasaki were overseen directly by officials of the Tokugawa shogunate, the domain was largely responsible for the military defense of the city and the port.

== History ==
The Nabeshima clan were originally vassals of the Ryūzōji clan who controlled northern Kyushu in the Muromachi period. However, Ryūzōji Takanobu was killed in the Battle of Okitanawate with the Shimazu and Arima clans in 1584, and Nabeshima Naoshige became the guardian of Takanobu's young heir, Ryūzōji Takafusa. Six years later, Toyotomi Hideyoshi granted approval for Nabeshima to overthrow Ryūzōji and seize the territory for his own lineage. Nabeshima supported Hideyoshi's invasions of Korea in the 1590s, and fought in the Western Army, against the Tokugawa clan in the Battle of Sekigahara in 1600. During this battle, however, he turned against and captured Western Army general Tachibana Muneshige, earning some degree of favor from Tokugawa Ieyasu and being allowed to keep his fief.

=== Edo period ===
The Nabeshima were allotted a kokudaka of 357,000 koku, which remained constant throughout the Tokugawa period. The Tokugawa shogunate granted the Nabeshima the ceremonial use of the "Matsudaira" surname and one kanji from the shogun's given name to all the successive daimyō, starting with Katsushige's eldest son, Nabeshima Tadanao. The domain's location close to Korea and far from Edo, the shogunal capital, along with its trade connections, brought significant foreign influence to the area. The area was a center for ceramic production and techniques as a result of its connections with Korea, becoming famous for its Imari porcelain which was a significant export good to Europe. However, although the nominal kokudaka of the domain was 357,000 koku, the actual kokudaka of the daimyō was only 60,000 koku, as the Nabeshima clan had established three sub-domains headed by cadet branches of the clan as insurance to ensure succession: Hasunoike Domain, Ogi Domain and Kashima Domain. In additional, large hatamoto stipends were granted to four branch families of Nabeshima (Shiraishi, Kawakubo, Murata, Kubota), and four branch families of the Ryūzōji (Taku, Takeo, Isahaya, Suko).

Remnants of the Ryūzōji continued to surface from time to time, however, and occasionally threatened the Nabeshima grip on power. Although members of the Ryūzōji clan ofter held high positions in domain affairs, efforts by the Ryūzōji to obtain a restoration of their status as an independent domain were denied the shogunate.

The area also bore a considerable Kirishitan population, which erupted in protest in the famous Shimabara Rebellion (1637–38).

Because the Saga Domain was close to Nagasaki, in 1631, the Shogunate ordered the domain to take turns providing troops to guard Nagasaki, exchanging on a yearly basis with Fukuoka Domain. In exchange, the domain was granted a reduction in its sankin kotai obligation, reducing the required attendance in Edo to about three months out of two years, instead of the usual two years. This was still a considerable expense, and at times the domain sought to lessen its losses by reducing the number of samurai it sent to defend the port. In 1808, during the Napoleonic Wars, the Phaeton incident occurred, in which a British frigate invaded Nagasaki and demanded the handover of the Dutch trading post. However, as Saga Domain had reduced its security personnel without permission (only 100 Saga samurai were present to deal with the situation, rather than the obligatory one thousand), the shogunate was forced to submit to the demands of the British ship, and scolded Saga harshly for its failure to fulfill its obligations. The situation surrounding the domain worsened with the death toll of the Siebold typhoon in 1828, which killed nearly 10,000 people, and the domain's finances on the brink of collapse.

=== Around the Open Bay and the end of Shogunate ===
The 10th daimyō, Nabeshima Naomasa (Kansō) to be informed about the Opium Wars in China, visited the Dutch warship Palembang and reaffirmed the need for Western military technology. He decided to reform the domain's administration and to adopt Western technology. In particular, he carried out extensive restructuring, reducing the number of officials by two-fifths, and devoted himself to protecting and nurturing farmers, as well as to developing and trading in industries such as pottery, tea, and coal, which improved the domain's finances. He also established organizations for the research of Western technologies, including steel refining, steam engines and artillery, and turned the domain's efforts towards these pursuits, making it one of the most modern domains in this period. Saga thus began constructing operations for the first Japanese iron refinery in 1849, and made the first use of reverberatory furnaces three years later at Tafuse by the Saga Castle in 1852. Then the domain set up Seirenkata (精煉方), the research institute for industrial technology on the site.

In 1853, Russian Admiral Yevfimy Putyatin arrived in Nagasaki harbor, and provided the first demonstration of a steam locomotive to the Japanese. Ishiguro Hirotsugu, Nakamura Kisuke, and Tanaka Hisashige were among the first Japanese engineers, who attempted to manufacture their own steam locomotives and steamships. They built up the second reverberatory furnace.

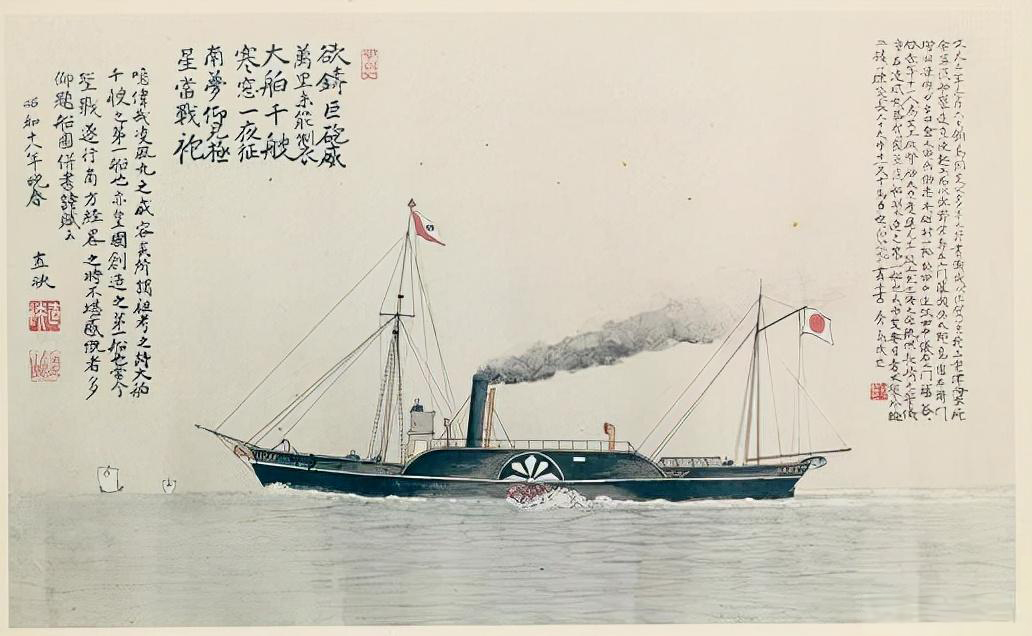
The 1943 painting of the Ryōfūmaru noted by Naomitsu Nabeshima, the grand-children of Naomasa.

When the shogunate relaxed the restrictions on the construction of large ships, an order was placed with the Dutch. Saga saw the revitalization of Japan's shipbuilding industry, and the launching of the first Japanese steamship, the Ryōfūmaru. The Nagasaki Naval Training Center was established in 1855, its first students coming from Saga. Then it created the Mietsu Naval Dock in 1858 on the inlet of the north of the Ariake Sea. (Note: Later in 2015 Mietsu Naval Dock was registered as a World Heritage Site.)

By 1866, the incorporation of British Armstrong Whitworth cannon made the ships at Nagasaki into the first Japanese Western-style ("modern") navy. The defense batteries at Shinagawa were also supplied by cannon from Saga. The domain also exhibited at the Exposition Universelle (1867) in Paris. Largely responsible for Japan's technological and military advancement, and holding much of the fruits of those labors, Saga attracted the attention of the shogunate, which kept a close eye on the domain. Saga refused to take a clear stance on the political situation and prohibited its samurai from interacting with samurai from other domains. However, in late 1867, it chose to side with Tosa, Satsuma, and Chōshū against the shogunate.

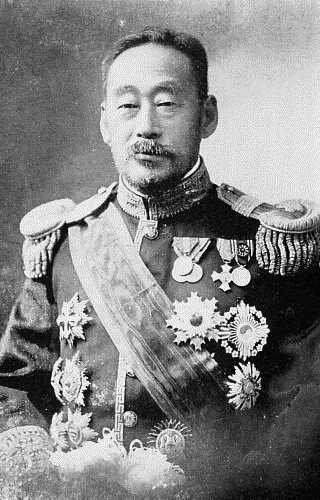
Nabeshima Naohiro (Saga), the last daimyo of Saga Domain

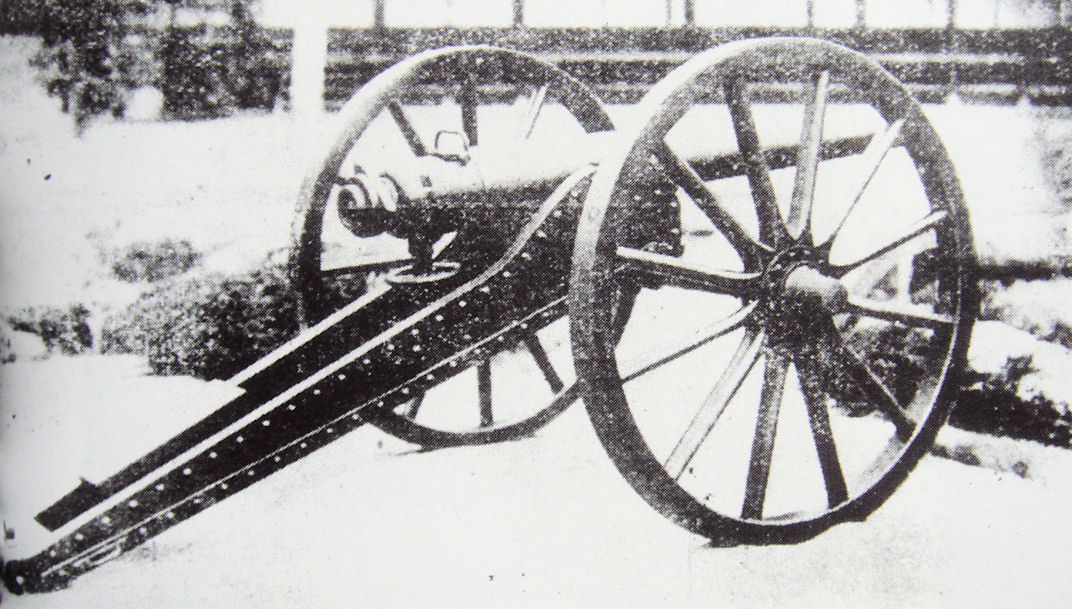
Armstrong gun used by troops of the Saga Domain at the Battle of Ueno against the Shogunate's Shōgitai.

In the Boshin War, Saga was assigned the vanguard of the forces advancing northward on the Hokuriku highway, and samurai from the domain fought the shogunate at the Battle of Ueno and in other clashes. As a result, the new Meiji government which emerged afterwards featured a number of figures from Saga, including Etō Shinpei, Ōkuma Shigenobu, Ōki Takatō, and Sano Tsunetami.

The feudal domains were abolished in 1871, and the Nabeshima clan given the title "marquis" (kōshaku) under the new kazoku peerage system. The territory of the domain was split between Saga and Nagasaki Prefectures.

Disgruntled former samurai of the domain, disillusioned with the Meiji government over the disputes over invading Korea and their loss of status and stipends, launched the Saga Rebellion in 1874, which was quickly suppressed.

== Holdings at the end of the Edo period ==
As with most domains in the han system, Saga Domain consisted of several discontinuous territories calculated to provide the assigned kokudaka, based on periodic cadastral surveys and projected agricultural yields.

- Hizen Province
  - 11 villages in Mine District
  - 92 villages in Saga District
  - 39 villages in Kanzaki District
  - 10 villages in Yabu District
  - 22 villages in Ogi District
  - 50 villages in Kishima District
  - 18 villages in Fujitsu District
  - 36 villages in Matsura District
  - 6 villages in Sonogi District
  - 39 villages in Takaki District

== List of daimyō ==
	Name	Tenure	Courtesy title	Court Rank	Kokudaka
Ryūzōji clan, 1590–1607 (Tozama daimyo)
1	Ryūzōji Takafusa (龍造寺高房)	1590–1607	Suruga no kami (駿河守)	Junior 5th Rank Lower Grade (従五位下)	357,000 koku
Nabeshima clan, 1609–1871 (Tozama daimyo)
1	Nabeshima Katsushige (鍋島 勝茂)	1607–1657	Shinano no kami (信濃守)	Junior 4th Rank Lower Grade (従五位下)	357,000 koku
2	Nabeshima Mitsushige (鍋島 光茂)	1657–1695	Tango no kami (丹後守)	Junior 4th Rank Lower Grade (従五位下)	357,000 koku
3	Nabeshima Tsunashige (鍋島 綱茂)	1695–1706	Shinano no kami (信濃守)	Junior 4th Rank Lower Grade (従五位下)	357,000 koku
4	Nabeshima Yoshishige (鍋島 吉茂)	1707–1730	Tango no kami (丹後守)	Junior 4th Rank Lower Grade (従五位下)	357,000 koku
5	Nabeshima Muneshige (鍋島 宗茂)	1730–1738	Shinano no kami, Hida no kami (信濃守、飛騨守)	Junior 4th Rank Lower Grade (従五位下)	357,000 koku
6	Nabeshima Munenori (鍋島 宗教)	1730–1760	Tango no kami (丹後守)	Junior 4th Rank Lower Grade (従五位下)	357,000 koku
7	Nabeshima Shigemochi (鍋島 重茂)	1760–1770	Shinano no kami (信濃守)	Junior 4th Rank Lower Grade (従五位下)	357,000 koku
8	Nabeshima Harushige (鍋島 治茂)	1770–1805	Hizen no kami, Sakone no no shosho (肥前守 左近衛少将)	Junior 4th Rank Lower Grade (従五位下)	357,000 koku
9	Nabeshima Narinao (鍋島 斉直)	1805–1830	Hizen no kami (肥前守)	Junior 4th Rank Lower Grade (従五位下)	357,000 koku
10	Nabeshima Naomasa (鍋島 直正)	1830–1861	Hizen no kami (肥前守)	Junior 4th Rank Lower Grade (従五位下)	357,000 koku
11	Nabeshima Naohiro (鍋島 直大),	1861–1871	Shinano no kami, Hizen no kami (信濃守、肥前守)	Junior 4th Rank Lower Grade (従五位下)	357,000 koku

=== Genealogy (simplified) ===
- I. Nabeshima Katsushige, 1st Lord of Saga (cr. 1607) (1580–1657; r. 1607–1657)
  - Tadanao (1613–1635)
    - II. Mitsushige, 2nd Lord of Saga (1632–1700; r. 1657–1695)
      - III. Tsunashige, 3rd Lord of Saga (1652–1707; r. 1695–1706)
      - IV. Yoshishige, 4th Lord of Saga (1664–1730; r. 1707–1730)
      - V. Muneshige, 5th Lord of Saga (1687–1755; r. 1730–1738)
        - VI. Munenori, 6th Lord of Saga (1718–1780; r. 1738–1760)
        - VII. Shigemochi, 7th Lord of Saga (1733–1770; r. 1760–1770)
        - VIII. Harushige, 5th Lord of Kashima, 8th Lord of Saga (1745–1805; r. 1770–1805)
          - IX. Narinao, 9th Lord of Saga (1780–1839; r. 1805–1830)
            - X. Naomasa, 10th Lord of Saga (1815–1871; r. 1830–1861)
              - XI. Naohiro, 11th Lord of Saga, 17th family head, 1st Marquess(1846–1921; 11th Lord of Saga: 1861–1869, Governor of Saga: 1869–1871, 1st Marquess: 1884)
                - Naomitsu, 18th family head, 2nd Marquess (1872–1943; 18th family head and 2nd Marquess: 1921–1943)
                  - Naoyasu, 19th family head and 3rd Marquess (1907–1981; 19th family head and 3rd Marquess: 1943–1947, 13th family head: 1947–1981)
                    - Naomoto, 20th family head (1935–2008; 20th family head: 1981–2008)
                      - Naoaki, 21st family head (b. 1959; 21st family head: 2008–present)
                        - Naoyori (b. 1991)

=== Relatives ===
- Yasutoshi Yanagisawa (柳沢保恵) – the founder of the Dai-ichi Life (1902–present)
- Yasutsugu Yanagisawa (柳沢保承) – One of the founder of the Taiheiyō Kaijo Kasai Hoken (Pasicfic Marine and Fire Insurance, 1919–1944)

== Other notable Saga natives ==
- Tanaka Hisashige (田中 久重)
- Renya Mutaguchi (牟田口廉也)
- Ōkuma Shigenobu (大隈 重信)
- Nabeshima Shigeyoshi (鍋島 茂義)
- Etō Shinpei (江藤 新平)
- Ōki Takatō (大木 喬任)
- Sano Tsunetami (佐野 常民)
- Shima Yoshitake (島 義勇)

== See also ==
- Abolition of the han system
- List of Han
