= Ryūzōji clan =

Noble family

Ryūzōji clan 龍造寺
- The emblem (mon) of the Ryūzōji clan
- Home province: Hizen
- Parent house: Fujiwara clan
- Titles: Daimyo
- Founder: Fujiwara no Suie
- Final ruler: Ryūzōji Masaie
- Founding year: 1186
- Dissolution: 1607
- Ruled until: 1607, death of Ryūzōji Masaie

Ryūzōji clan (Japanese: 龍造寺氏, Hepburn: Ryūzōji-shi) was a Japanese kin group which traces its origin to Hizen Province on the island of Kyushu.

== History ==
The clan was founded by Fujiwara no Suekiyo in 1186. The clan was allied with Ashikaga Takauji in 1336, but they were defeated in fighting with the Ōtomo clan to the east and Shimazu clan to the south.

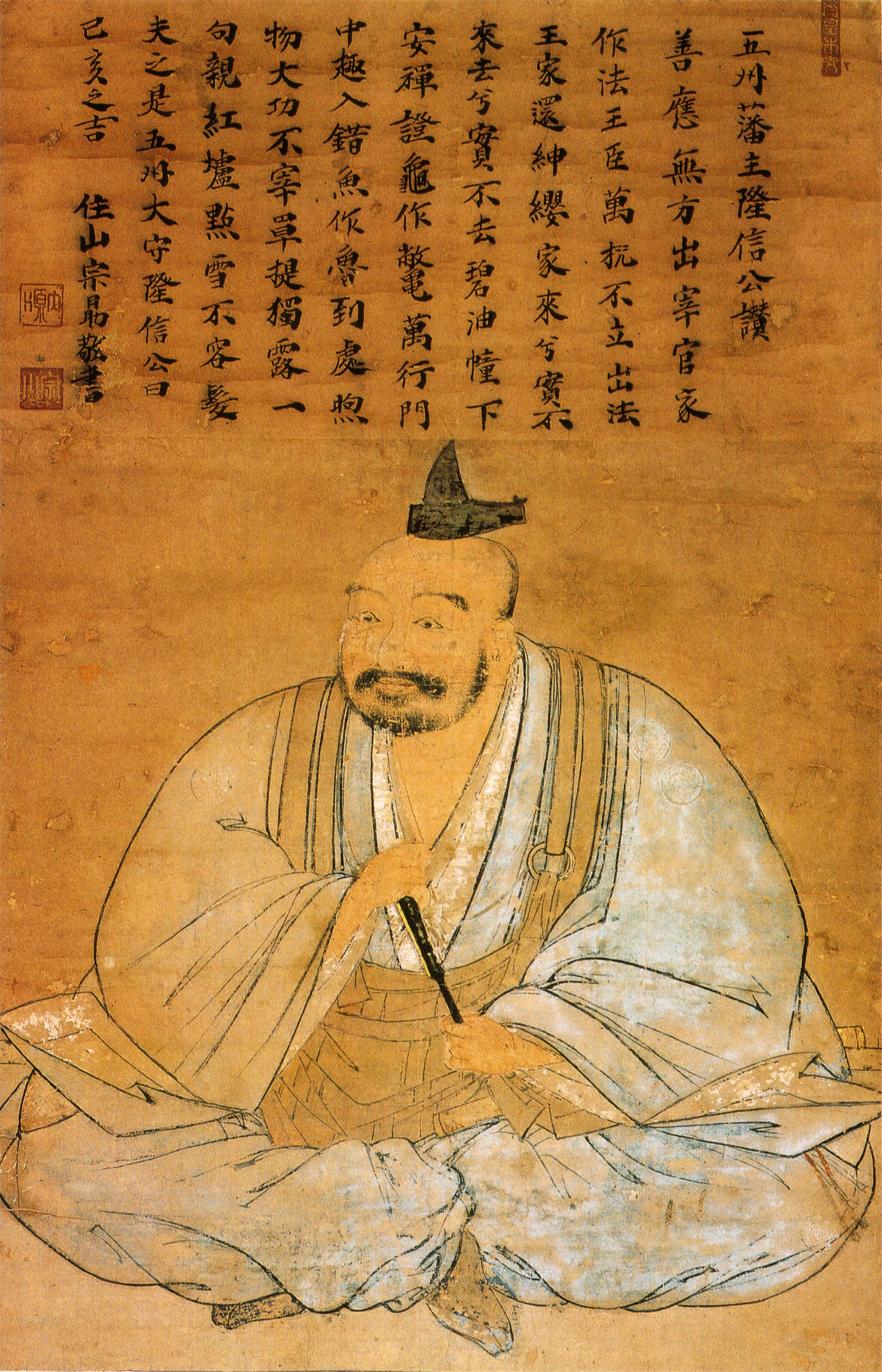
Ryūzōji Takanobu

Ryūzōji Takanobu is known for expanding his clan's holdings. He took land from the Shōni clan. Ryūzōji Masaie (1556–1607) was the son of Takanobu. In 1587, Masaie joined the forces of Toyotomi Hideyoshi against the Shimazu clan. In the same year, he was confirmed as head of the Saga Domain (350,000 koku), but control of the domain passed to Nabeshima Naoshige when Masaie was killed in battle.

== Notable clan leaders ==
- Ryūzōji Chikaie
- Ryūzōji Takanobu
- Ryūzōji Masaie
- Egami Ietane
- Gotō Ienobu
- Ryūzōji Naganobu
- Ryūzōji Nobuchika

== Notable members ==
- Keigin-ni

== Notable retainers ==
- Nabeshima Naoshige
- Arima Harunobu
- Matsura Takanobu
- Ōmura Sumitada
- Gotō Takaakira
- Miyohime
- Hyakutake Tomonake married to Miyohime
- Kinoshita Masanao
- Narimatsu Nobukatsu
- Enjōji Nobutane
- Eriguchi Nobutsuna
- Harada Nobutane
- Naritomi Shigeyasu
- Ogawa Nobuyasu

== Bibliography ==
- 佐賀新聞社 (2006/12).『五州二島の太守龍造寺隆信』. ISBN 4882981610
