= Ryūzōji Takanobu =

Japanese daimyō (1529–1584)

- 龍造寺 隆信
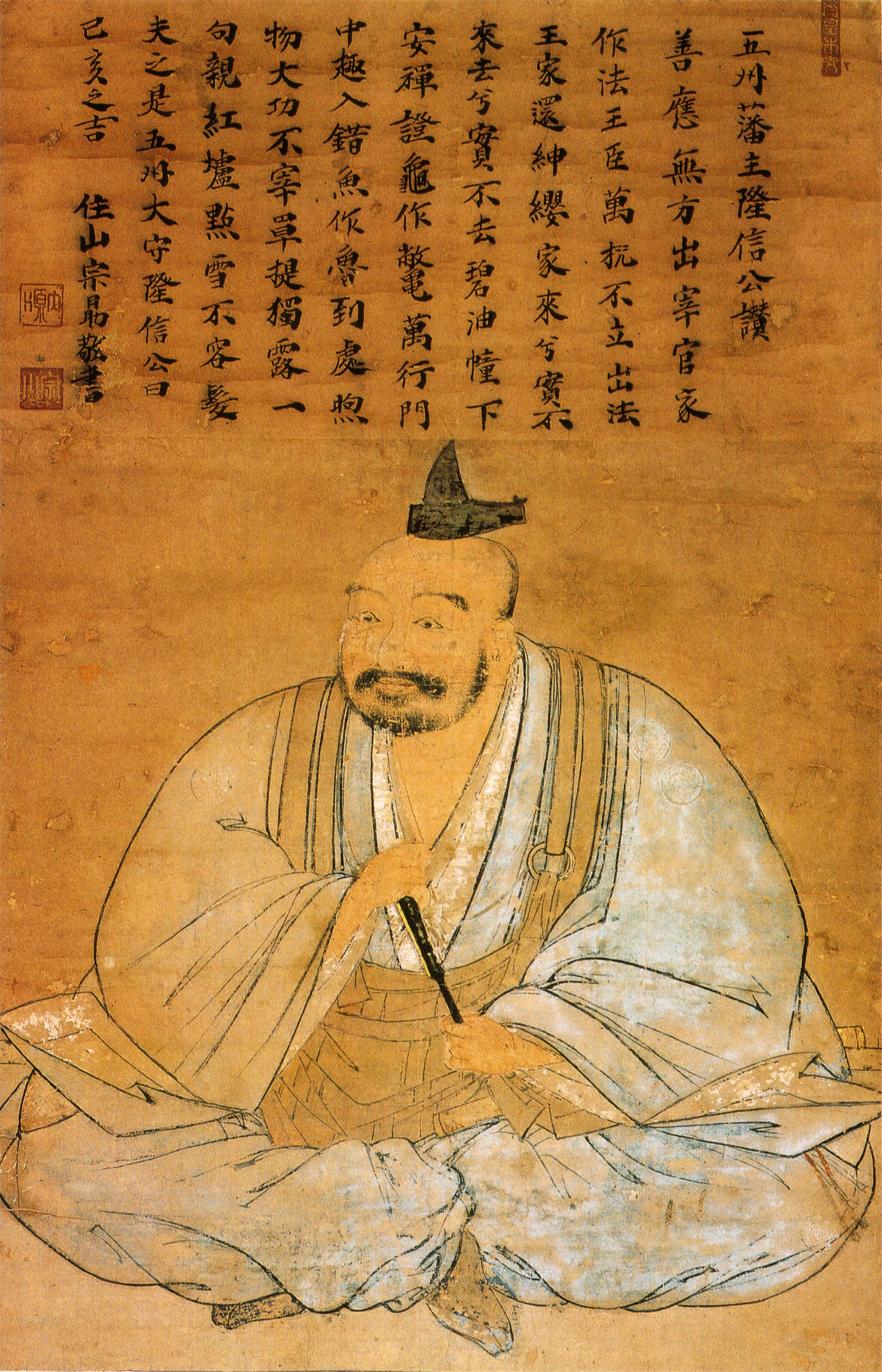

Head of Ryūzōji clan
- In office 1548–1584
- Preceded by: Ryûzôji Chikaie
- Succeeded by: Ryūzōji Masaie

Personal details
- Born: March 24, 1529
- Died: May 4, 1584 (aged 55) Battle of Okitanawate
- Children: Ryūzōji Masaie, Egami Ietane, Gotō Ienobu
- Parent: Ryûzôji Chikaie (father)
- Relatives: Ryūzōji Naganobu (brother) Ryūzōji Nobuchika (brother)

Military service
- Allegiance: Ryūzōji clan Shōni clan
- Commands: Suko Castle
- Battles/wars: Siege of Saga Castle (1554); Battle of Imayama (1570); Siege of Suko Castle (1574); Attacks on Nagasaki (1574–1579); Hizen Campaign (1578); Battle of Okitanawate (1584)

Ryūzōji Takanobu (龍造寺 隆信; March 24, 1529 – May 4, 1584) was a Japanese daimyō in Hizen Province during the Sengoku period. Takanobu was the head of the Ryūzōji clan.

== Biography ==
Takanobu was the grandson of Ryūzōji Iekane (1454-1546). His father was Ryûzôji Chikaie and his mother was Keigin-ni.

Ryūzōji Takanobu is known for expanding his clan's holdings. He took land from the Shōni clan. In 1578, Takanobu conquered almost all of Hizen Province. The following year, the Ryūzōji clan advanced to Chikuzen and Buzen. In 1580, Takanobu retired in Suko castle but he retained the real power until his death.

In 1584, Ryūzōji retainer Arima Harunobu split from the clan. Seizing upon this opportunity, several of the local small clans in the Shimabara Peninsula also rose up in arms. Takanobu personally led an army of around 30,000 against the Shimazu-Arima, but was killed in the Battle of Okitanawate by Shimazu Iehisa's army.

Ryūzōji Masaie (1556–1607) was the son of Takanobu. Following Takanobu's death, Ryūzōji domain was taken over by Takanobu's chief retainer Nabeshima Naoshige.
