= Nabeshima Katsushige =

- 鍋島勝茂
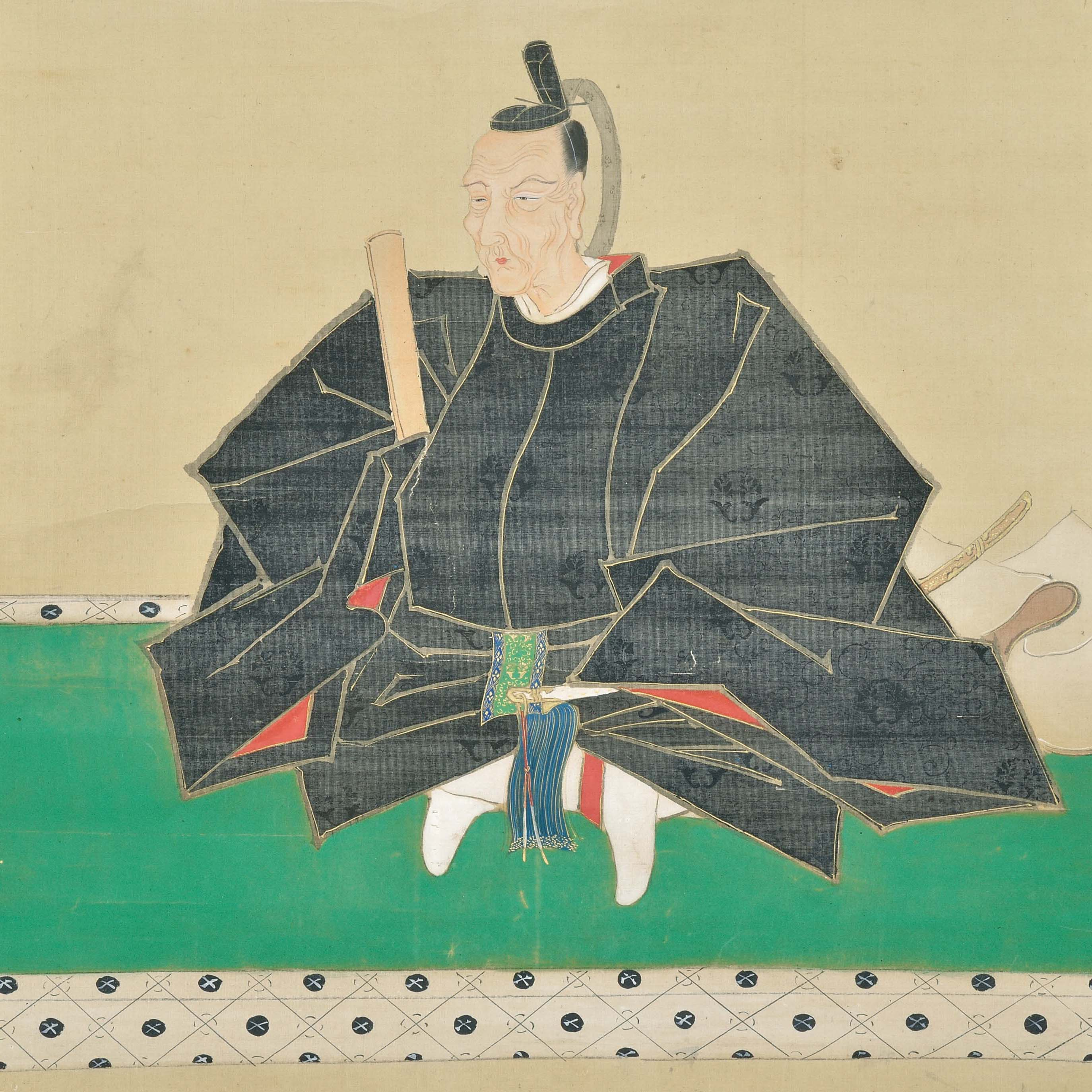
- Born: 1580
- Died: 1657 (aged 76–77)
- Father: Nabeshima Naoshige

Nabeshima Katsushige (鍋島勝茂; December 4, 1580 – May 7, 1657) was a Japanese daimyō of the early Edo period. Born to Nabeshima Naoshige, he became lord of Saga-han.

== Biography ==
Katsushige was born in Saga, the son of Nabeshima Naoshige. At the time, Naoshige was a senior retainer of the Ryuzōji clan. For a time he became the adopted son of Egami Ietane, the 2nd son of Ryūzōji Takanobu; however, he would soon return to his natal family.

In 1597, he joined his father in Korea in the defensive action at Ulsan. In 1600, during the Sekigahara Campaign he sided with the western faction, attacking Fushimi Castle and An'nōzu Castle. Katsushige did not take part in the main action at Sekigahara, and submitted to Tokugawa Ieyasu very quickly afterward.

Confirmed as daimyo of Saga in 1607, he ruled until 1657.

== See also ==
- Imari ware
