= Nabeshima Mitsushige =

Japanese daimyō

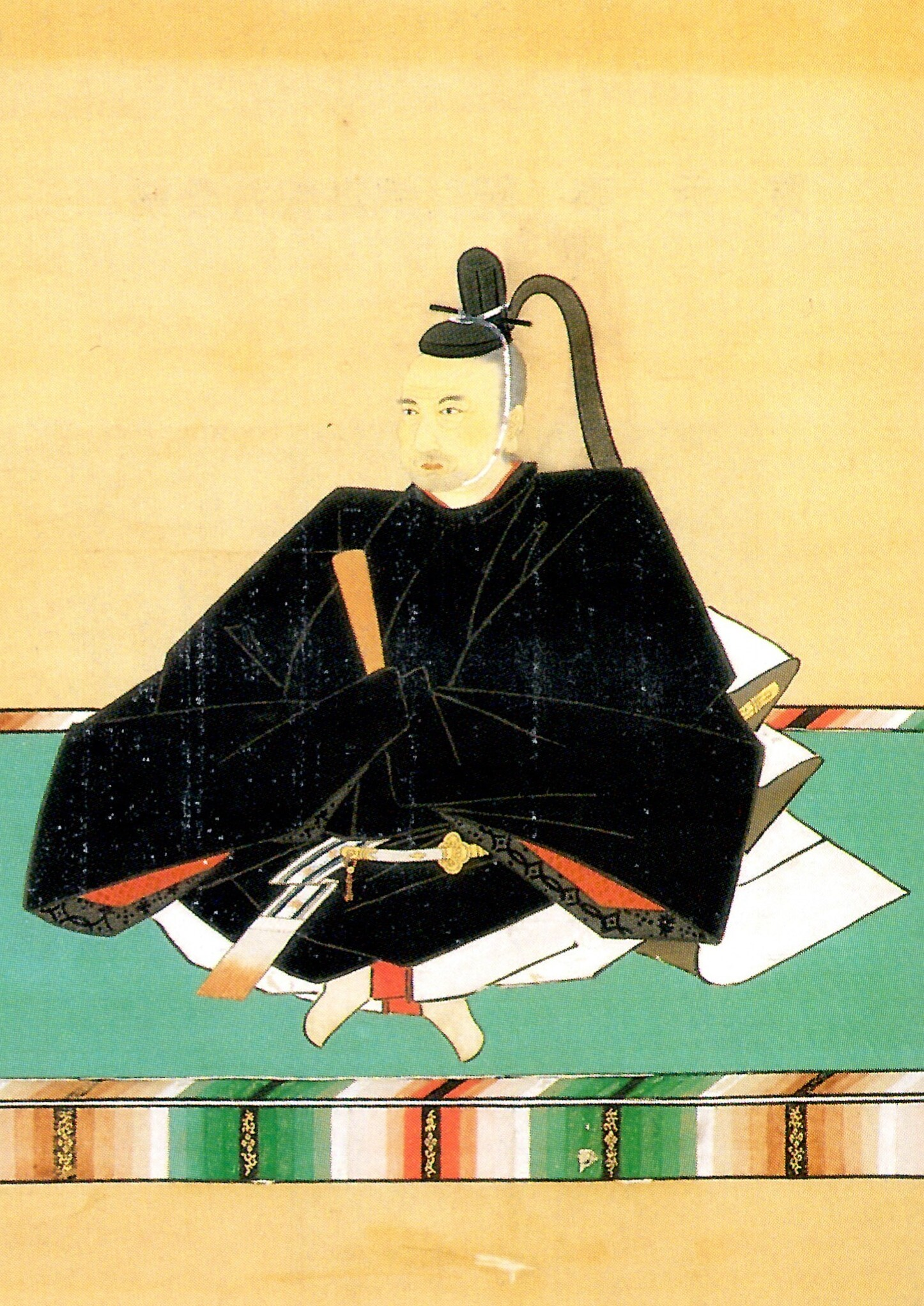
Nabeshima Mitsushige

Nabeshima Mitsushige (鍋島 光茂; July 10, 1632 – July 2, 1700) was a Japanese daimyō of the early Edo period. He was famed for his forbidding of junshi, the form of traditional suicide whereby a retainer followed his lord in death. It was because of this dislike for junshi that one of his favorite retainers Yamamoto Tsunetomo went after his death to pen the Hagakure.
