= Nishi-Shinbashi =

Nishi-Shinbashi 西新橋
- District
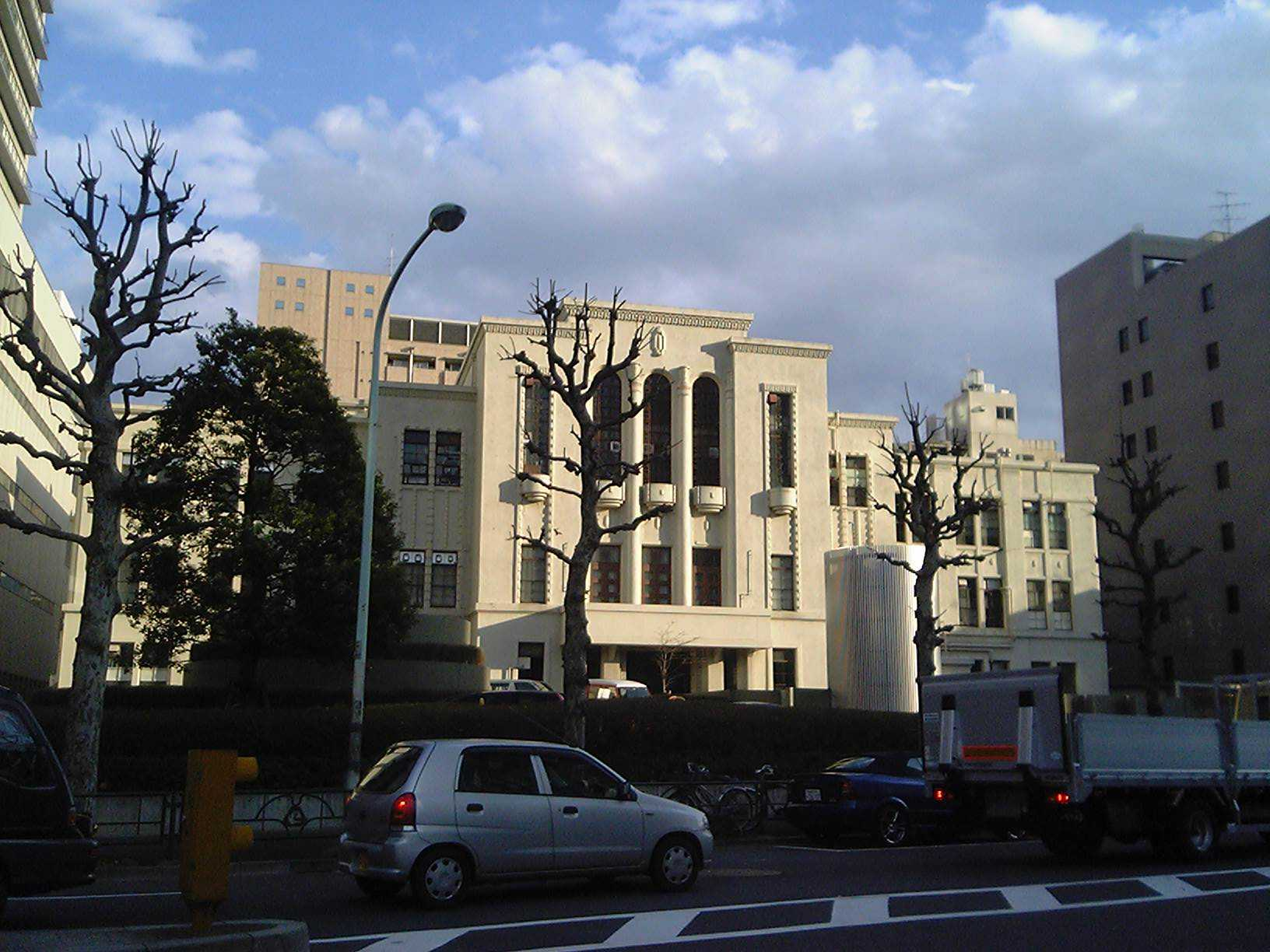
- Jikei University School of Medicine
- Interactive map of Nishi-Shinbashi
- Coordinates: 35.6628°N 139.7507°E
- Country: Japan
- City: Tokyo
- Ward: Minato

Population (January 1, 2016)
  - Total: 1,425
- Time zone: UTC+9 (JST)
- Postal code: 105-0003
- Area code: 03

Nishi-Shinbashi (西新橋) is a district of Minato, Tokyo, Japan. It is home to Toei Mita Line subway stations including Onarimon Station and Uchisaiwaichō Station, as well as medical school Jikei University School of Medicine.

== Education ==
Minato City Board of Education operates public elementary and junior high schools.

Nishishinbashi 1-3-chōme are zoned to Onarimon Elementary School (御成門小学校) and Onarimon Junior High School (御成門中学校).

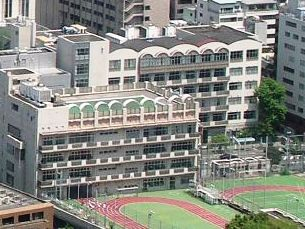
Onarimon Elementary School (御成門小学校) and Onarimon Junior High School (御成門中学校) – the latter is in Nishi-Shinbashi
