= Ra (Japanese textile) =

Traditional Japanese openwork silk textile

Ra (羅; also read usumono, 'sheer fabric') is a lightweight, translucent textile found in the history of Japanese weaving. It is generally made of silk and woven in a form of openwork leno weave, in which warp threads cross adjacent warp threads and are held in place by the weft. The resulting fabric has an open, net-like structure. Ra in which patterns are formed as part of the weave is called mon-ra (文羅, also written 紋羅), while ra without woven patterns is called mumon-ra (無文羅).

Historically, the term ra was used in both a broad and a narrow sense. In its broad sense, it referred generally to lightweight, sheer silk fabrics, including sha (紗), a relatively simple gauze weave, and ro (絽), which combines sections of plain weave with regularly spaced leno-weave openings. In its narrower sense, ra denoted a particular group of complex gauze structures made by interlacing warp threads in more elaborate arrangements. Consequently, textiles described by the character 羅 in Chinese or Korean texts, or archaeological finds classified by that term, do not necessarily have the same fiber material, weave structure, or production technique as Japanese ra. Comparable openwork weaves have also been found in regions such as South America, but they were not locally known as ra; rather, the term has been applied to them within Japanese systems of textile classification. This article focuses primarily on ra in the history of Japanese textiles.

== Terminology and definition ==
The Sino-Japanese term ra derives from the Chinese character 羅, which originally denoted a net used to catch birds. The term was subsequently applied to sheer textiles resembling nets and came to be used more broadly for lightweight or high-quality silk fabrics. In Japanese, the character is read ra or usumono, the latter meaning 'sheer fabric'.

In its broad sense, ra was a general term for loosely woven, lightweight fabrics, including sha (紗) and ro (絽). In its narrower sense, it refers to a weave structure in which parallel weft threads alternately cross adjacent warp threads, with the crossings held in place by the weft.

In this narrower sense, ra is distinguished from sha and ro, which also belong to the family of Japanese leno or gauze weaves, by the way in which the warp threads are manipulated. In sha, two warp threads form a pair and cross around the weft, producing a relatively simple gauze structure. In ro, sections of plain weave alternate at regular intervals with crossings of two warp threads. Varieties are distinguished according to the number of weft picks in each plain-weave section, including three-pick ro (三越絽) and five-pick ro (五越絽). In ra, by contrast, warp threads cross multiple adjacent warp threads, producing open meshwork or geometric patterns.

The distinction cannot, however, be reduced to the simple rule that sha uses two warp threads whereas ra uses three or more. In the traditional classification of yūsoku textiles—fabrics used for Japanese court costume—a special heddle device called a furue (振綜) was used to manipulate two or four warp threads and produce the geometric patterns of ra. At the same time, a structure using three manipulated warp threads that became widespread during the medieval period was regarded as a type of ra but was also known as kenmon-sha (顕紋紗). The historical terms ra, sha, and ro must therefore be understood as classifications involving not only the number of warp threads but also their movement, the manner in which they cross, and the way woven patterns are formed.

Terminology and classification also differ between regions. In the traditional textile classification of the Korean Peninsula, structures in which groups of three or four warp threads cross one another are classified as na (나; 羅, also pronounced ra in Korean), while structures using pairs of warp threads are classified as sa (사; 紗). By contrast, hangra (항라; 亢羅), despite containing the character 羅 in its name, is classified as a ro weave. It alternates sections of plain weave with regularly spaced crossings of two warp threads and is not classified as a ra structure. The presence of the character 羅 in a textile's name therefore does not, by itself, indicate that it has the same structure as Japanese ra.

Patterned ra, known as mon-ra (文羅 or 紋羅), is produced by varying the way in which the warp threads cross so that the pattern forms as an integral part of the weave. It is therefore distinct from plain ra to which a pattern has subsequently been added by dyeing or embroidery. Ra without woven patterns is called mumon-ra (無文羅). The Shōsō-in repository preserves examples of mon-ra woven with diamond-shaped, lattice-like, and other geometric patterns.

== History in Japan ==
=== Ancient period ===
When and by what route the technique of weaving ra reached Japan remains uncertain. Whether individual early examples were imported from continental East Asia or woven locally in Japan must therefore be considered separately for each surviving textile.

The surviving fragments of the Tenjukoku Shūchō Mandala, traditionally said to have been commissioned in 622—the thirtieth year of the reign of Empress Suiko—following the death of Prince Shōtoku, include purple ra used as a base fabric for embroidery. The extant work incorporates both early fragments and sections added when the embroidery was reproduced during the Kamakura period (1185–1333), but the purple ra section remains an important early example of both ra and embroidery preserved in Japan.

The production of ra flourished during the Nara period (710–794). It was woven in various parts of Japan and used for court dress and other forms of attire. The Shōsō-in, an eighth-century imperial repository in Nara, preserves numerous examples. Its finely woven mon-ra, featuring intricate patterns formed as part of the weave, demonstrates the advanced level attained by Japanese weaving techniques during this period.

The Shōsō-in textiles include patterned ra, dyed ra, and belts made from the fabric. Some belts were embroidered over a ground of ra, showing that the textile was used not only as a lightweight, sheer fabric but also as a decorative ground in combination with dyeing and embroidery.

=== Heian and medieval periods ===
From the Heian period (794–1185) onward, ra was used for the kanmuri, the court cap worn by male members of the court nobility, and for the mo (裳), a train-like ceremonial skirt worn as part of women's formal court dress. The ra used for kanmuri was divided into patterned and unpatterned varieties. Under the Japanese court-rank system, those holding the Fifth Rank or above are said to have worn kanmuri made from patterned ra, while those of the Sixth Rank or below wore caps made from unpatterned ra.

Atsuta Shrine in Aichi Prefecture preserves two mo skirts officially designated "Mo, white triple-tasuki-pattern ra weave" (裳 白三重襷文羅織) as part of the group of objects collectively designated an Important Cultural Property under the title "Ancient Sacred Treasures" (古神宝類). One of the two, dated to the fifteenth century and bearing the inventory designation "Ro" (呂号), is cataloged as "Mo of white ra with a triple-tasuki pattern" (裳 白地三重襷模様羅〔呂号〕). It was woven with extremely fine raw-silk warp threads and slightly thicker raw-silk weft threads, forming a geometric triple-tasuki pattern. The textile demonstrates that ra continued to be woven in medieval Japan.

During the medieval period, kenmon-sha, woven by manipulating three warp threads, became increasingly widespread. At the same time, the complex forms of patterned ra inherited from the ancient period gradually became coarser, and the techniques required to produce finely woven ra declined.

The Ōnin War (1467–1477) had a major effect on the production of high-quality textiles in Kyoto. In 1497 (Meiō 6), the diary Sanetaka Kōki records a report that ra used for kanmuri could no longer be woven. This indicates that, by that time, the production of ra for court caps had become difficult.

=== Early modern period ===
The ra used for kanmuri, which had temporarily become impossible to produce after the Ōnin War, had been revived by the early Edo period (1603–1868). A kanmuri recovered from the Taitoku-in Mausoleum of Tokugawa Hidetada at Zōjō-ji was made from a basic open-mesh ra. Since Hidetada died in 1632, the find shows that ra for court caps was again being woven by that year at the latest.

The revived fabric, however, had a coarse mesh and weft threads markedly thicker than the warp, making it very different from the finely woven ra of the Nara period. Although the basic open-mesh form was restored, the technique for weaving complex patterns into mon-ra is not thought to have been revived during the Edo period.

At the imperial court, the weaving of mumon-ra was restored in connection with the revival of the Daijō-sai ceremony in 1687. Patterned kanmuri were thereafter made by embroidering motifs onto mumon-ra. A cap with densely arranged motifs was known as a shigemon no kanmuri (繁文冠, 'densely patterned court cap'). A cap with fewer motifs placed farther apart was called a tōmon no kanmuri (遠文冠, 'court cap with widely spaced patterns').

Thus, the patterns on early modern patterned court caps were not formed as part of the weave itself but were embroidered onto unpatterned ra. Their method of manufacture therefore differed from that of ancient and medieval caps made from woven patterned ra.

=== Modern revival ===
From the late Taishō era onward, weaving specialists in Kyoto's Nishijin weaving industry attempted to reconstruct ra, recreating a variety of ra weave structures.

Heirō Kitagawa studied ancient textiles, including textile fragments preserved in the Shōsō-in, and worked to reconstruct ra weaving. In 1956, he was recognized as a holder of an Important Intangible Cultural Property for the technique of ra weaving.

Takeshi Kitamura likewise researched and reconstructed ancient textiles, while developing ra as a medium for contemporary textile art. In 1995, he was recognized as a holder of an Important Intangible Cultural Property for the technique of ra weaving. These revival efforts made it possible once again to produce ra with woven patterns.

Reproductions of the Shōsō-in textiles have also been made after detailed examination of the original threads, weave structures, patterns, and colors. To obtain silk yarn resembling that used in antiquity, cocoons of Koishimaru, a traditional Japanese silkworm strain, were used in an attempt to reproduce examples of patterned ra preserved in the Shōsō-in.

== Ra and related weaves outside Japan ==
When comparing Japanese ra with textiles from other regions, distinctions must be made between terminology, fiber materials, and weave structures. Even when the same written character, 羅, is used, the range of textiles it denotes may differ according to period and region. Conversely, comparable techniques in which warp threads are crossed to create an open mesh may have developed independently in regions where the textiles were known by entirely different names.

=== China ===
In China, the term luó (羅; simplified 罗) has historically been used with several meanings, including a net, a lightweight silk fabric, fine-quality silk, and particular forms of gauze weave. Fabrics with luó weave structures are considered to have been known by the Han dynasty.

Among silk textiles excavated from a Liao dynasty tomb, researchers identified an example of four-end complex gauze (四经绞罗), in which four warp threads were twisted around one another at predetermined angles and secured by a weft thread. The textile was made from silk produced by the domesticated silkworm (Bombyx mori) and formed a regular mesh of evenly spaced openings. This finding establishes the material and weave structure of one particular surviving textile. It does not demonstrate that all textiles called luó in China had the same structure, or that the Chinese example belonged to a direct line of transmission leading to Japanese ra.

=== Korean Peninsula ===
Ancient textiles classified as ra have also been excavated on the Korean Peninsula. Finds from Baekje tombs and temple sites include ra adhering to headgear as well as separate textile fragments, with both patterned and unpatterned examples identified. Attempts have also been made to reconstruct the weaving techniques on the basis of analyses of these excavated textiles.

These classifications, however, are based on historical sources and archaeological finds from the Korean Peninsula. The shared use of the character 羅 in Japan, China, and Korea does not by itself establish that the textiles had the same fiber materials, weave structures, production techniques, or historical lineage.

=== South America ===
Techniques in which warp threads are crossed to create an open mesh are not confined to East Asia. Textiles excavated in the Andean region and dated to the pre-Inca period, around 500–300 BCE, include leno-weave structures that have been described in Japanese textile classification as corresponding to ra.

Whereas Chinese and Japanese ra was made primarily from silk, the Andean examples were woven from cotton yarn. This difference in fiber material has been cited in support of the view that the techniques developed independently in the two regions. The South American textiles were not locally known as ra; rather, their structures were retrospectively classified as corresponding to ra in Japanese textile terminology.

== See also ==
- Tanmono – traditional Japanese cloth and its principal weave structures
- Japanese silk – history of silk production in Japan
