= Zuijin Teiki Emaki =

Japanese emakimono or emaki (painted narrative handscroll)

- 随身庭騎絵巻
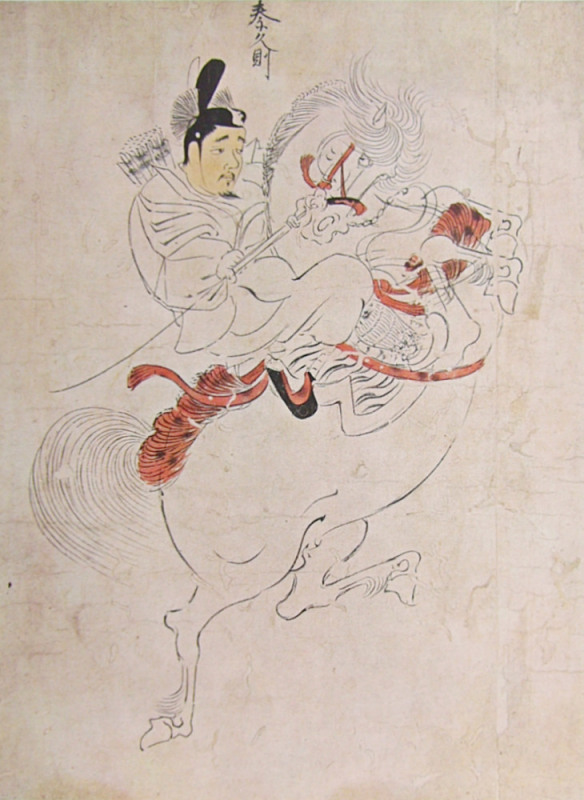
- The fourth of the nine equestrian portraits on the scroll
- Artist: Often attributed, without certainty, to Fujiwara no Nobuzane
- Completion date: 13th century, in or after 1247
- Medium: Emakimono; Paint and ink on paper handscroll
- Movement: Yamato-e, nise-e
- Subject: Equestrian portraits of Imperial Guards
- Dimensions: 28.7 cm × 237.5 cm (11.3 in × 93.5 in)
- Designation: National Treasure
- Location: Okura Museum of Art, Tokyo
- Owner: Okura Cultural Foundation

The Zuijin Teiki Emaki (随身庭騎絵巻; "Illuminated Scroll of the Imperial Guards" or "Illuminated Scroll of the Imperial Guard Cavalry"), is an emakimono or emaki (painted narrative handscroll) from the 13th century, in the Kamakura period of Japanese history (1185–1333). An illuminated manuscript, it presents nine equestrian portraits of Imperial Guards, painted according to the nise-e technique.

== Background ==
Originating in Japan in the sixth or seventh century through trade with the Chinese Empire, emakimono art spread widely among the aristocracy in the Heian period. An emakimono consists of one or more long scrolls of paper narrating a story through Yamato-e texts and paintings. The reader discovers the story by progressively unrolling the scroll with one hand while rewinding it with the other hand, from right to left (according to the then horizontal writing direction of Japanese script), so that only a portion of text or image of about 60 cm (24 in) is visible.

The Kamakura period (1185–1333), the advent of which followed a period of political turmoil and civil wars, was marked by the coming to power of the warrior class (the samurai). Artistic production was very strong, exploring even more varied themes and techniques than before, and signalling the "golden age" of emakimono (the 12th and 13th centuries).

== Description ==
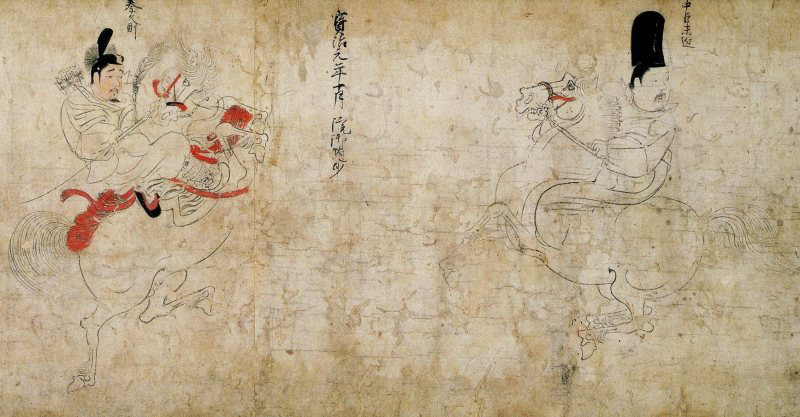
The third (right) and fourth (left) guards; the difference in epoques between the two guards (the second half of the 12th century and the middle of the 13th century, respectively) can be seen in the clothing

The emakimono consists of a scroll of paper 28.7 cm (11.3 in) high by 237.5 cm (93.5 in) long, on which is painted a series of nine equestrian portraits of Imperial Guards stationed near the Daijō Tennō (retired emperor). The name of each guard is inscribed near his portrait, from right to left (Japanese reading direction): Hata Kanekiyo, Hata Kanetō, Nakatomi Suechika, Hata Hisanori, Hata Kanetoshi, Hata Kanmi, Hata Yorikata, Hata Hisayori and Hata Hirokata.

The first three guards were active around 1152–1180 during the Heian, while the last six, painted in order of importance, were in office in 1247 during the Kamakura period, as revealed by the vertical inscription present before this group. This period difference is faithfully transcribed in the equipment and clothing of the guards. The first three guards are dressed in the traditional costume known as the suikan and wear the tate-eboshi, a high black hat. The remaining seven guards wear the kare-ginu, a costume less ample than the suikan, with pants that are kept tucked inside heavy boots below the knee, and each one also wears a quiver filled with arrows on his back.

== Dating and author ==
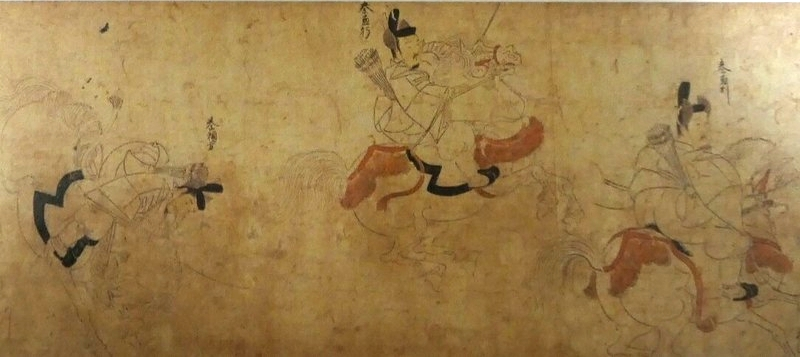
Fifth (right), sixth (middle) and seventh (left) portraits

An inscription located ahead of the fourth guard mentions the month of October 1247, and the emakimono could therefore have been created during or close to that month.

A widespread hypothesis among art historians attributes the work to Fujiwara no Nobuzane (born c. 1176 and died c. 1266), a renowned painter greatly appreciated for his portraits, perhaps with the help of his son Sen-amida-butsu for the last two portraits, the rendering of which differs significantly from that of the other guards. However, there is no certainty about these attributions; as the lines vary through the portraits, the work could have been carried out by several artists, or by one artist using changes of style.

== Style ==
The portraits in the work are perfectly representative of works created at the end of the 12th century according to the nise-e technique, a current of the Yamato-e painting style that can be defined as the art of realistic portraits of the Kamakura period. Nise-e was part of the search for realism in painting initiated at that time, in opposition to older pictorial movements under which the faces were stylised or idealised, without a search for authenticity.

The nise-e genre emerged at the end of the Fujiwara period, in the late 12th century. Before then, portraiture of living figures was uncommon outside Buddhist monks; secular portraits were largely limited to commemorating the deceased. A shift in this convention is attested in the diary Gyokuyō of the court poet and calligrapher Kujō Kanezane (1149–1207): in 1173, a group portrait was painted on the walls of the Buddhist temple Saishōkō-in, commemorating imperial excursions to Mount Kōya and other sacred sites. The project was overseen by Tokiwa Mitsunaga, with the faces of the courtiers painted by Fujiwara no Takanobu (1142–1205). Kanezane, who had not taken part in the excursions, is recorded as noting the striking realism of the resulting portraits.

The rendering of the nine portraits is based mainly on thin black lines drawn in India ink, the colour being limited to discreet touches for the faces and harnesses of the horses. The pictorial technique is therefore linked to the hakubyō tradition popular during the Kamakura period: monochrome drawing in ink on plain paper.

Execution, however, varies within the series. The first three portraits show guards from the second half of the 12th century: the lines are very free and expressive, without much recourse to preparatory sketches. As these guards belonged to an older era, it is possible that their portraits were copied from an older scroll. The next four guards (from the fourth to the seventh in the scroll) have a relatively similar stroke, but are based on an initial sketch with fine lines that was then supplemented by thicker brush strokes. In addition, the details of the faces, and especially the nostrils, in these four portraits are more marked than in the first three. The last two portraits are distinguished by the more vigorous use of the brush, as well as a more restrained line scrupulously following the preparatory lines, giving an impression of lower quality. Despite their stylistic differences, all portraits also share recurring elements, including the individuality of the faces, the naturalistic rendering of the horses and the extensive use of fine lines.

== Provenance ==
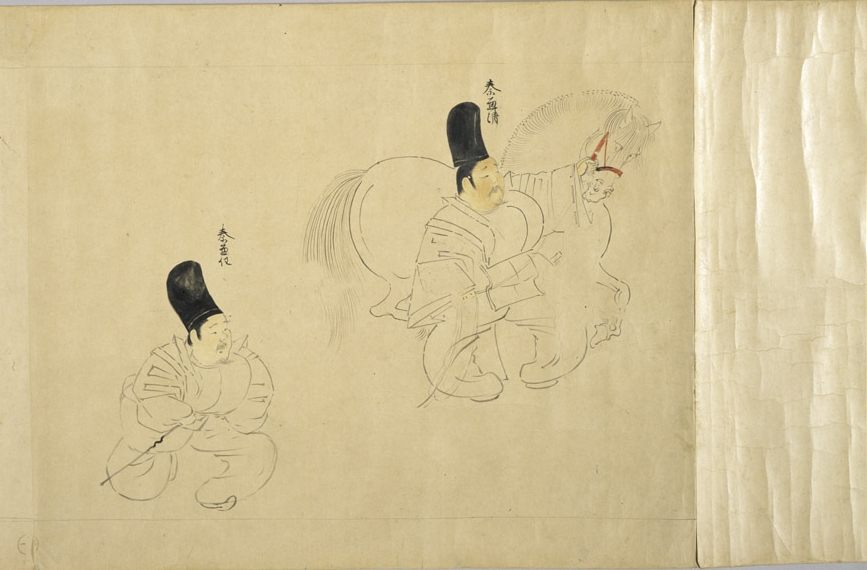
The first two portraits in the Kanō Kazunobu version dating from the 19th century.

The history of the scroll remains largely unknown until the 17th century. An entry in the Sumiyoshi-ke Kantei-hikae reveals that in 1731, it was in possession of the Tokugawa clan, then the ruling dynasty of Japan. In 1953, the work was classified as a National Treasure of Japan. It is now held by the Okura Museum of Art in Tokyo.

The Tokyo National Museum holds a copy made by Kanō Kazunobu (1816–1863), of the 19th century Kanō school.

== See also ==
- List of National Treasures of Japan (paintings)
