= Zōjō-ji =

Buddhist temple in Tokyo, Japan

Coordinates: 35.657479°N 139.748376°E

- 三縁山増上寺
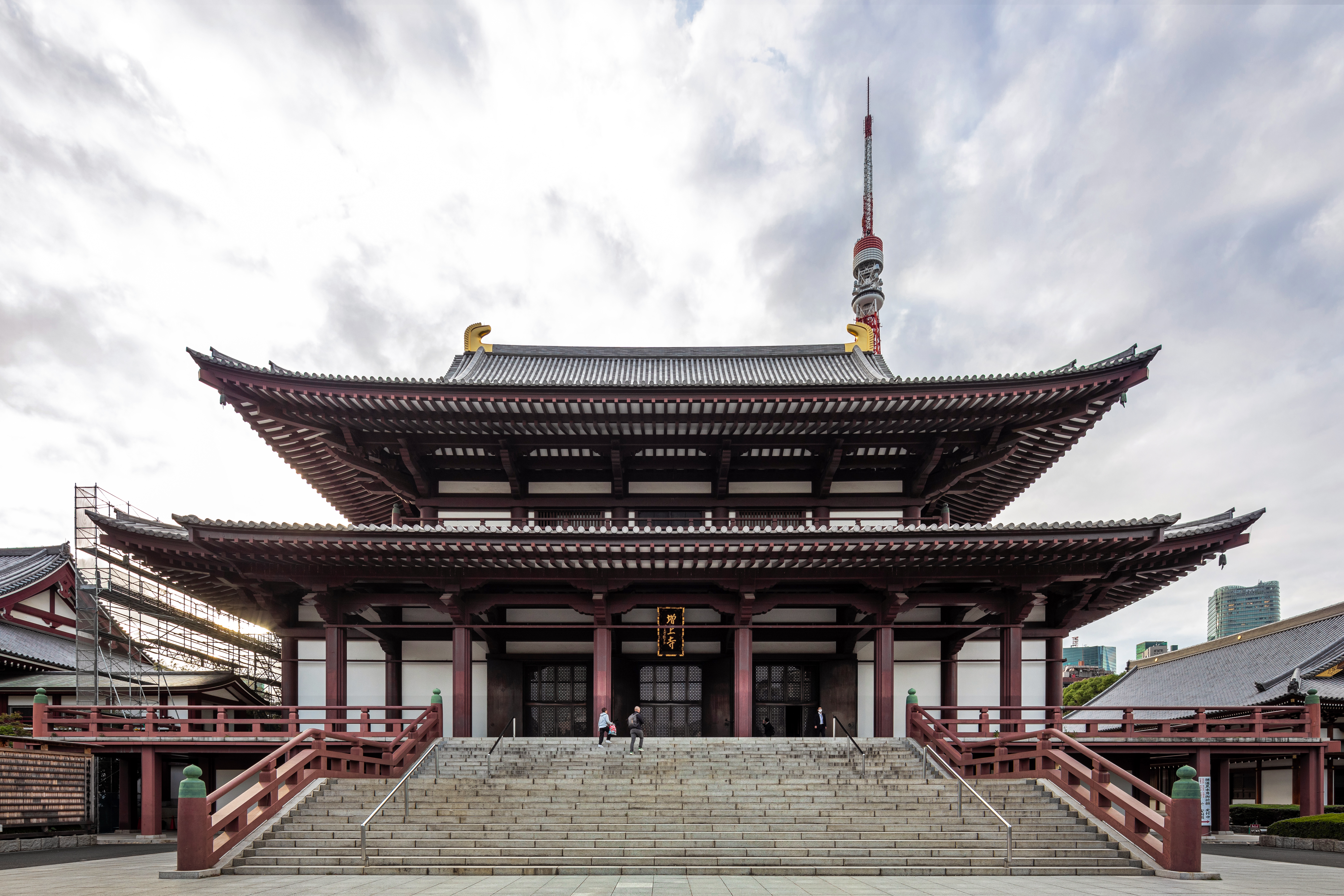
- Hondo (main hall) and the Tokyo Tower in 2024

Religion
- Affiliation: Jōdo-shū
- Deity: Amida Buddha

Location
- Location: 4 Chome-7-35 Shibakoen, Minato, Tokyo 105-0011
- Country: Japan
- Interactive map of Zōjō-ji

Architecture
- Founder: Yūyo Shōsō
- Completed: 1393

Website
- zojoji.or

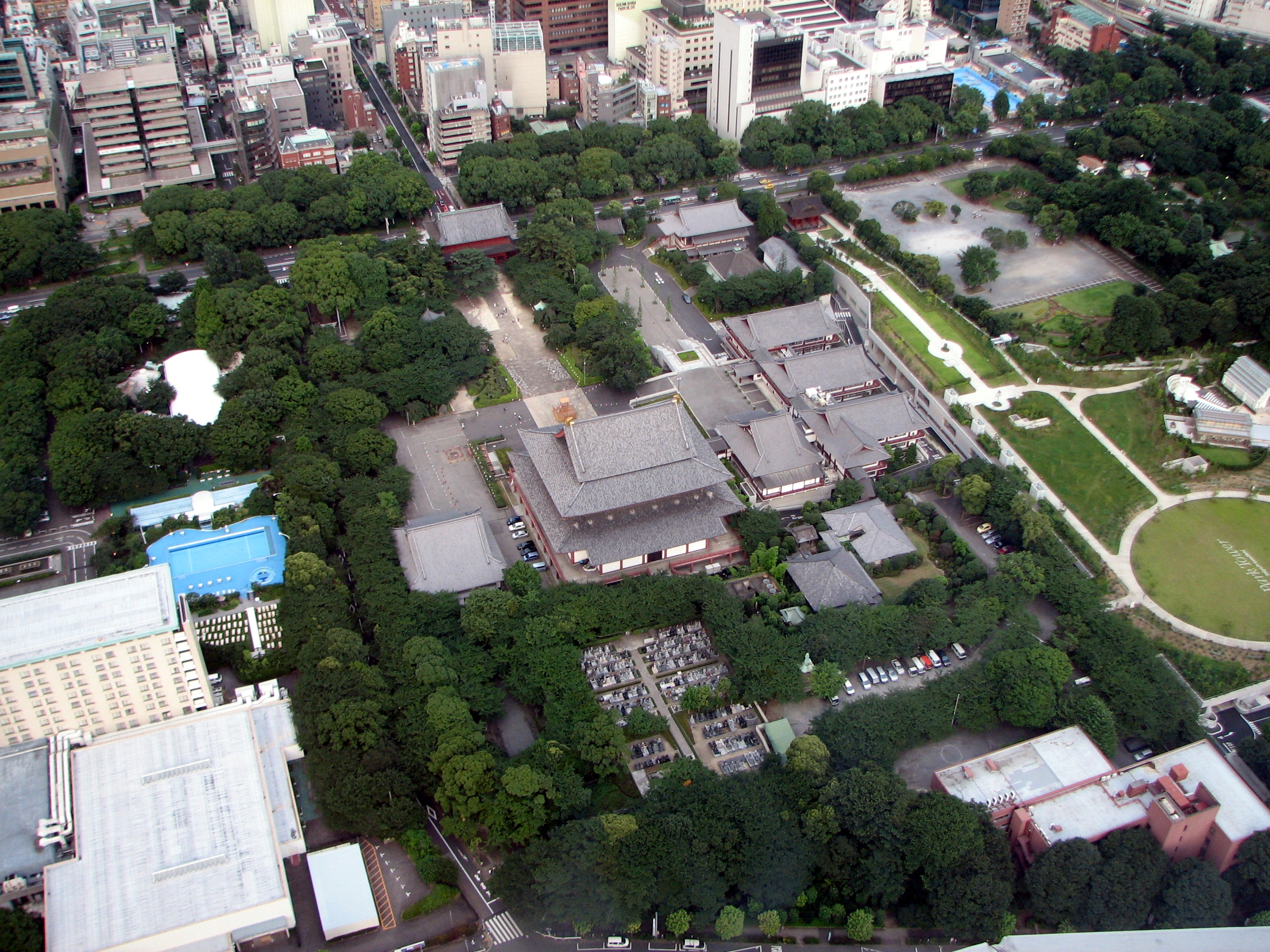
Aerial view of Zojoji as seen from Tokyo Tower

Zōjō-ji (増上寺) is a Jōdo-shū Buddhist temple in Minato, Tokyo, Japan. It is the main temple of the Jōdo-shū ("Pure Land") Chinzei sect of Buddhism in the Kantō region. Its mountain name is San'en-zan (三縁山).

Zōjō-ji is notable for its relationship with the Tokugawa clan, the rulers of Japan during the Edo period, with six of the Tokugawa shōguns being buried in the Taitoku-in Mausoleum in the temple grounds. Also, the temple's Sangedatsumon (main gate) is the oldest wooden building in Tokyo, dating from 1622. The original buildings, temples, mausoleums and the cathedral were destroyed by fire, natural disasters or air raids during World War II.

It is located in the Shiba neighborhood of Minato. The Shiba Park is built around the temple, with the Tokyo Tower standing beside it. In 2015 a Treasure Gallery was opened on the underground level of the Daiden (great hall), and it currently houses paintings of Kanō Kazunobu and a model of the Taitoku-in Mausoleum.

The temple remains active "as the main temple of Jodo shu and the central nembutsu seminary for priests and novices."

== History ==
Shūei (宗叡, 809-884), a disciple of Kūkai, founded a temple named Kōmyō-ji (光明寺) at Kaizuka (貝塚, present-day Kōjimachi in Chiyoda, Tokyo); it is said to have been the forerunner of Zōjō-ji. In 1393, during the Muromachi period, the temple, under its abbot Yūyo Shōsō, converted from Shingon to the Jōdo school. Shōsō is thus regarded as the founder of Zōjō-ji.

Together with Kan'ei-ji, during the Edo period Zōjō-ji was the Tokugawa's family temple. Tokugawa Ieyasu had the temple moved, first to Hibiya, then in 1590, at the time of expansion of Edo Castle, to its present location.

With the fall of the Tokugawa shogunate, the grounds took on the character of a public park. The temple was badly damaged in World War II, but still retains the air of a major temple.

== Architecture ==
At its peak the temple grounds had more than 120 buildings, but following the decline of Buddhism during the Meiji period (1868-1912), most of them burned during the Bombing of Tokyo in World War II. Reconstruction began after the war, with the Daiden (great hall) being rebuilt in 1974.

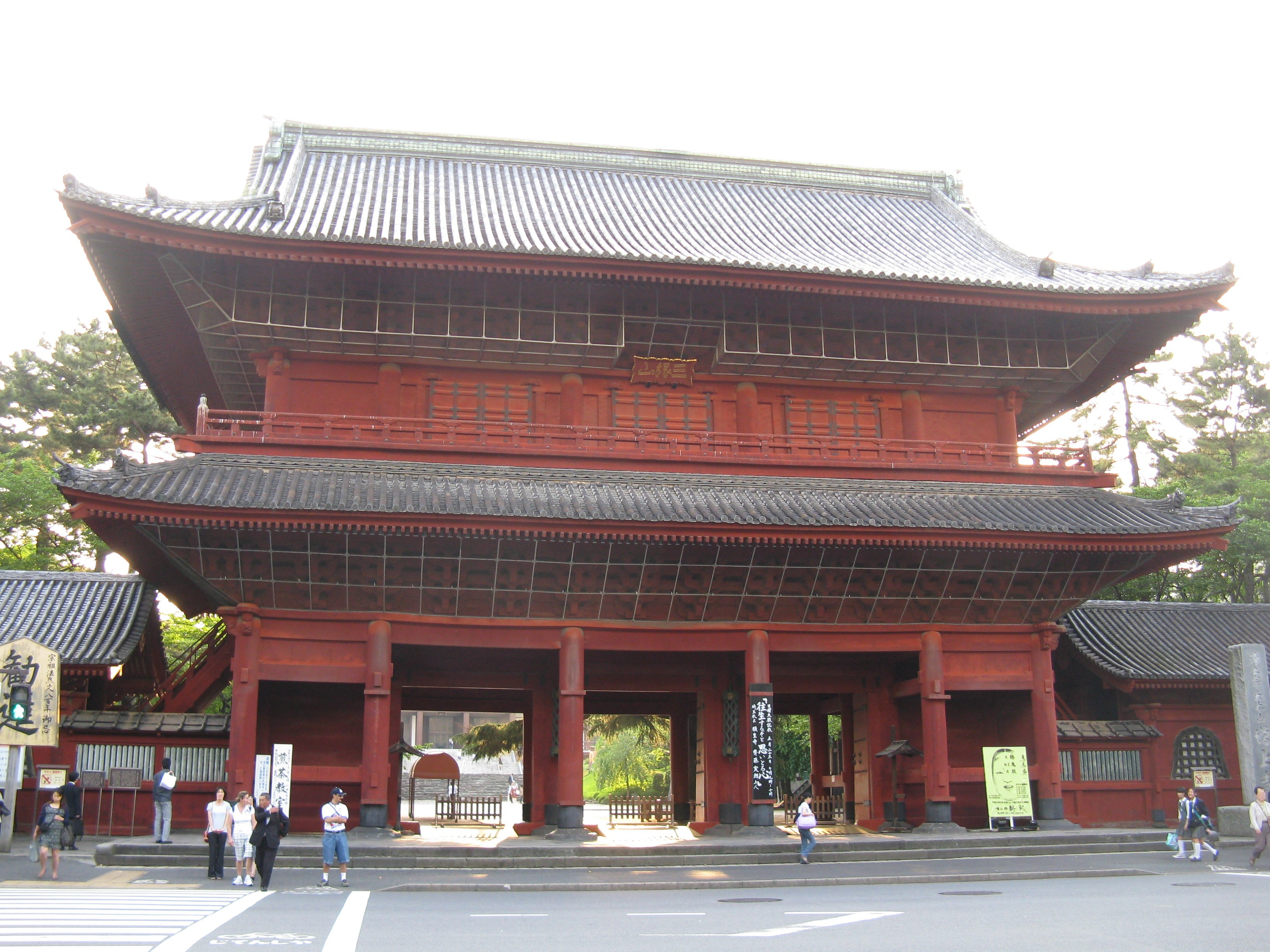
Sangedatsumon (main gate)

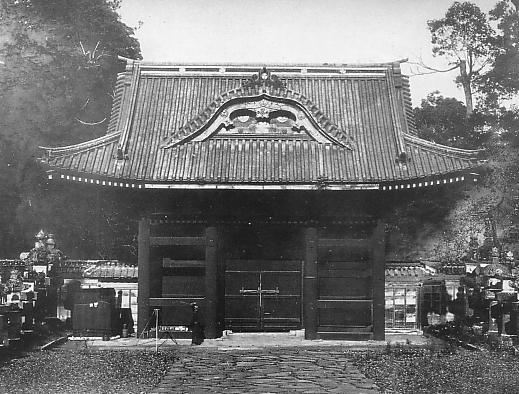
Mausoleum of Taitokuin

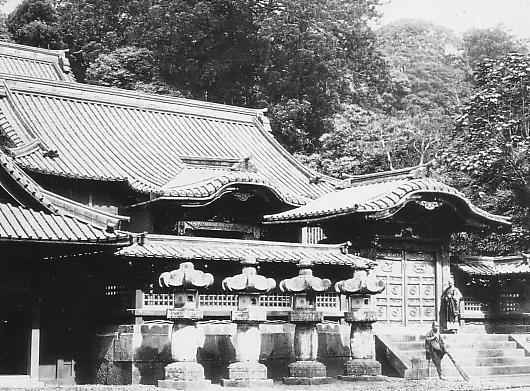
Mausoleum of Sugenin

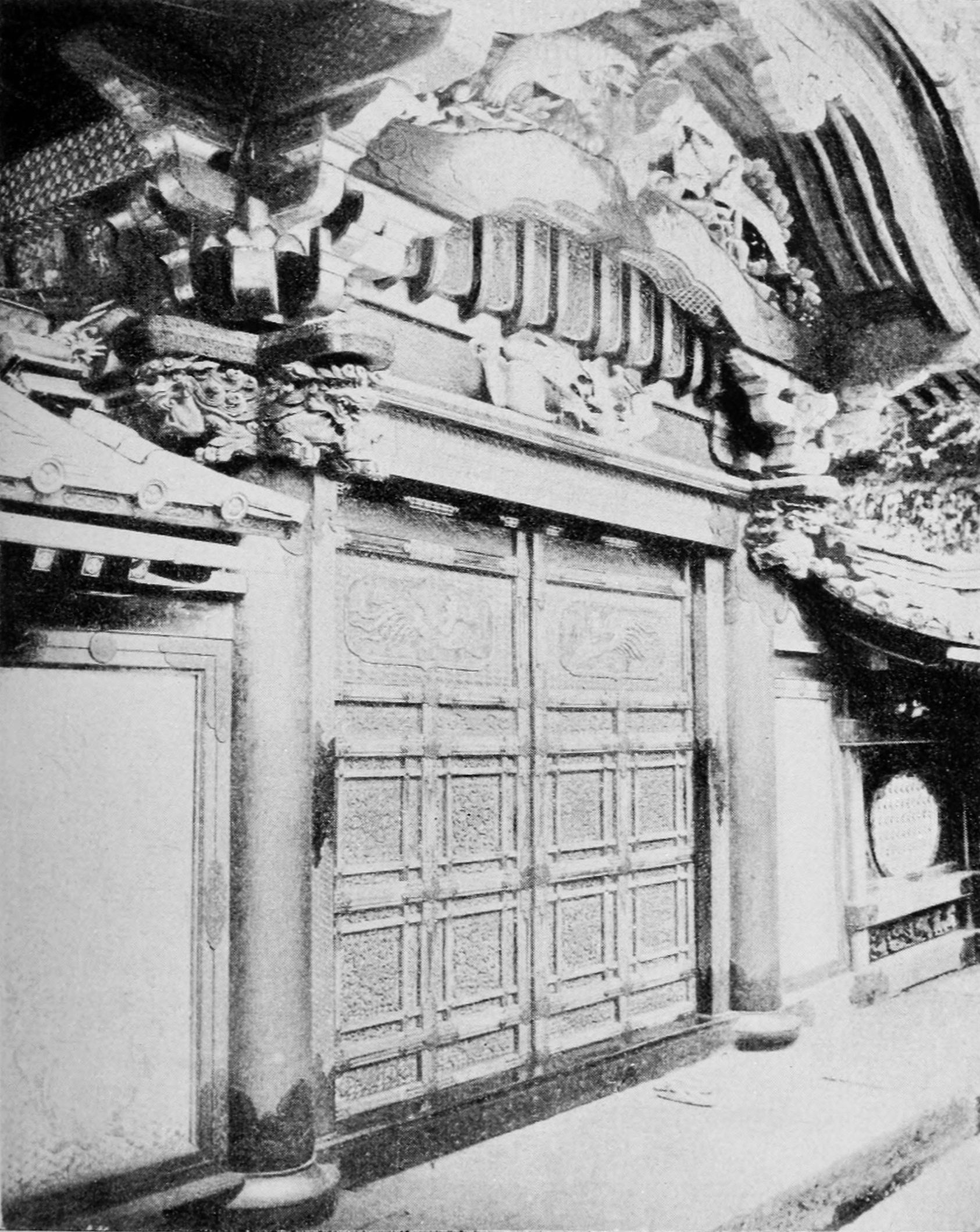
Inner gate leading to the Mausoleum

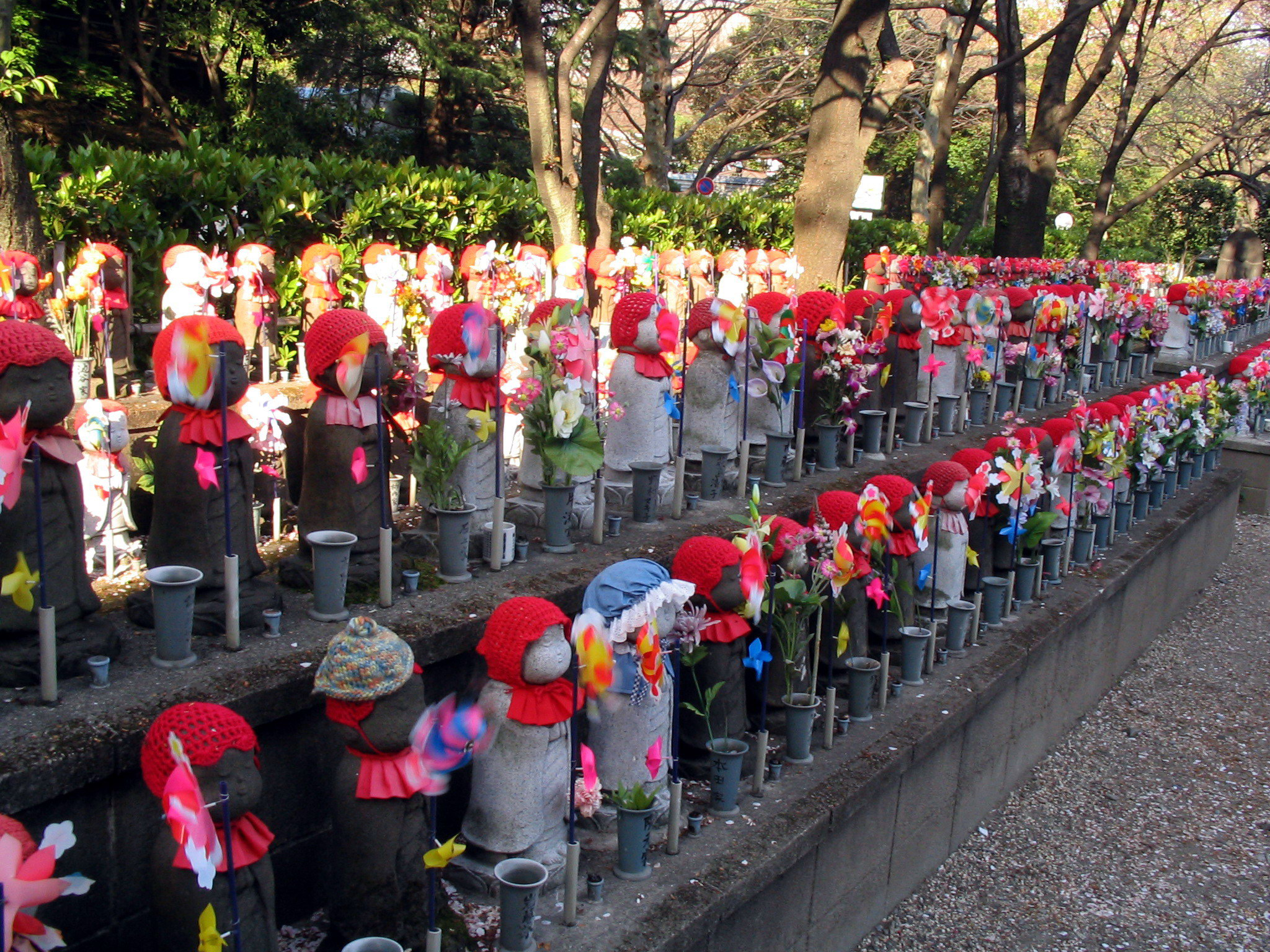
Jizō statues at the cemetery

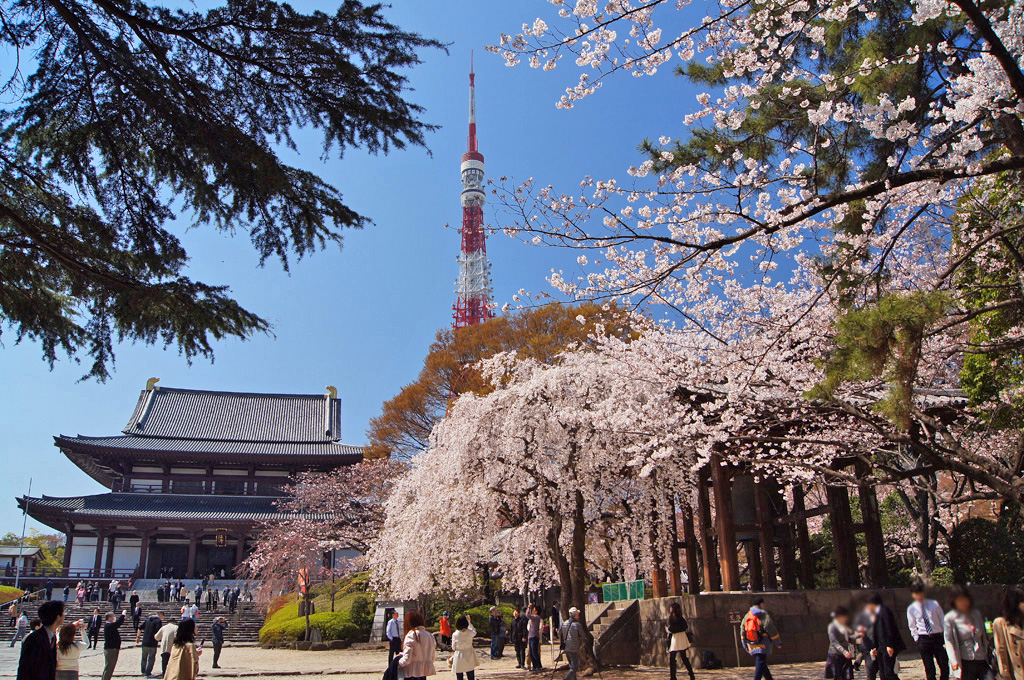
Cherry Blossoms

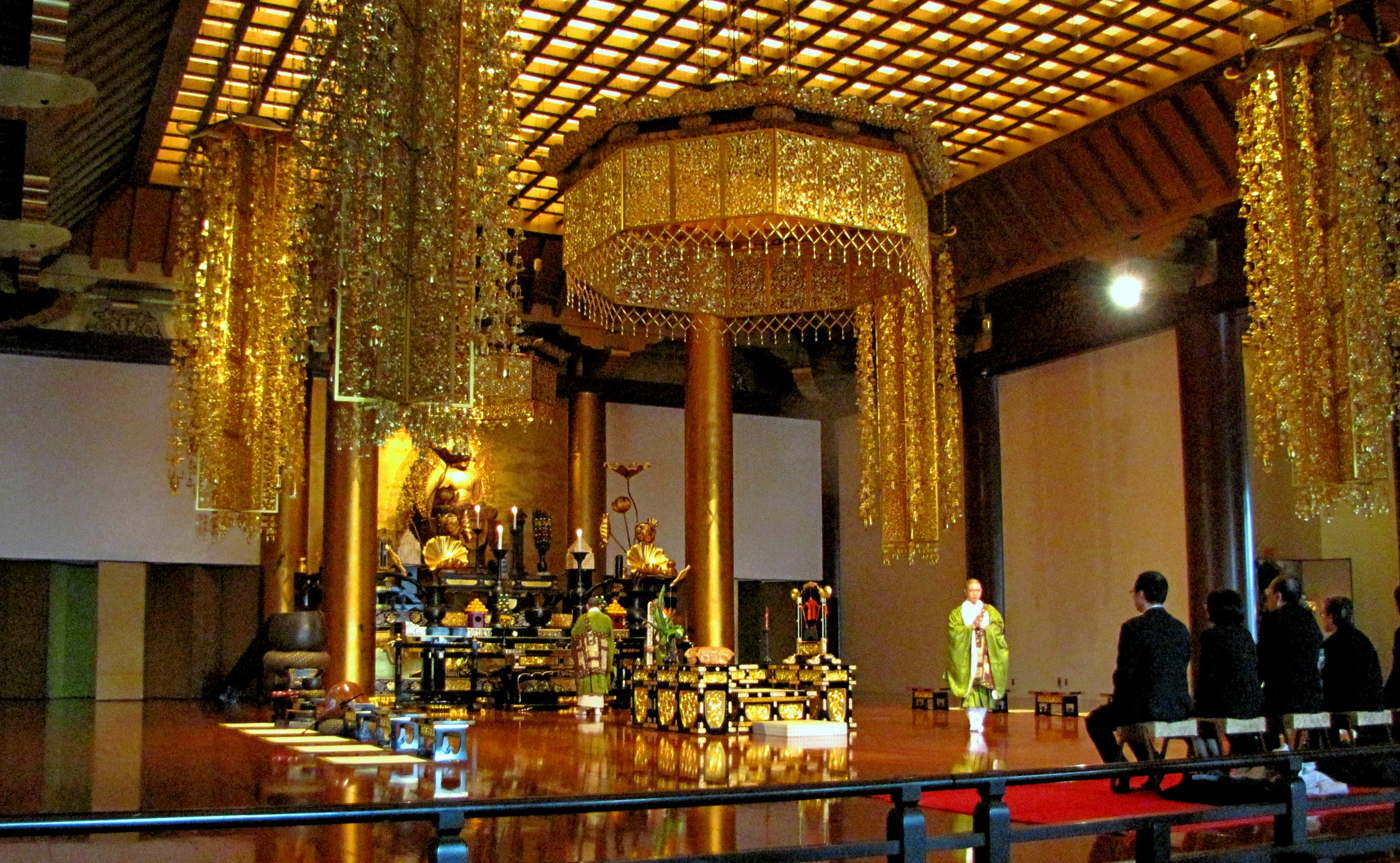

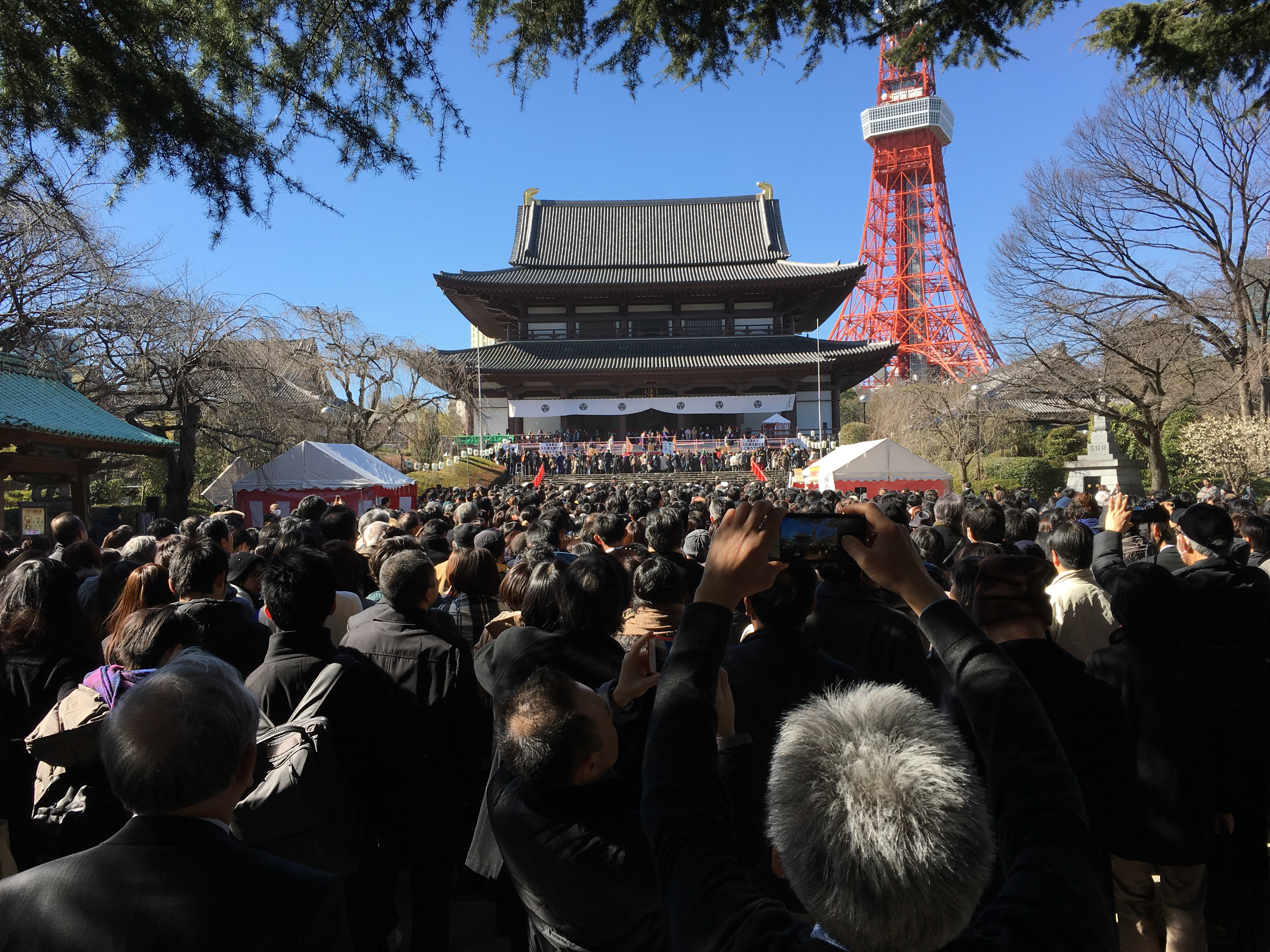
Setsubun

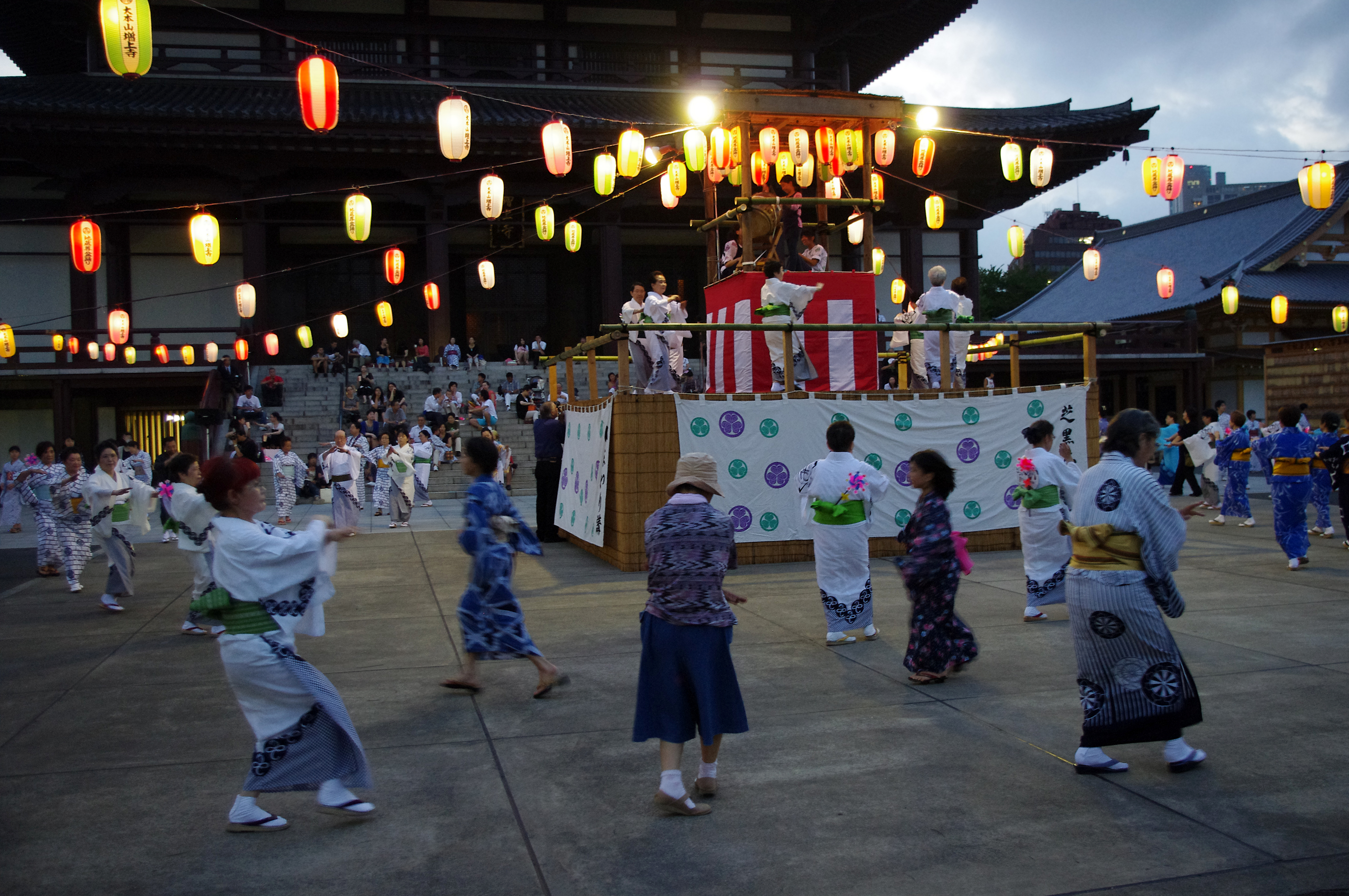
Bon Festival

=== Sangedatsumon ===
The 21 meter (69 foot), two-storied main gate or sangedatsumon (三解脱門) was constructed in 1622, and it is therefore the oldest wooden building in Tokyo. The temple's only original structure to survive the Second World War, it has been designated an Important Cultural Property.

"San" (三) means "three", and "Gedatsu" (解脱) means "Moksha". If someone passes through the gate, he can free himself from three passions (貪 Ton; "greed", 瞋 Shin; "hatred", 癡 Chi; "foolishness").

On the upper floor are enshrined an image of Gautama Buddha flanked by two attendants, and statues of the Sixteen Arhats.

=== Mausoleum of Tokugawa Shōguns ===
Six of the 15 Tokugawa shōguns are buried at Zōjō-ji. The Taitoku-in Mausoleum of Hidetada (and the monument to his wife Sūgen'in), Ienobu, and Ietsugu had been designated National Treasures of Japan, but were burned in World War II. At present, parts of two of their graves have the distinction of being Important Cultural Properties of Japan. Additional graves are located in the cemetery behind the Great Hall. Parts of the former grounds of the temple are now occupied by a park and two hotels. Tokugawa Iemochi also Iemochi's wife, Kazu-no-Miya Chikako also buried in Zozo-ji. Most of the buildings were destroyed in an air raid in 1945 (Showa 20). The tombs, which were located on the north and south sides, were subsequently consolidated into one place and reinterred at their current location.

Interred at Zojo-ji Temple are six shoguns: the 2nd Hidetada, the 6th Ienobu, the 7th Ietsugu, the 9th Ieshige, the 12th Ieyoshi, and the 14th Iemochi, as well as five lawful wives, including Sugen-in (wife of the 2nd Hidetada) and Princess Kazunomiya (wife of the 14th Iemochi). The joint tomb enshrines the children of past shoguns, including the 3rd shogun Iemitsu's concubine Keishoin (the biological mother of the 5th shogun Tsunayoshi), five other concubines, the 3rd shogun Iemitsu's third son, Kofu Chancellor Tsunashige, and other children of past shoguns.

=== Sentai Kosodate Jizō (Unborn Children Garden) ===
In one particular garden at the cemetery, rows of stone statues of children represent unborn children, including miscarried, aborted, and stillborn children. Parents can choose a statue in the garden and decorate it with small clothing and toys. Usually the statues are accompanied by a small gift for Jizō, the guardian of unborn children, to ensure that they are brought to the afterlife. Occasionally stones are piled by the statue; this is meant to ease the journey to the afterlife.

=== Other structures ===
- Daiden (Great Hall) 1974
- Ankokuden - (Pilgrimage Hall) is a prayer hall at Zojoji Temple. Its principal image is the "Black Honzon" (Black Principal Image), said to grant good fortune and ward off evil. This statue, said to have been created by Eshin Sozu, was a personal Buddhist image carried by Tokugawa Ieyasu at all times to pray for victory in battles. Its name comes from its blackened appearance due to years of incense smoke. The Ankokuden was built in 1974, replacing the former main hall, and was rebuilt in 2011 to commemorate the 800th anniversary of the death of Saint [Hōnen]. Inside, the hall houses the standing Amida Buddha, a portrait of Tokugawa Ieyasu, memorial tablets of past shoguns, and a statue of Princess Kazunomiya. The Black Honzon is unveiled three times a year on the "Shogokyu" (59th day of the lunar calendar), and many worshippers attend the prayer service.
- Sutra Repository.
- Treasures Gallery - In April 2015, a treasure exhibition room opened on the first basement floor of the main hall to commemorate the 400th anniversary of the death of Tokugawa Ieyasu. The centerpiece of the exhibit is a 1/10 scale architectural model of the Daitokuin Mausoleum, which was once constructed on the right side of Zojoji Temple's grounds (near the Tokyo Prince Hotel). Also worth seeing is the 500 Arhats by Kano Kazunobu. The Arhat Hall was burned down during the war, but all 100 scrolls of the 500 Arhats survived. Ten scrolls at a time have been exhibited one after another. Each scroll depicts five of the 500 Arhats, each with vibrant expressions that are truly captivating.
- Daibonshō (大梵鐘) - The large bonshō bell is a traditional bell found in Buddhist temples across Japan. It was completed in 1673 after at least seven tries casting the bell. The bell measures 1.76 m wide and 3.33 m tall and weighs 15 tons. It is rung six times in the early morning and six times in the evening to mark six o'clock and to purify earthly passions.
- Enko Daishi Hall
- Koshoden

== Access ==
There is no admission fee for visitors to enter the temple complex. For the Treasure Gallery museum the access fee is 700 yen (as of 2024).

Hondo with Tokyo Tower in the background in 2026.

The entrance is at a 10-minute walk from Hamamatsucho Station on the JR Yamanote and Keihin-Tōhoku Lines, a 6-minute walk from Daimon Station on the Toei Asakusa and Toei Oedo Lines, a 3-minute walk from Onarimon and Shibakoen Stations on the Toei Mita Line, and about 500 meters from the Shibakoen exit of the Shuto Expressway.

While not immediately obvious, the temple grounds are somewhat wheelchair-accessible if entering from the side street instead of the main gate.

== Annual events ==
- Hatsumōde (New Year's visit) January
- Kurohonzon Prayer Ceremony, 15 January
- Setsubun Tsuina-shiki / Nehan Ceremony (Nirvana Day) February
- Spring Higan Ceremony, March
- Gyoki Ceremony / Buddha's Birthday (Flower Festival) April
- Kurohonzon Prayer Ceremony, 15 May
- O-bon / Kaisan-ki / Bon Odori, July
- Peace Prayer Ceremony, August
- Autumn Higan Ceremony / Takigi Noh, September
- Kurohonzon Prayer Ceremony, 15 September
- Juya Hoyo (Ten Nights of Prayer) November
- Jodo Ceremony (Bodhi Day) / Butsumyo Ceremony / Joya no Kane (New Year's Eve Bell Ringing) December

Monthly events

- Sutra copying, 14th (except July and August)
- Betsuji Nembutsu, 24th

== Popular culture ==
Zōjō-ji was depicted multiple times in the art work of the Shin hanga artist Kawase Hasui during the 1920s and 30s. It was also shown in several ukiyo-e prints by Hiroshige, in particular twice in his famous One Hundred Famous Views of Edo series from 1856–1858.

Zōjō-ji in ukiyo-e

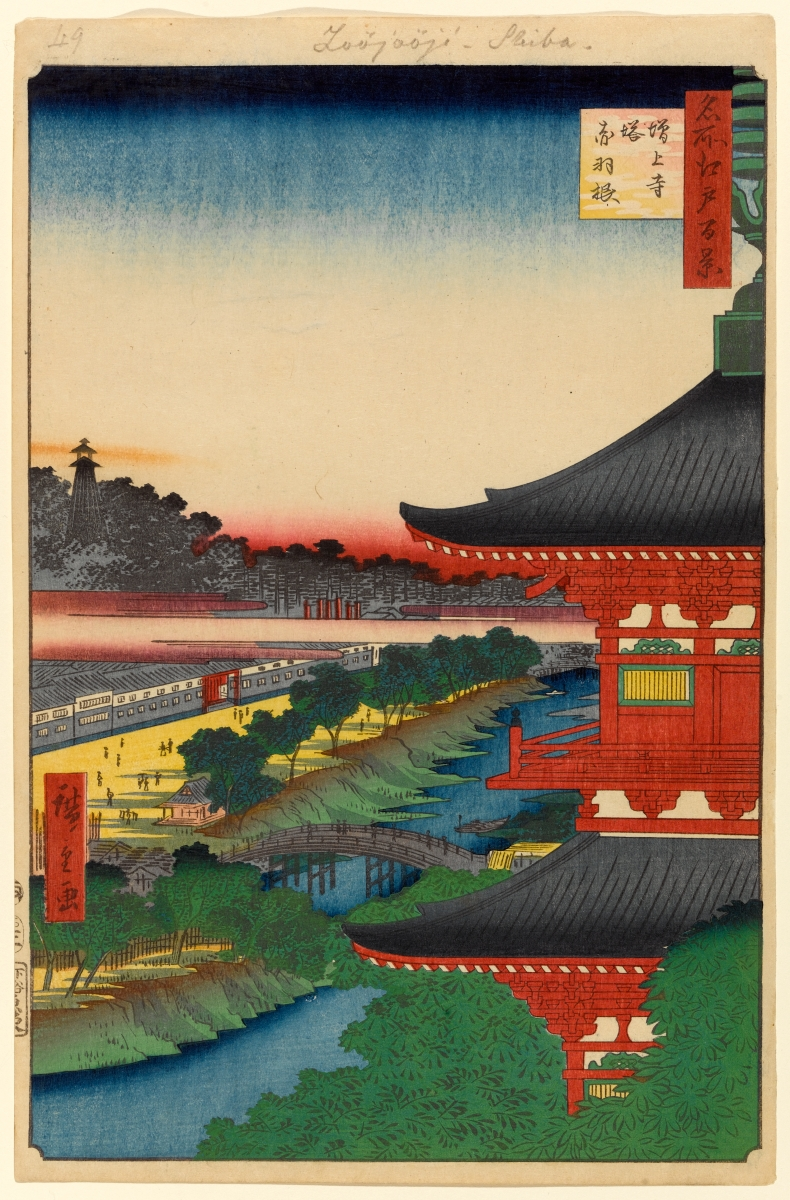
Zojoji Pagoda and Akabane (1857) by Hiroshige

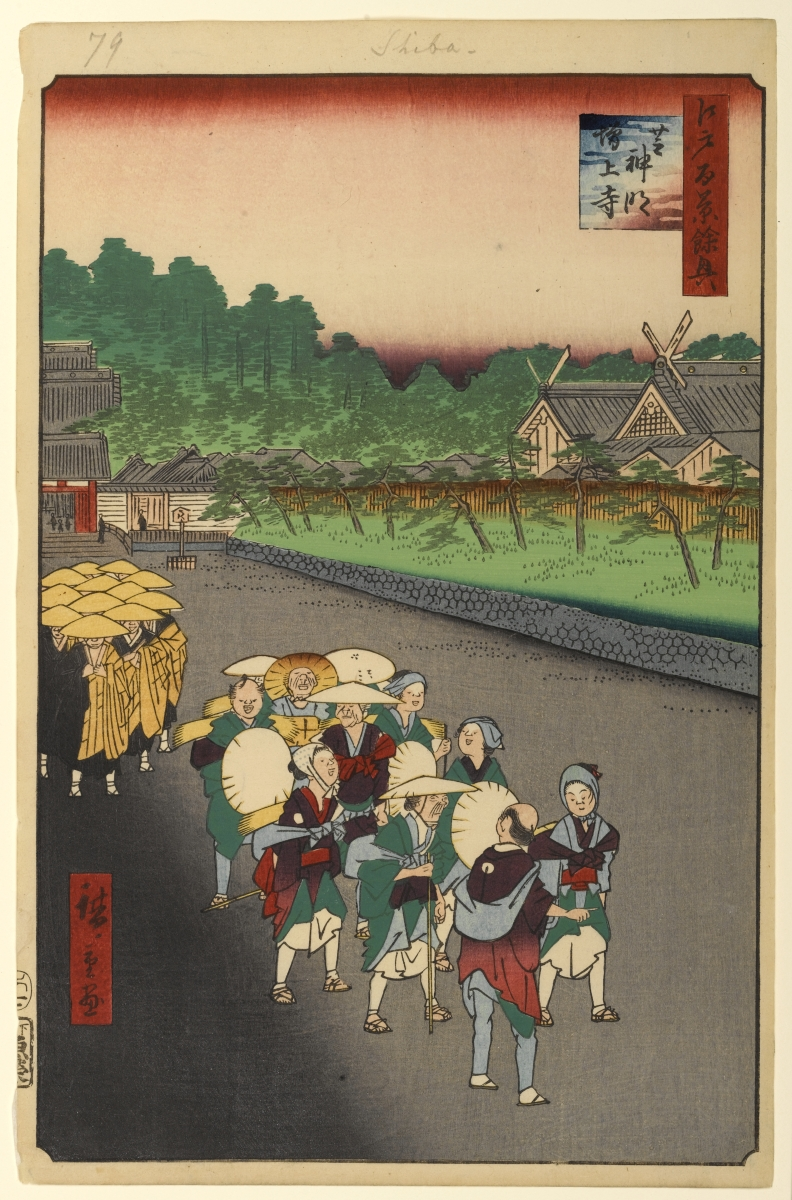
Shiba Shinmei Shrine and Zojoji Temple (1857) by Hiroshige

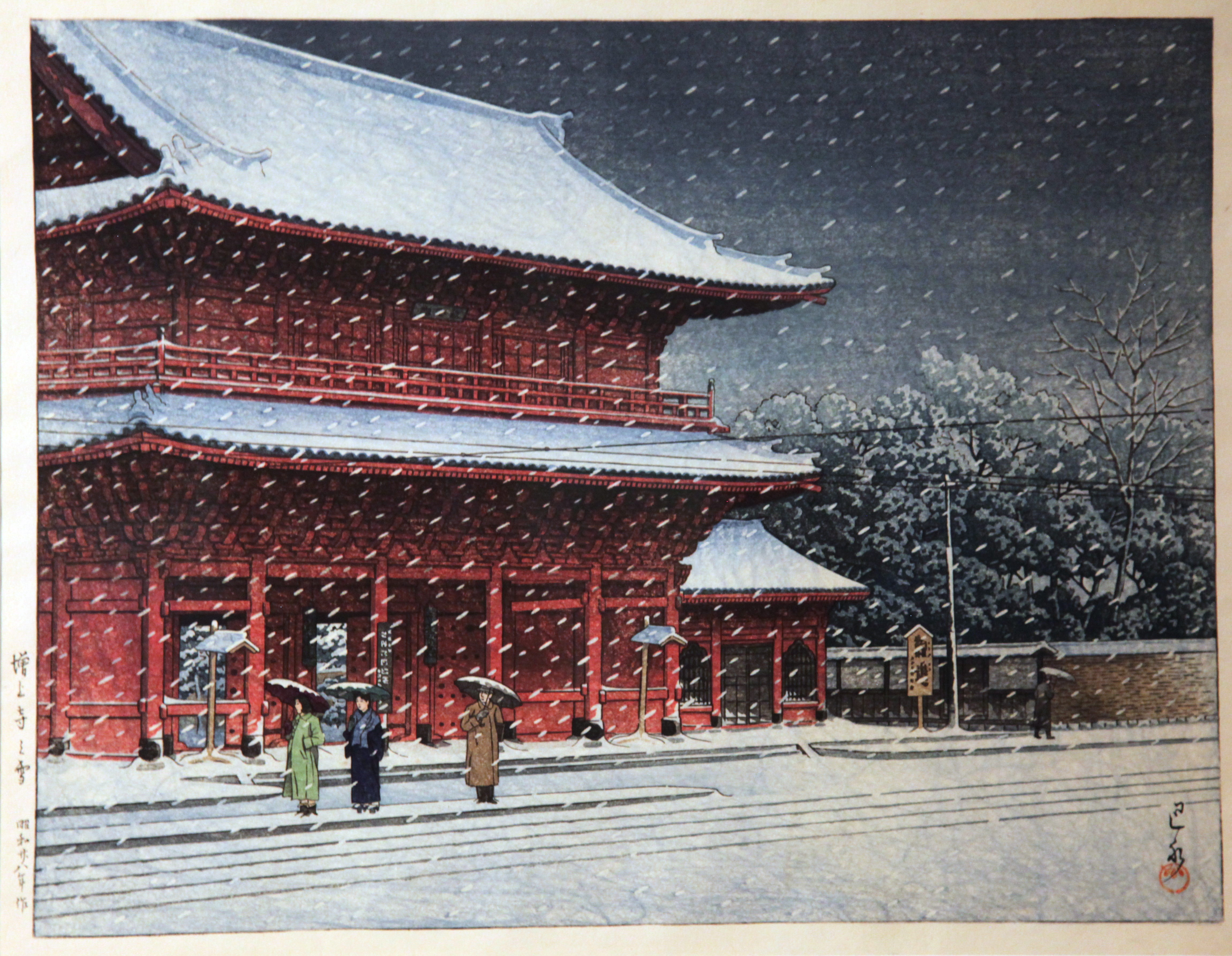
Snow over Zojoji Temple (1921) by Hasui Kawase

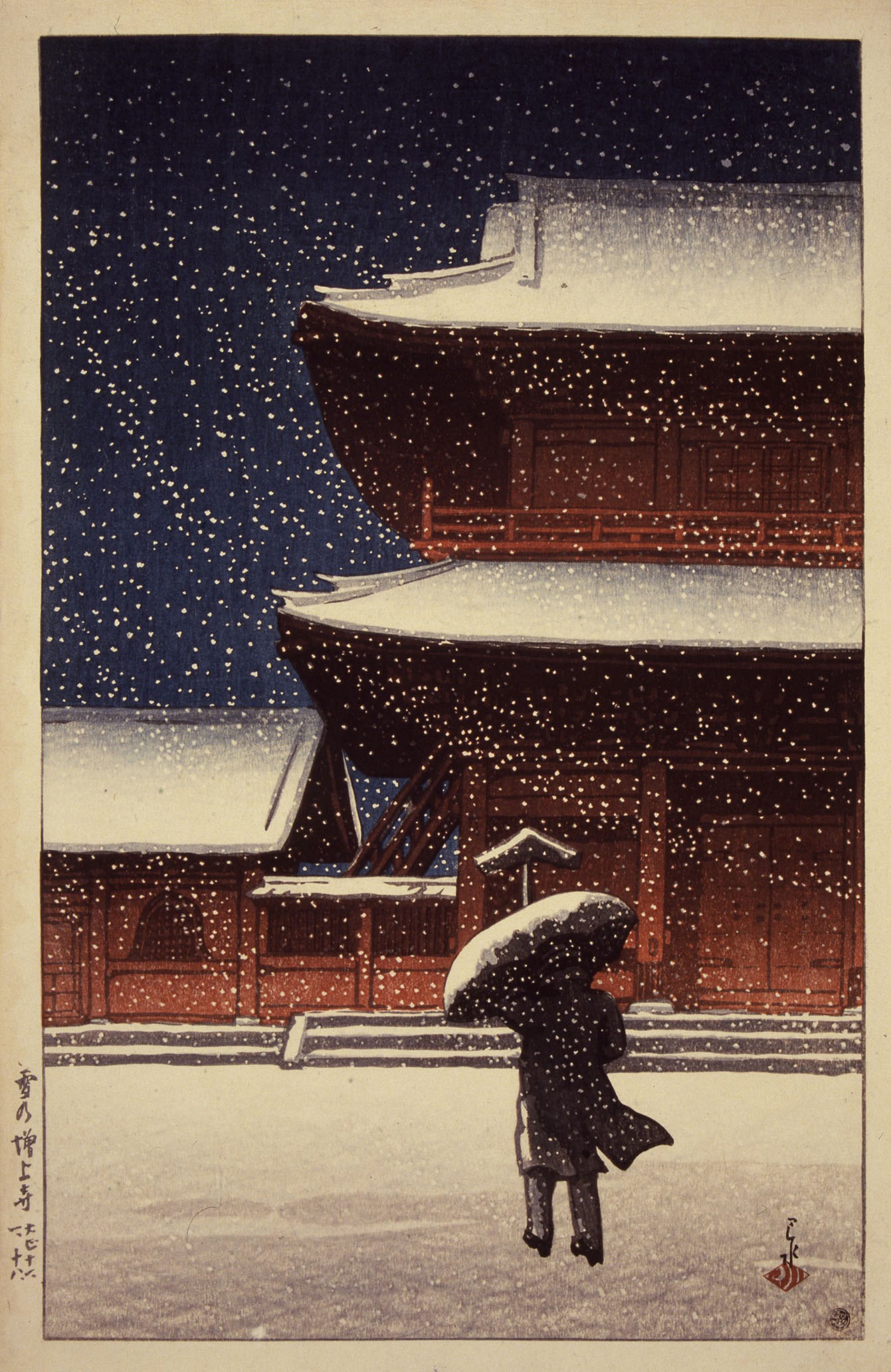
Snow at Zōjō Temple (1922) by Hasui Kawase

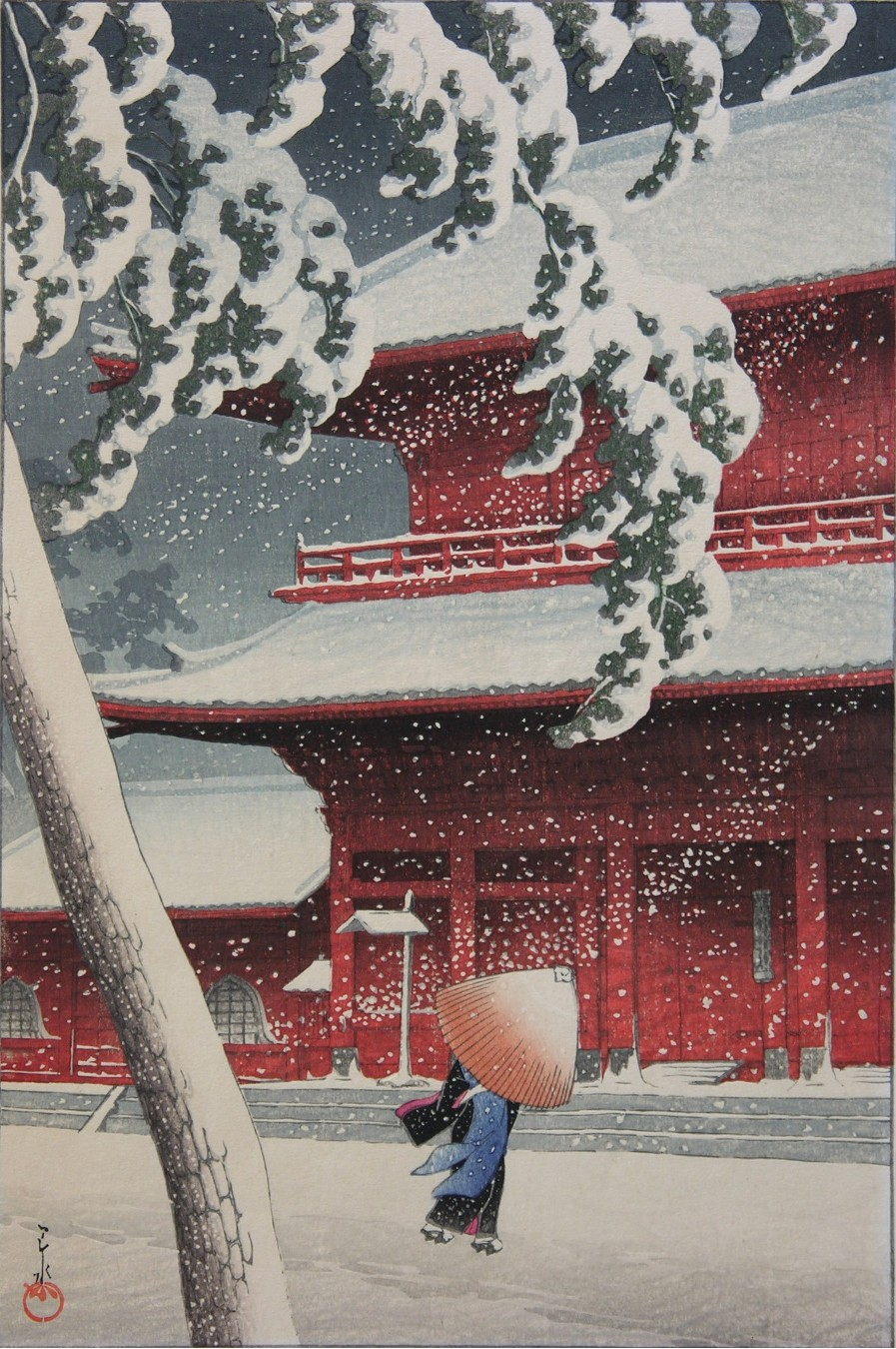
Zōjō-ji in Shiba (1925) by Hasui Kawase

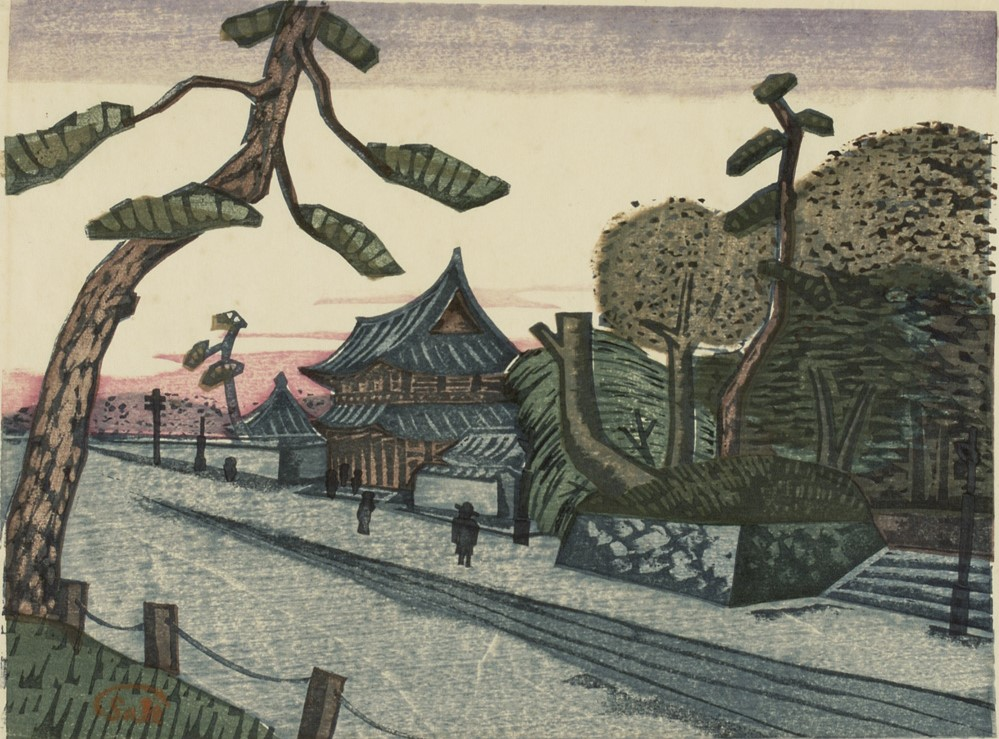
Zôjô-ji (1929) by Fukazawa Sakuichi

== See also ==
- Kenchū-ji in Nagoya
- Glossary of Japanese Buddhism
