= Shibakoen Station =

Metro station in Tokyo, Japan

Coordinates: 35.6543°N 139.7499°E

Shibakoen Station 芝公園駅

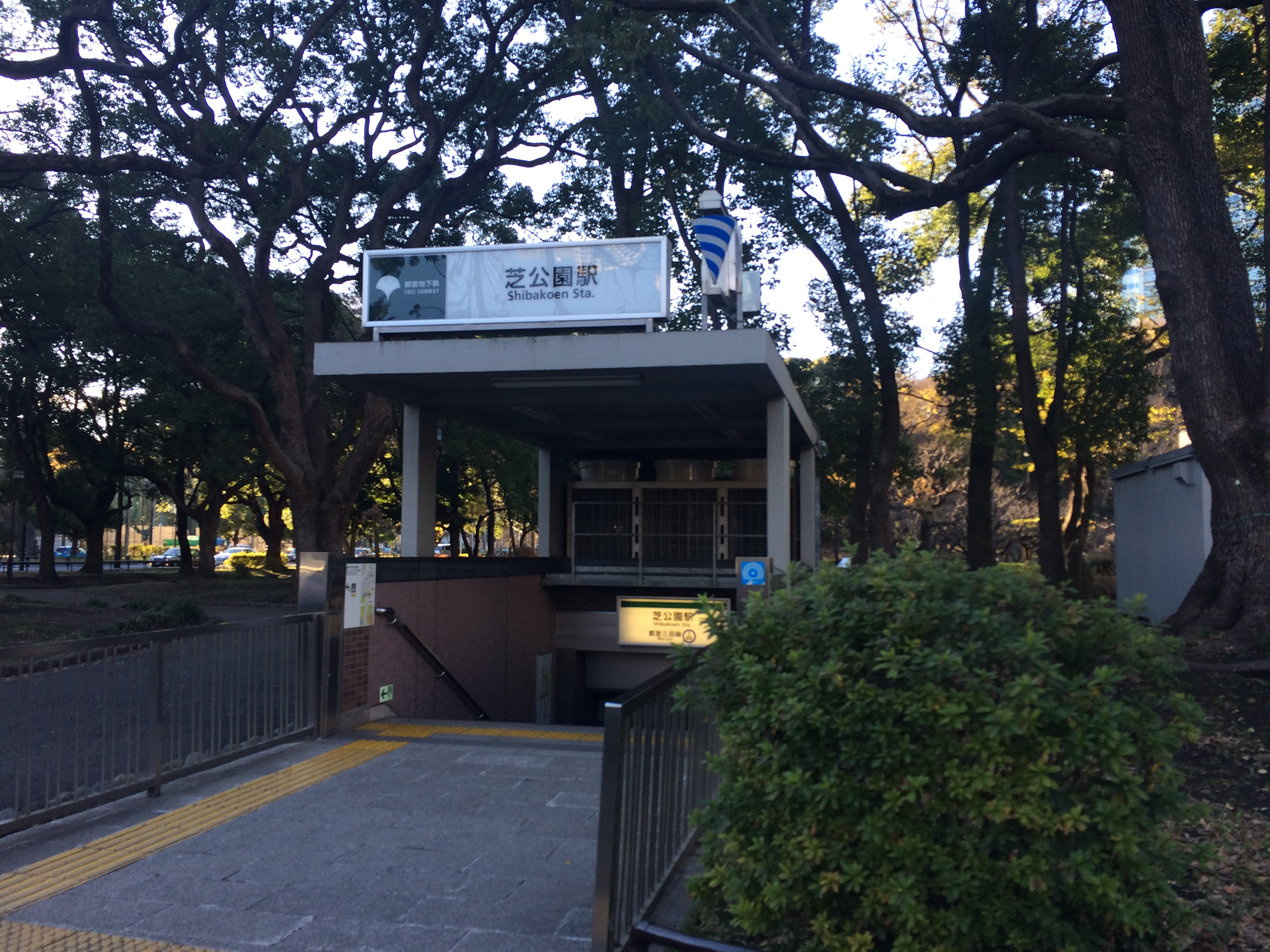
- Entrance A4 in 2016

General information
- Location: 4-8-14 Shibakoen, Minato City, Tokyo 105-0011; Japan
- Operator: Toei Subway
- Line: Mita Line
- Distance: 4.6 km (2.9 mi) from Meguro
- Platforms: 2 side platforms
- Tracks: 2

Construction
- Structure type: Underground

Other information
- Station code: I-05
- Website: Official website

History
- Opened: 27 November 1973; 52 years ago

Passengers
- FY2011: 26,107 daily

Services
Preceding station	Toei Subway	Following station
Mita towards Meguro	Mita Line	Onarimon towards Nishi-takashimadaira
Location
- Location within Tokyo Yamanote Loop Location within Tokyo wards area Location within Japan

Shibakoen Station (芝公園駅, Shibakōen-eki; lit. "Shiba Park Station") is a subway station on the Toei Mita Line in Minato, Tokyo, Japan, operated by the Tokyo subway operator Tokyo Metropolitan Bureau of Transportation (Toei).

== Lines ==
Shibakoen Station is served by the Toei Mita Line, and lies 4.6 km from the starting point of the line at Meguro. It is numbered "I-05". It is also relatively close to Akabanebashi Station on the Toei Ōedo Line (located 500 meters to the west), although it is not officially recognized as a transfer station and there is no transfer corridor between the two stations.

== Station layout ==
The station consists of two side platforms serving two tracks on the second basement ("B2F") level.

=== Platforms ===
1
2
Mita Line
Mita Line
- for Shirokane-takanawa and Meguro
- Meguro Line for Musashi-Kosugi and Hiyoshi
- Sotetsu Main Line for Ebina via the Tokyu/Sotetsu Shin-Yokohama Line
- Sotetsu Izumino Line for Shōnandai via the Tokyu/Sotetsu Shin-Yokohama Line
for Ōtemachi, Sugamo, and Nishi-Takashimadaira

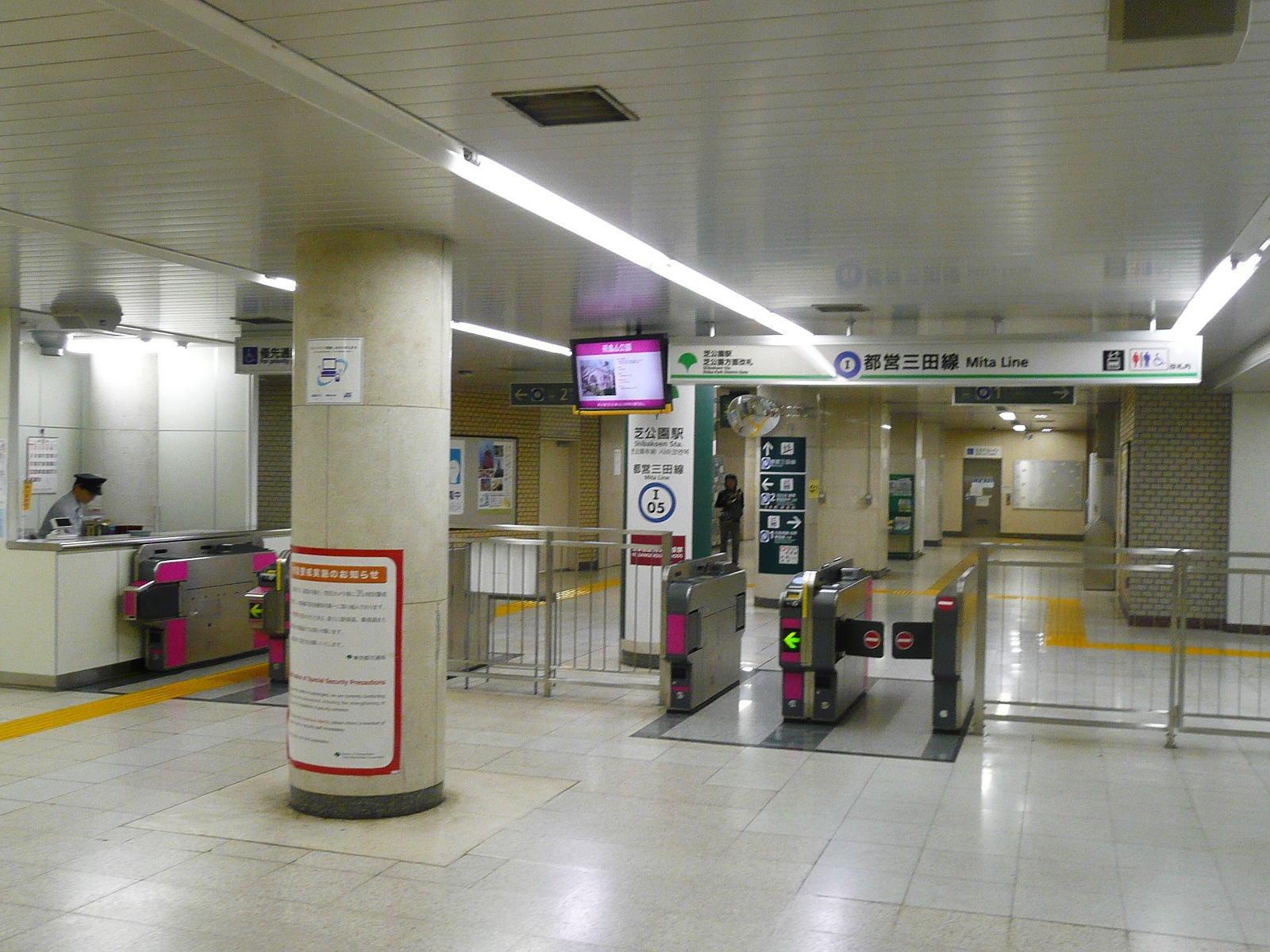
The ticket barriers at the northern end of the station in May 2011

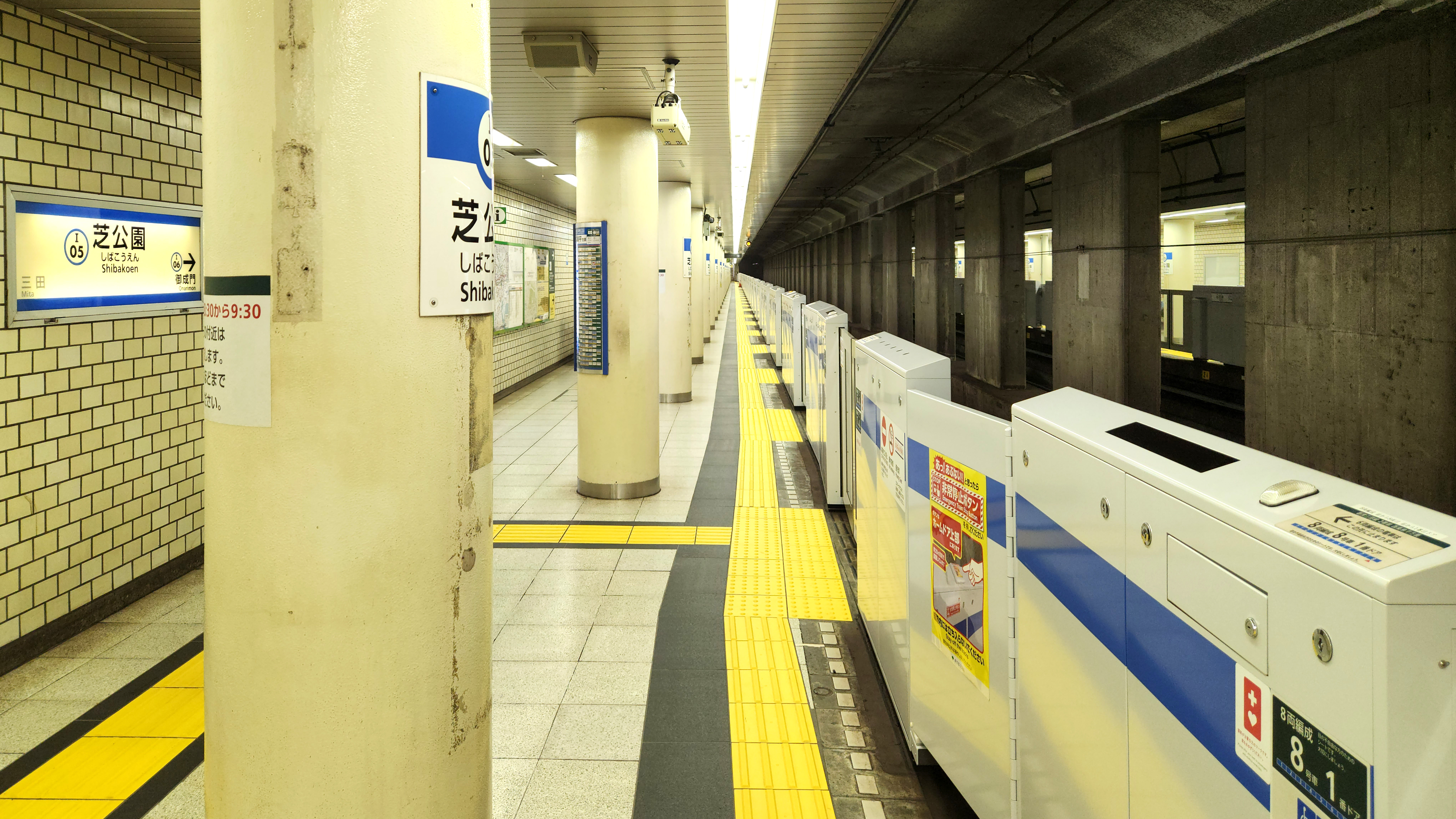
The platforms in September 2023

== History ==
The station opened on 27 November 1973.

== Passenger statistics ==
In fiscal 2011, the station was used by an average of 26,107 passengers daily.

== Surrounding area ==
- Shiba Park
- Jikei University School of Medicine
- Tokyo Tower
- Mielparque Tokyo
- National Route 15

== See also ==
- List of railway stations in Japan
