= Jikei University School of Medicine =

Private university in Tokyo, Japan

- 東京慈恵会医科大学
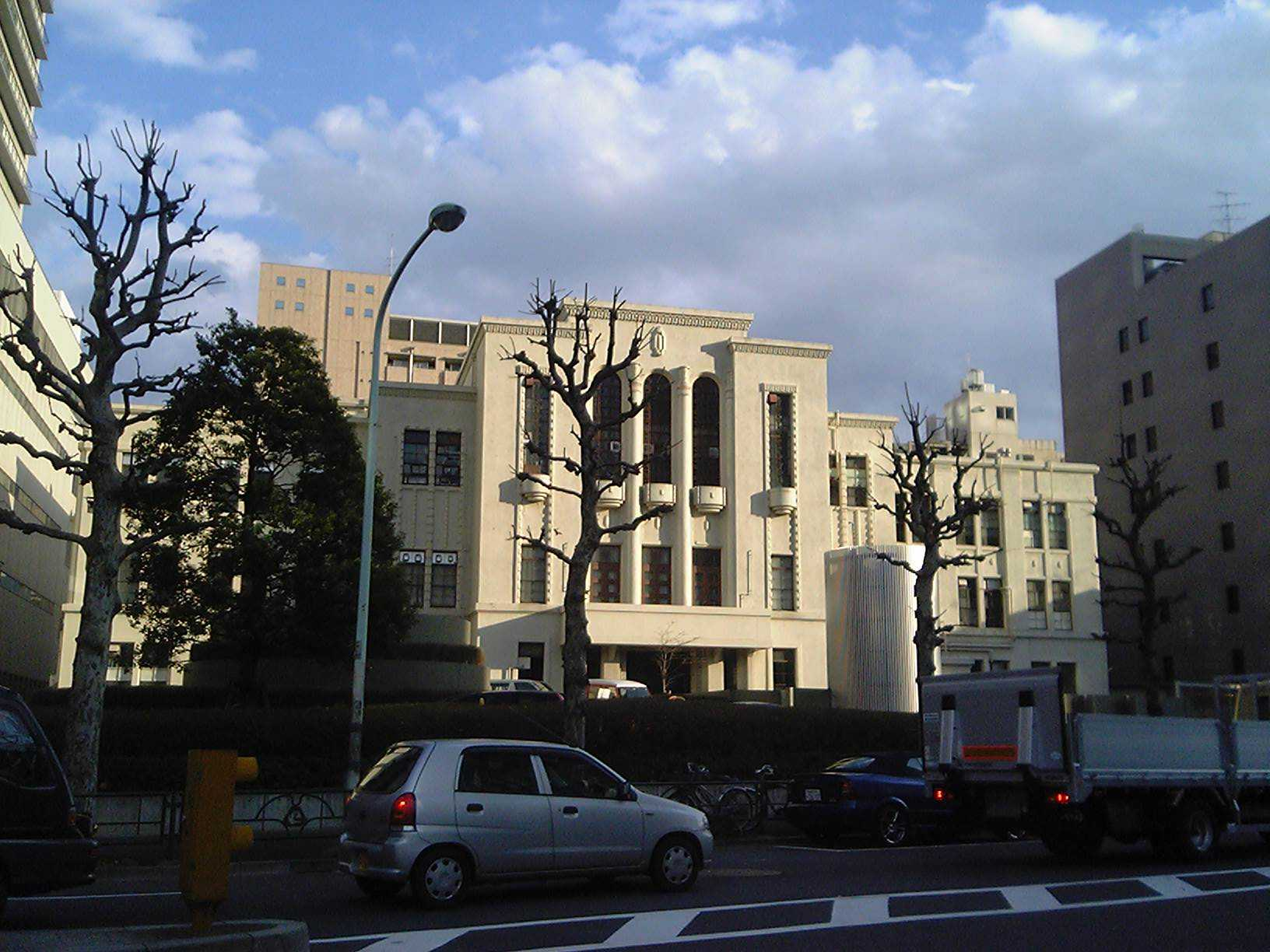
- The Jikei University School of Medicine
- Type: Private university
- Established: 1921
- Location: Minato, Tokyo, Japan
- Campus: Nishi-Shinbashi Campus 35°39′45.9″N 139°45′2.5″E Kokuryō Campus 35°38′43.9″N 139°33′53.3″E
- Website: www.jikei.ac.jp

The Jikei University School of Medicine (東京慈恵会医科大学, Tōkyō jikei kai ika daigaku) is a private university in Minato, Tokyo, Japan. Jikei (慈恵) means mercy and love in Japanese.

== Location ==
The Nishi-Shinbashi Campus is about a 3-minute walk from Onarimon Station and about a 10-minute walk from Uchisaiwaichō Station both on the Toei Mita Line. It is about a 7-minute walk from Kamiyachō Station on the Tokyo Metro Hibiya Line and about a 10-minute walk from Toranomon Station on the Tokyo Metro Ginza Line. The nearest JR station, Shinbashi Station, is about 12 minutes away on foot.

The Kokuryō Campus in Chōfu, Tokyo is about a 10-minute walk from Kokuryō Station on the Keiō Line.
