= Taitoku-in Mausoleum =

Former historic site in Tokyo, Japan

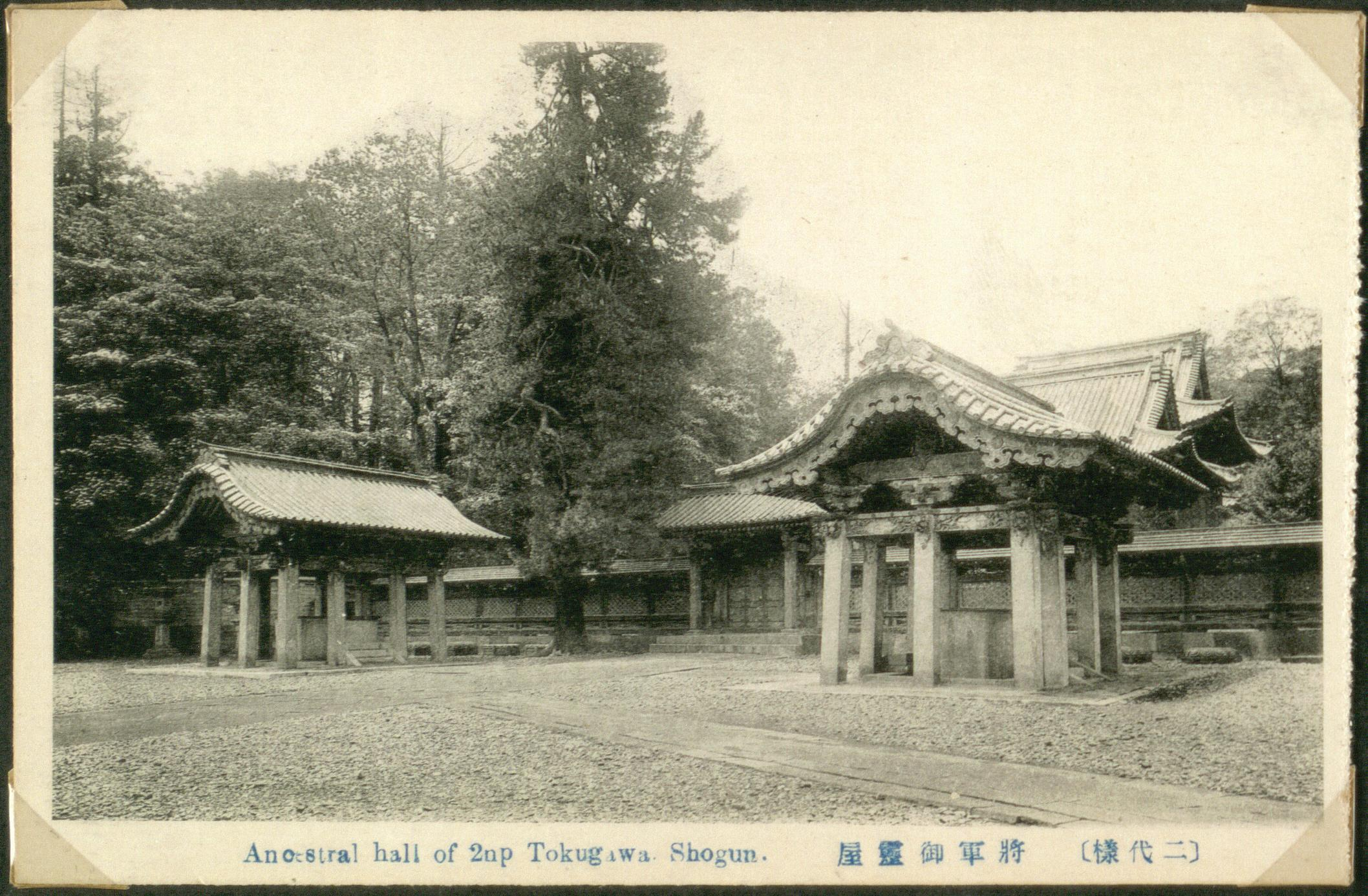
View of the main two halls of the Taitoku-in Mausoleum (before 1945)

The Taitoku-in Mausoleum (台徳院霊廟, Taitokuin Reibyō) was an Edo period mausoleum for Shōgun Tokugawa Hidetada. It was located within the grounds of Zōjō-ji in Tokyo.

The architecture of the mausoleum was sumptuous. It was largely destroyed in the aerial bombardments of World War II.

== History ==
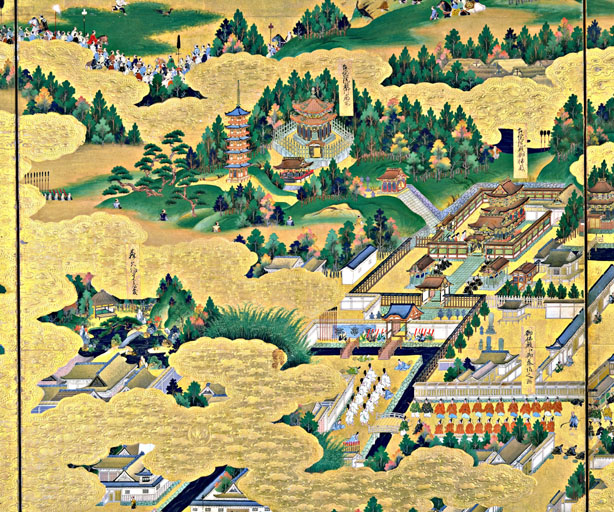
Shōgun Iemitsu visiting Taitoku-in Mausoleum, as depicted in the Edo-zu byōbu screens (17th century)

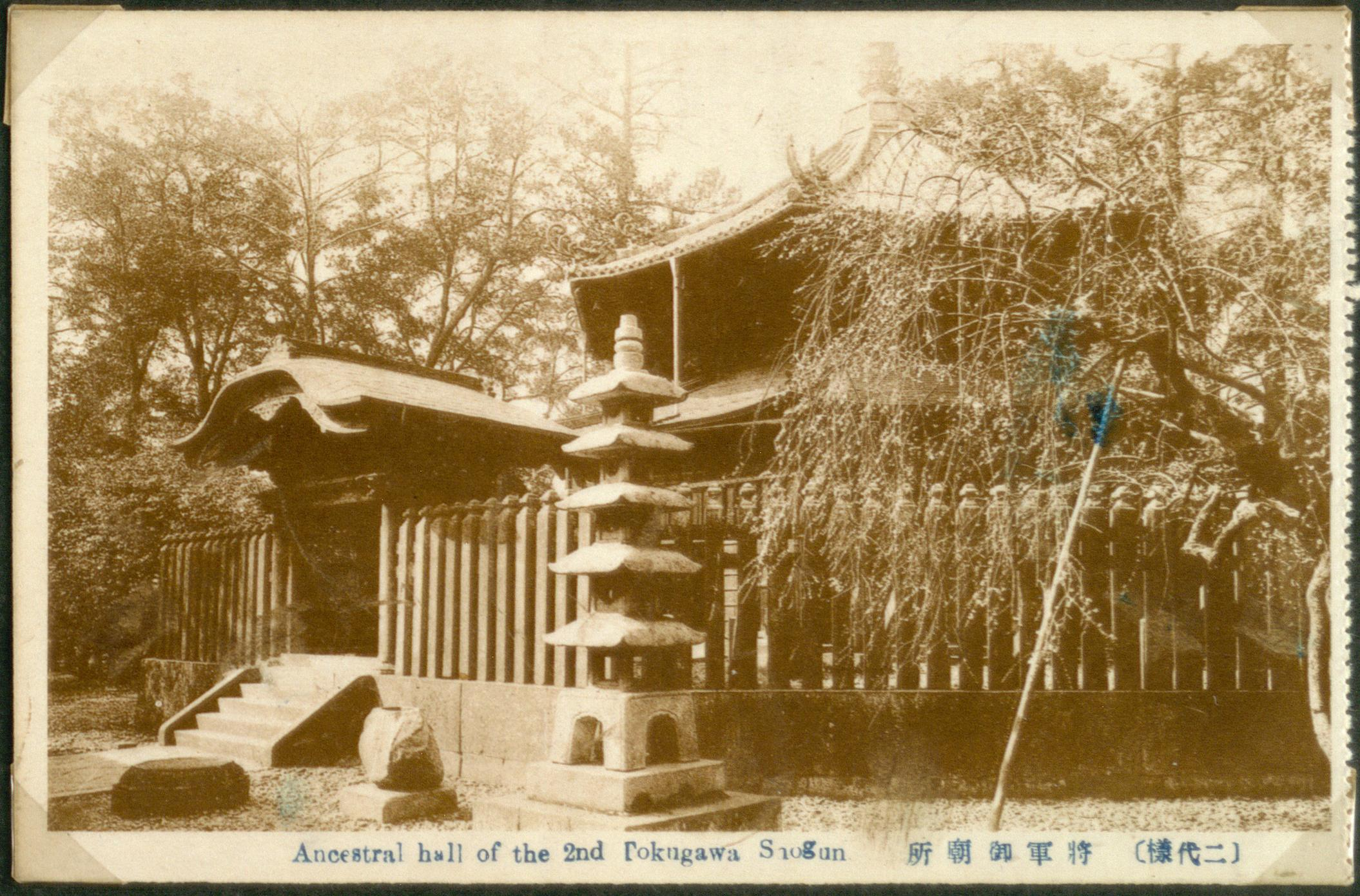
Minor hall (before 1945)

The mausoleum was constructed for Tokugawa Hidetada, who died in 1632. His Buddhist posthumous name is Taitoku-in. The location was in the southern part of Zojo-ji. The main construction took around six months and was made largely with wood.

The complex with its 15 structures was listed as a National Treasure in May 1930. The Tokyo air raids of May 1945 destroyed most of the structures. The ashes of the shōgun were reburied in 1958.

== Architecture ==
The complex consisted of various gates leading into the inner sanctuary where two main buildings and a pagoda stood. Of these, only four buildings survived the war, with damages. Three of these structures were moved to Tokorozawa, Saitama Prefecture in the 1960. The So-mon gate was moved 45 metres to the east of the original location in 1959, to make space for a hotel.

A large miniature model of the main two halls was commissioned by the city of Tokyo for the 1910 Japan–British Exhibition in London. It was given as a gift to King George V and was later displayed at the Royal Botanical Gardens in Kew then dismantled and stored in an obscure location along with other treasures of the Crown. It was restored largely due to the work of Australian Professor William Howard Coaldrake who was invested as a member of the Royal Victorian Order at the behest of Queen Elizabeth II for his work. The model was returned in 2015 to Japan to be shown at a special exhibition at the Zojo-ji temple in Tokyo.

== See also ==
- Kunōzan Tōshō-gū and Nikkō Tōshō-gū
- Kan'ei-ji in Tokyo, site of several Tokugawa mausolea
- Mount Kōya, site of several Tokugawa mausolea
