= Kanō Kazunobu =

Japanese painter

Kanō Kazunobu 狩野 一信
- Born: 1816
- Died: 3 November 1863
- Known for: Painting
- Notable work: Five Hundred Arhats
- Movement: Kanō school

Kanō Kazunobu (狩野 一信, 1816 – November 3, 1863) was a Japanese painter of the Kanō school.

Kazunobu produced mainly Buddhist paintings and he is best known for his highly acclaimed Five Hundred Arhats. Some of his other surviving works are housed at the Senso-ji temple in Asakusa and the Shinshō-ji temple in Narita.

He did not use the surname Kanō during his life, but rather signed with his wife's surname as Henmi Kazunobu (逸見一信) or with the art name Ken'yūsai Kazunobu (顕幽斎一信).

== Works ==
Five Hundred Arhats (五百羅漢図) is a set of 100 hanging scrolls created between 1854 and 1863, the year Kazunobu's death. The work depicts one hundred scenes from the lives of five arhats, disciples of the Buddha. It is widely considered one of the most important religious paintings from the Edo period, variously praised by its "unique style" and "strong characters in thick colors" and its "visually disturbing, original interpretation of the subject".

It was commissioned by the Zōjō-ji temple in Edo, the Tokugawa-sponsored main temple of the Jōdo-shū buddhist sect, to which it now belong.

Kazunobu's Five Hundred Arhats was mostly overlooked through the twentieth century but it has attracted attention in recent years, with an exhibition of 2 of the scrolls in 2006 at the Tokyo National Museum, and the first ever exhibition of the complete set in 2011 at the Edo-Tokyo Museum. As of 2017, a changing set of 10 scrolls is displayed in the Zōjō-ji Treasure Gallery.

Five Hundred Arhats (selection)

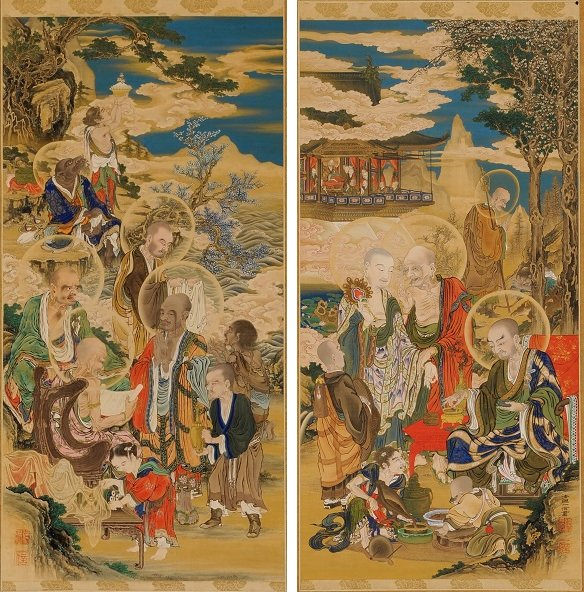
scrolls 1 & 2

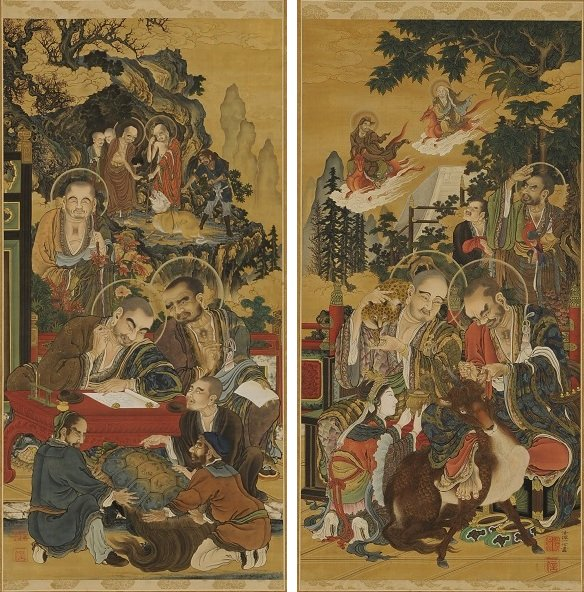
scrolls 61 & 62

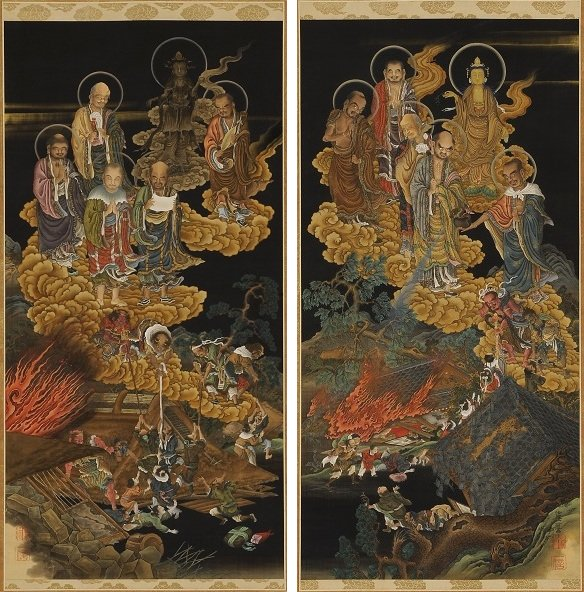
scrolls 81 & 82

A second set of 50 scrolls of Five Hundred Arhats (五百羅漢図) is owned by the Tokyo National Museum. Perhaps a test for the final version, each scroll is about a quarter of the size of the Zōjō-ji version, and it includes two scenes instead of one. The work was exhibited in its entirety in 2006.
