= Uchisaiwaicho Station =

Metro station in Tokyo, Japan

Coordinates: 35.6696°N 139.7559°E

Uchisaiwaicho Station 内幸町駅

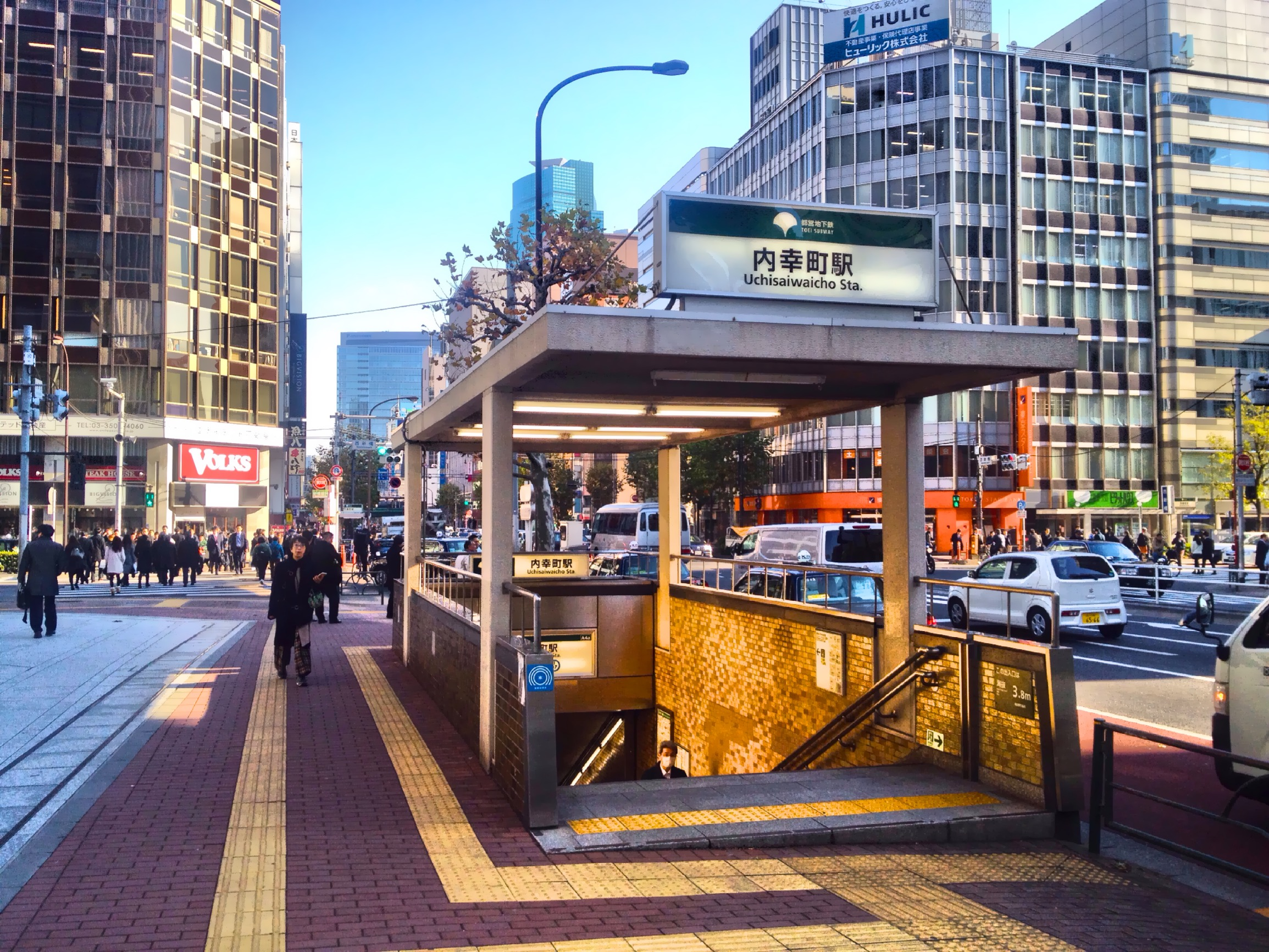
- Station entrance

General information
- Location: 2 Chome-2-3 Uchisaiwaichō, Chiyoda City, Tokyo; Japan
- Operator: Toei Subway
- Line: Mita Line
- Platforms: 1 island platform
- Tracks: 2

Construction
- Structure type: Underground

Other information
- Station code: I-07

History
- Opened: 27 November 1973; 52 years ago

Services
Preceding station	Toei Subway	Following station
Onarimon towards Meguro	Mita Line	Hibiya towards Nishi-takashimadaira
Location
- Location within Tokyo Yamanote Loop Location within Tokyo wards area Location within Japan

Uchisaiwaicho Station (内幸町駅, Uchisaiwaichō-eki) is a railway station on the Toei Mita Line in Uchisaiwaichō, Chiyoda, Tokyo, Japan. Its station number is I-07.

== Lines ==
Uchisaiwaicho Station is served by the Toei Mita Line, and lies 6.4 km from the starting point of the line at Meguro. It is numbered "I-07". It is also relatively close to Shimbashi Station on the Tokyo Metro Ginza Line and Toei Asakusa Line (located 230 meters to the southeast), although it is not officially recognized as a transfer station and there is no transfer corridor between the two stations.

== Station layout ==
The station consists of a single island platform serving two tracks.

=== Platforms ===
1
2
Mita Line
Mita Line
- for Shirokane-takanawa and Meguro
- Meguro Line for Musashi-Kosugi and Hiyoshi
- Sotetsu Main Line for Ebina via the Tokyu/Sotetsu Shin-Yokohama Line
- Sotetsu Izumino Line for Shōnandai via the Tokyu/Sotetsu Shin-Yokohama Line
for Ōtemachi, Sugamo, and Nishi-takashimadaira

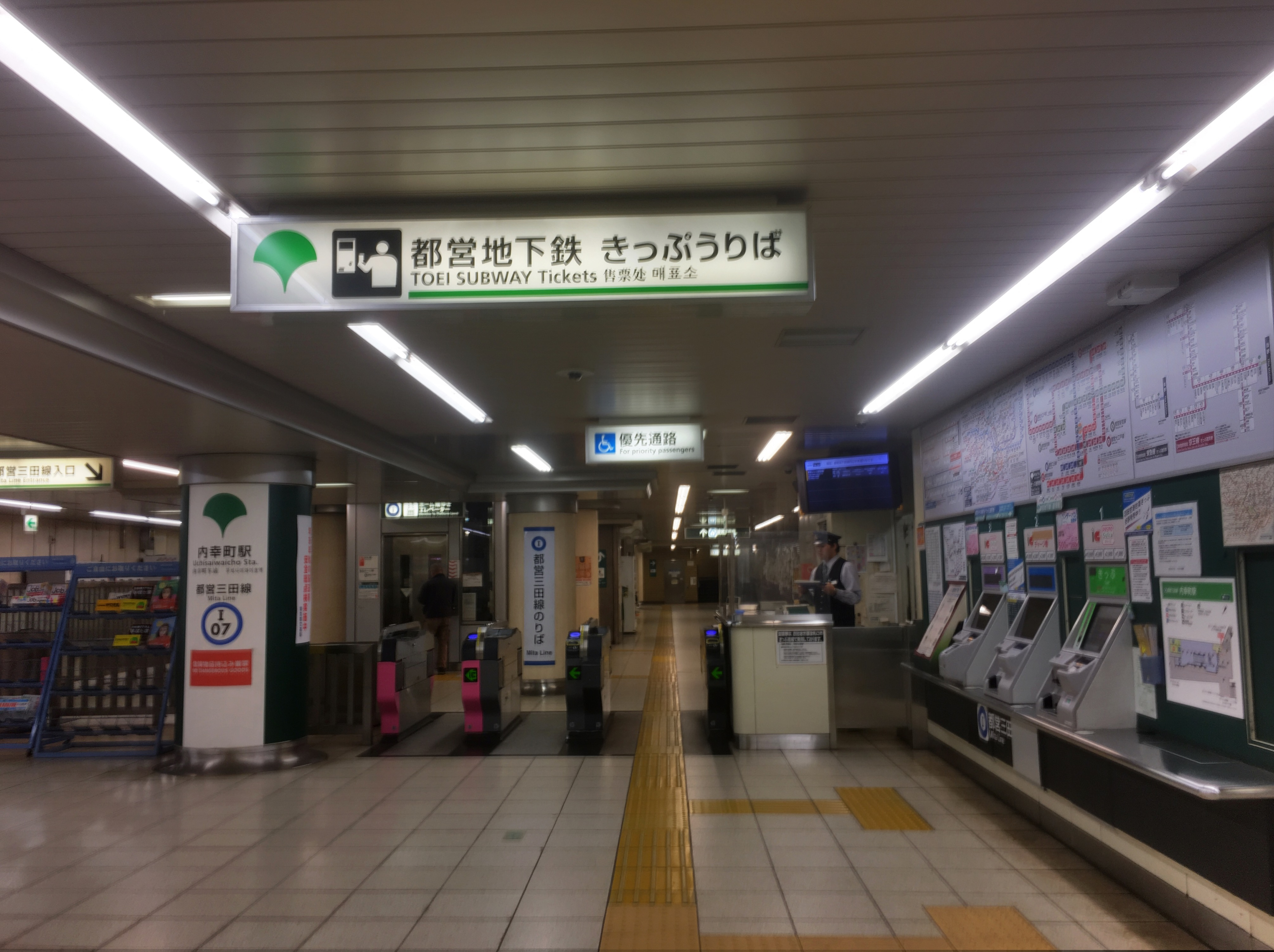
Ticket gates

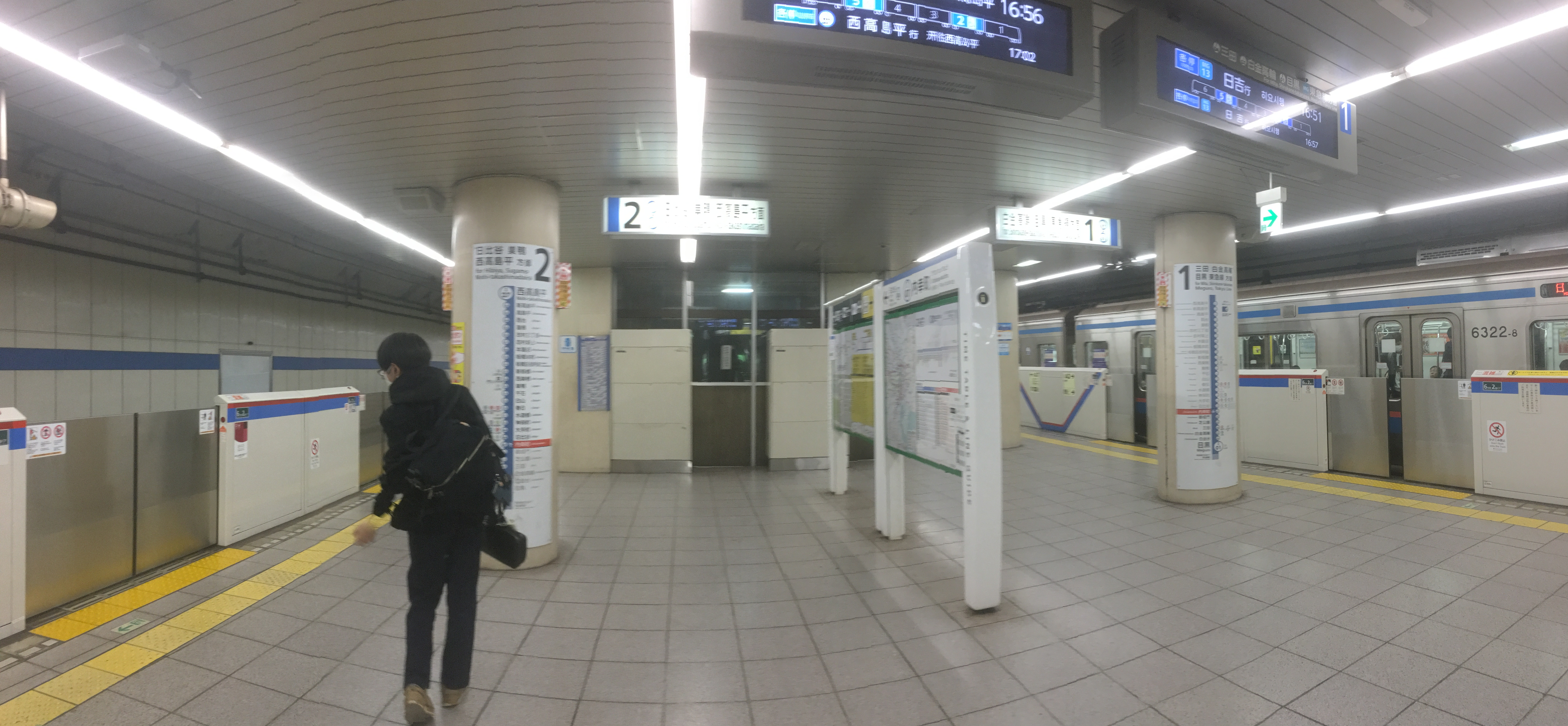
Platforms, 2019

== History ==
The station opened on 27 November 1973.

== Passenger statistics ==
The station saw a daily average of 45,660 passengers in 2018.

== Surroundings ==
- Hibiya Park
- Imperial Hotel
- Mizuho Bank
- Tokyo Electric Power Company
- NTT Communications
- Hankyu Hanshin Hotels
- Shimbashi Station
- Toranomon Station
