= Onarimon Station =

Metro station in Tokyo, Japan

Onarimon Station 御成門駅

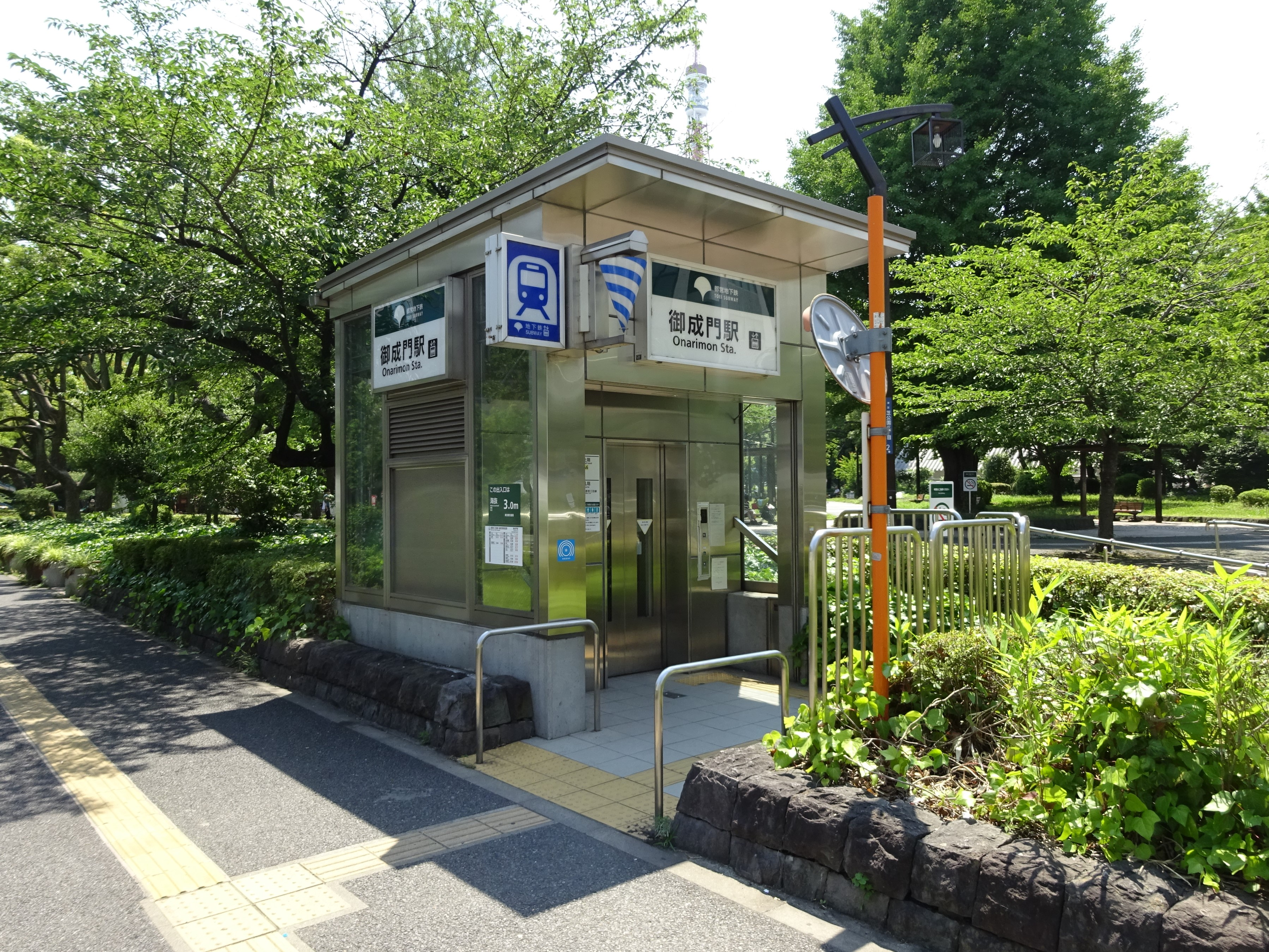
- Entrance A6 in June 2016

General information
- Location: 3-24-6 Nishi-shimbashi, Minato-ku, Tokyo 105-0003; Japan
- Coordinates: 35.6614°N 139.7515°E
- Operator: Toei Subway
- Line: Mita Line
- Platforms: 1 island platform
- Tracks: 2

Construction
- Structure type: Underground
- Accessible: Yes

Other information
- Station code: I-06

History
- Opened: 27 November 1973; 52 years ago

Services
Preceding station	Toei Subway	Following station
Shibakoen towards Meguro	Mita Line	Uchisaiwaicho towards Nishi-takashimadaira
Location
- Location within Tokyo Yamanote Loop Location within Tokyo wards area Location within Japan

Onarimon Station (御成門駅, Onarimon-eki) is a subway station on the Toei Mita Line in Minato, Tokyo, Japan, operated by the Tokyo subway operator Tokyo Metropolitan Bureau of Transportation (Toei).

== Lines ==
Onarimon Station is served by the Toei Mita Line, and is numbered "I-06".

== Station layout ==
The station has one island platform serving two tracks on the second basement ("B2F") level.

1
2
Mita Line
Mita Line
- for Shirokane-takanawa and Meguro
- Meguro Line for Musashi-Kosugi and Hiyoshi
- Sotetsu Main Line for Ebina via the Tokyu/Sotetsu Shin-Yokohama Line
- Sotetsu Izumino Line for Shōnandai via the Tokyu/Sotetsu Shin-Yokohama Line
for Ōtemachi, Sugamo, and Nishi-Takashimadaira

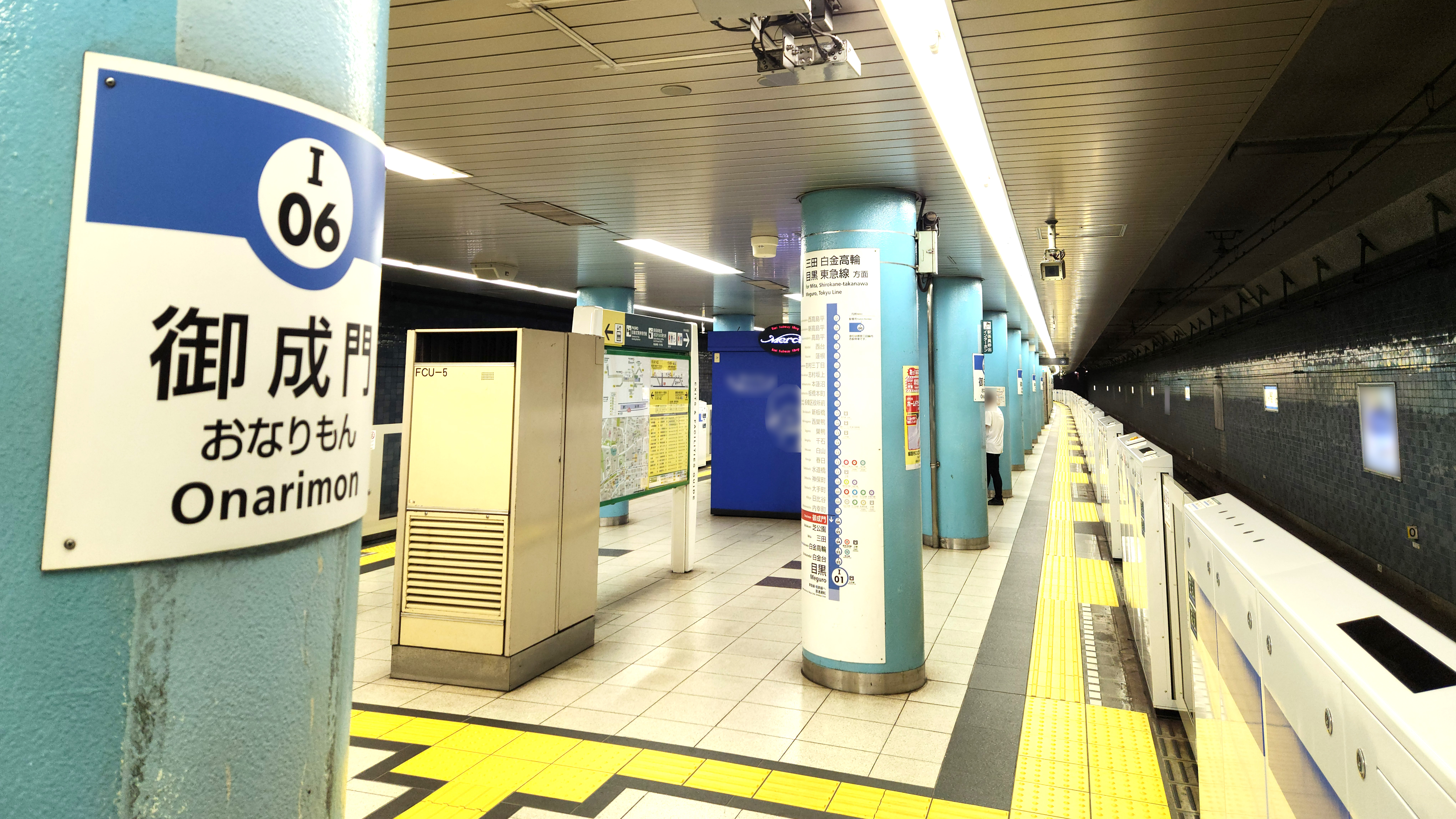
The platform in August 2024

== History ==
The station opened on 27 November 1973.

== See also ==
- List of railway stations in Japan
