= Oeyo =

Historical Japanese figure (1573–1626)

Ōmidaidokoro 於江与 Oeyo
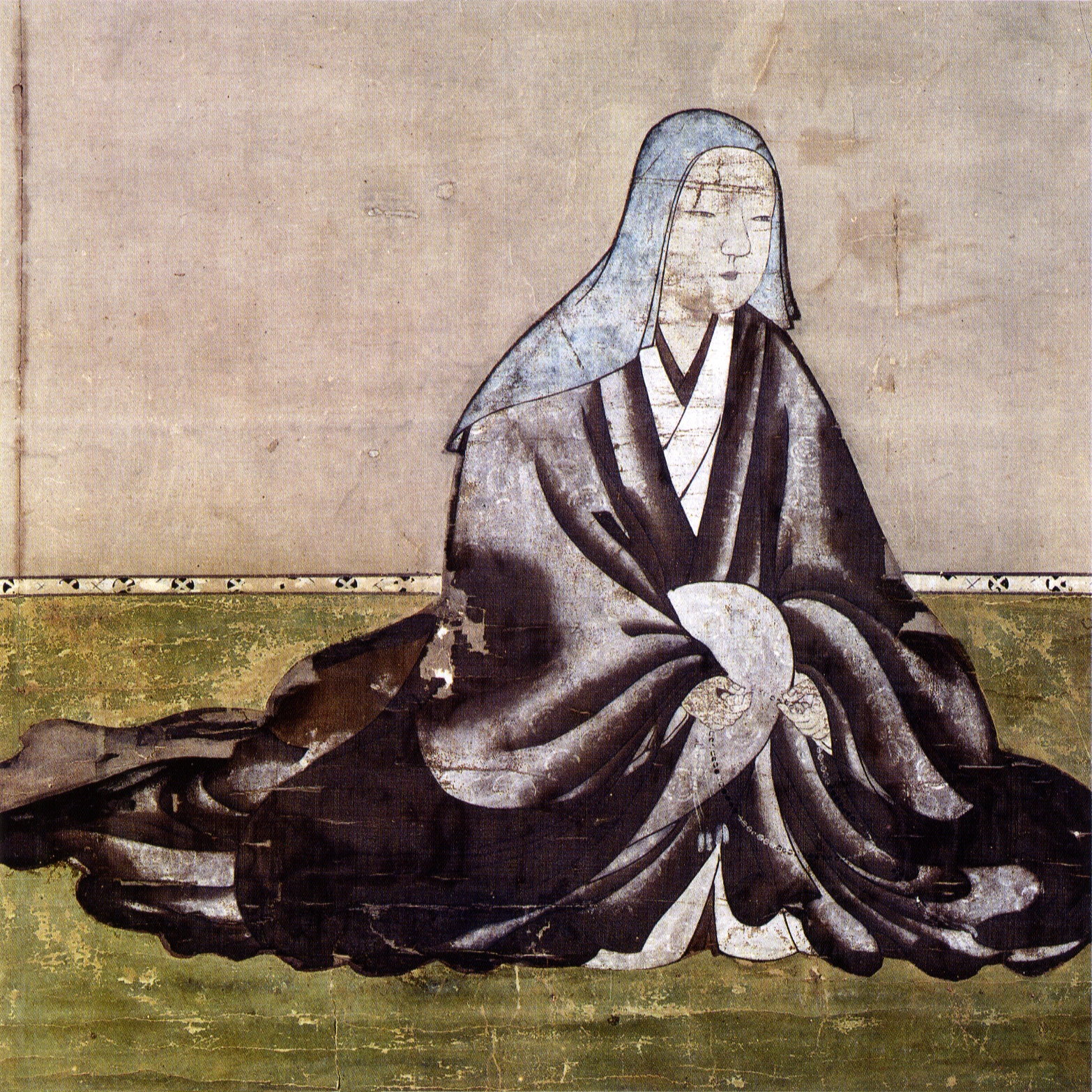
- Born: Ogō (小督); 1573
- Died: October 26, 1626 (aged 52–53); Edo Castle, Musashi, Japan
- Spouse: Saji Kazunari; Toyotomi Hidekatsu; Tokugawa Hidetada
- Children: Toyotomi Sadako; Senhime; Tamahime; Tokugawa Iemitsu; Tokugawa Tadanaga; Tokugawa Masako
- Parents: Azai Nagamasa (father); Oichi (mother)
- Family: Azai clan Toyotomi clan Tokugawa clan
- Honours: Junior First Rank (従一位, 1626)

Oeyo (於江与; 1573 – September 15, 1626), also known as Gō (江), Ogō (小督) or Satoko (達子), was a noblewoman in Japan's Azuchi–Momoyama period and early Edo period. She was a daughter of Oichi and the sister of Yodo-dono and Ohatsu. When she rose to higher political status during the Tokugawa shogunate, she took the title of "Ōmidaidokoro". Following the fall of the Council of Five Elders, Oeyo and her sisters were key figures in maintaining a diplomatic relationship between the two most powerful clans of their time, Toyotomi and Tokugawa. Due to her great contributions to politics at the beginning of the Edo period she was posthumously inducted into the Junior First Rank of the Imperial Court, the second highest honor that could be conferred by the Emperor of Japan. Through her daughter, Tokugawa Masako, she was the maternal grandmother of the Empress Meishō.

Oeyo married three times, first to Saji Kazunari, her cousin, then to Toyotomi Hideyoshi's nephew, Toyotomi Hidekatsu. She had a daughter with Hidekatsu named Toyotomi Sadako, who later married Kujō Yukiie. Her third and last husband Tokugawa Hidetada became the second Tokugawa shōgun. She was also the mother of his successor Iemitsu, the third shōgun. Her children included Senhime, Tamahime, Katsuhime, Hatsuhime, Takechiyo (Iemitsu), and Tadanaga. Hatsuhime was adopted by Oeyo's sister Ohatsu, who was married to Kyōgoku Takatsugu.

Surviving record books from merchants of luxury goods provide insight into patterns of patronage and taste amongst the privileged class of women like Oeyo and her sisters.

== Genealogy ==
Oeyo, also known as Ogō, was the third and youngest daughter of the Sengoku-period daimyō Azai Nagamasa. Her mother, Oichi was the younger sister of Oda Nobunaga. Toyotomi Hideyoshi became the adoptive father and protector of Oeyo in the period before her marriage.

Oeyo's oldest sister, styled Yodo-dono, Cha-Cha in birth name, was a prominent concubine of Hideyoshi who gave birth to his heir, Toyotomi Hideyori.

Oeyo's middle sister, Ohatsu was the wife of Kyōgoku Takatsugu and the mother of Kyōgoku Tadataka.

== Name ==
Oeyo, also known as Sōgen-in, was initially engaged to Saji Kazunari but was later separated from him by Toyotomi Hideyoshi. She subsequently married her adoptive nephew, Toyotomi Hidekatsu, and bore a daughter named Sadatako. Tragically, Hidekatsu died suddenly. For her third marriage, she wed Tokugawa Hidetada, who would become the second shogun of the Tokugawa Shogunate. She had two sons and five daughters, including a daughter named Takako.

Regarding her name, "Sōgen-in" was part of her posthumous title. There has been debate over its pronunciation. The authoritative "Kokushi Daijiten" suggests it should be pronounced as "Sūgen'in," with the character "崇" read as "sū." However, a document believed to be authored by Kasuga no Tsubone in the possession of Ryoan-ji Temple in Kyoto uses the reading "Sōgen'in-sama." Additionally, a provisional edition of "Kansei Shoka Keizu Den" also reads "崇源院殿" as "Sōgen'in den." These sources suggest that she may have been referred to as "Sōgen'in" during her time.

Her childhood name (commonly used name) was "Kogou" based on the oldest record found in "Taikō Sosei Ki." However, different historical sources have assigned the characters "江" or "郷" to her name. The change from the character "督" to "江" may have been due to her marriage to Tokugawa Hidetada, who was known as "Edo-chunagon" at the time.

In pre-modern Japan, most women retained their childhood names throughout their lives and did not have formal given names. However, in the upper classes, women were sometimes bestowed given names to be used in official documents, especially when receiving titles or honors. In the case of Sōgen-in, a formal given name "Michiko" was bestowed posthumously, as recorded in the "Chūin Tsūmura Nikki" from 1626.

In the case of noblewomen, they were often given honorary titles in addition to their childhood and given names. These titles could change based on their residence or status. Sōgen-in had several titles throughout her life, including "Kitano Kata," "Oshinzo," "Go-Shinzo," and "O-Go-Shinzo," each reflecting her changing circumstances and roles.

== Biography ==
=== Early life and marriages ===
Sōgen-in was born in Odani, Ōmi Province (present-day Nagahama, Shiga Prefecture), as the third daughter of Azai Nagamasa, a powerful regional daimyo. Her mother was Oichi no Kata, the daughter of Oda Nobuhide and sister of Oda Nobunaga.

The exact year of her birth is a subject of debate, with some sources suggesting 1570, based on her age at death, while others propose 1573. The latter is considered more likely, with some scholars estimating her birth month to be August.

In September 1573, Odani Castle, her family's stronghold, was attacked and taken by Oda Nobunaga, leading to the downfall of the Azai clan. Sōgen-in, along with her mother Oichi and sisters, was rescued by Oda Nobunaga's forces. After her father's suicide, she was placed under the care of her cousin, Oda Nobutada, Nobunaga's eldest son.

In June 1582, following the death of Oda Nobunaga in the Honnō-ji Incident, Sōgen-in, her mother, and her sisters were transferred to the care of Oda Nobunaga's son, Oda Nobutaka. They resided in Gifu Castle but were soon separated as her mother married Shibata Katsuie, one of Nobunaga's loyal retainers.

=== Marriage to Saji Kazunari ===
Sōgen-in's first marriage took place under the patronage of Toyotomi Hideyoshi. She married her cousin, Saji Kazunari, son of Oinu, the sister of Oda Nobunaga and Oichi. The marriage is believed to have taken place in 1583. Kazunari originally was the lord of Ōno Castle and retainer of the Oda clan. Following Oda Nobunaga's death in 1582, he pledged support to Hideyoshi.

However, this union was short-lived due to Toyotomi Hideyoshi's ambitions and conflicts within the Toyotomi clan. After Saji Kazunari supported his cousin, Oda Nobukatsu, during the Battle of Komaki and Nagakute, Hideyoshi ordered the dissolution of their marriage, resulting in Sōgen-in's separation from Kazunari.

=== Second marriage to Toyotomi Hidekatsu ===
After the dissolution of her first marriage, Sōgen-in found herself in a precarious position. During this period, Japan was in a state of turmoil, with various warlords vying for power. She eventually remarried, this time to her adoptive nephew, Toyotomi Hidekatsu, the nephew and adopted son of Toyotomi Hideyoshi. The exact date of their marriage remains uncertain, but it likely occurred in the late 1580s or early 1590s.

Hidekatsu was a loyal supporter of Hideyoshi and served as the lord of various domains. In 1592, Hidekatsu campaigned in Korea as part of the Imjin War, while Sōgen-in gave birth to their daughter, Toyotomi Sadako. Hidekatsu died of illness in Korea around the same time.

=== Third marriage to Tokugawa Hidetada ===
Sōgen-in's life took another dramatic turn. On September 17, 1595, she remarried in Fushimi, becoming the wife of Tokugawa Ieyasu's heir, Tokugawa Hidetada. Hidetada, who had come to Kyoto in 1590 during the 18th year of the Tensho era, had been engaged to Oda Nobunaga's daughter, Oda Go, who was also a ward of Toyotomi Hideyoshi. However, their wedding plans were never realized due to Go's untimely death. Hidetada and she went on to have seven children, with their eldest daughter, Senhime, born in 1597.

In 1600, during the 5th year of the Keicho era, Toyotomi Hideyoshi expanded the hall of Sennyu-ji Temple and built a shrine dedicated to Oda Nobunaga on the former site of Azuchi Castle. Subsequently, after Hideyoshi's death, she instructed Niwa Nagashige to rebuild the shrine in the ashes of Azuchi Castle.

During the Siege of Osaka in 1614-1615, the Toyotomi clan was defeated, and she lost her sister Yodo-dono. On May 7, 1617, she mourned for Yodo-dono and Toyotomi Hideyori at Yogen-in Temple. When Yogen-in, the temple founded by Yodo-dono in memory of their father, Azai Nagamasa, was destroyed by fire in 1619, she petitioned the Tokugawa shogunate to rebuild it. Her request was granted, and the temple was reconstructed in 1621.

== Death and legacy ==
She died on September 15, 1626, at Edo Castle's Nishinomaru (Western Bailey) at the age of 54. Her posthumous Buddhist name was "Sugeden-in Donsho Wako Ninsei Shojotei Ni."

Following her death, she was buried at Zōjō-ji Temple in Tokyo's Minato Ward, at the same site as her husband Tokugawa Hidetada and other Tokugawa shogunate members.

There are also memorial pagodas dedicated to her at Kinkai-koji Temple in Kyoto's Sakyo Ward and Kongobu-ji Temple in Koya-cho, Wakayama Prefecture. These pagodas bear inscriptions recognizing her as "Sugeden-in Donsho Wako Ninsei." Another memorial pagoda is located inside the Rokkakudo Pagoda at Konkai Kōmyō-ji Temple in Kyoto, with the inscription "Sugeden-in Gen Donsho Taishi."

In summary, her life was marked by her marriages to prominent figures of the time, her involvement in the reconstruction of religious sites, and her contributions to the Tokugawa family. Her legacy is commemorated in several memorial pagodas across Japan.

== Family ==
- Father: Azai Nagamasa (1545–1573)
- Mother: Oichi (1547–1583)
- Step-Father: Shibata Katsuie (1522–1583)
- Foster Father: Toyotomi Hideyoshi (1537–1598)
- Husbands:
  - Saji Kazunari (m. 1583 div. 1584)
  - Toyotomi Hidekatsu (m. 1591–1592)
  - Tokugawa Hidetada (m. 1595)
- Children:

=== by Hidekatsu ===
- Toyotomi Sadako (1592–1658), adopted by Toyotomi Hideyoshi and Yodo-dono later married Kujō Yukiie and later adopted by Tokugawa Hidetada

=== by Hidetada ===
- Senhime (1597–1666)
- Tamahime (1599–1622)
- Katsuhime
- Hatsuhime
- Tokugawa Iemitsu (1604–1651)
- Tokugawa Tadanaga (1606–1634)
- Tokugawa Masako (1607–1678)

== Timeline ==
- 1573: Born
- 1573: Azai Nagamasa and Manpukumaru committed suicide, Oichi and her daughters returned to Oda clan.
- 1579: Moved to Azuchi Castle from Ise-Ueno Castle
- 1582: Oda Nobunaga was betrayed
- 1582: Oichi married to Shibata Katsuie
- 1583: Shibata Katsuie and Oichi committed suicide
- 1583: Married Saji Kazunari
- 1584: Divorced with Saji Kazunari
- 1587: Ohatsu married Kyōgoku Takatsugu
- 1589: Yodo-dono gave birth to Toyotomi Tsurumatsu
- 1591: Yodo-dono's son, Toyotomi Tsurumatsu died
- 1591: Married with Toyotomi Hidekatsu and moved to Jurakudai
- 1592: Toyotomi Hidekatsu died
- 1592: Gave birth to Toyotomi Sadako
- 1593: Yodo-dono gave birth to Toyotomi Hideyori
- 1595: Toyotomi Hidetsugu committed suicide and Jurakudai was dismantled
- 1595: Married Tokugawa Hidetada.
- 1597: May 26: Gave birth to Sen-hime
- 1599: Aug. 1: Gave birth to Tama-hime (died 9 August 1622)
- 1601: June 12: Gave birth to Katsu-hime (died 20 March 1672)
- 1601: Tamahime married Maeda Toshitsune
- 1602: Aug. 25: Gave birth to Hatsu-hime (died 16 April 1630)
- 1603: Senhime married to Toyotomi Hideyori
- 1603: June 3: Toyotomi Sadako married Kujō Yukiie
- 1604: Aug. 12: Gave birth to Iemitsu
- 1605: Hidetada becomes shogun
- 1606: June 12: Gave birth to Tadanaga
- 1607: Nov. 23: Gave birth to Matsu-hime Tokugawa Masako
- 1607: Sadahime gave birth to Nijō Yasumichi
- 1607: Hatsu-hime married Kyōgoku Tadataka
- 1609: Sadahime gave birth to Kujō Michifusa
- 1611: Katsuhime married Matsudaira Tadanao
- 1613: Tamahime give birth to Kametsuru-hime
- 1615: Toyotomi Hideyori and his mother Yodo-dono committed suicide, Osaka Castle burned and Senhime returned to Tokugawa Family.
- 1615: Sadahime gave birth to Matsudono Michimoto
- 1615: Tamahime gave birth to Maeda Mitsutaka
- 1616: Tamahime gave birth to Eihime
- 1616: Senhime married to Honda Tadatoki
- 1616: Katsuhime gave birth to Matsudaira Mitsunaga
- 1617: Tamahime's daughter, Eihime died
- 1617: Tamahime gave birth to Maeda Toshitsugu
- 1617: Katsuhime gave birth to Kamehime
- 1618: Senhime gave birth to (Honda) Katsuhime
- 1618: Tamahime gave birth to Maeda Toshiharu
- 1618: (Tokugawa) Katsuhime gave birth to Tsuruhime
- 1619: Senhime gave birth to Kochiyo
- 1619: Tamahime gave birth to Mitsuhime
- 1620: Masako married Emperor Go-Mizunoo
- 1621: Senhime's son, Kochiyo died
- 1621: Tamahime gave birth to Tomihime
- 1622: Katsuhime divorced Matsudaira Tadanao and went back to Tokugawa clan with her children.
- 1622: Tamahime gave birth to Natsuhime and died during childbirth
- 1623: daughter of Tamahime, Natsuhime died
- 1623: Iemitsu becomes shogun
- 1623: Iemitsu married Takaatsukasa Takako
- 1624: Tokugawa Masako gave birth to Empress Meishō
- 1625: Masako gave birth to Onna-ni-no-Miya
- 1626: Honda Tadatoki died, Senhime went back to Tokugawa Family with her daughter
- 1626: Died while Hidetada and Iemitsu were in Kyoto
- 1626: Received the posthumous court rank of Jūichi-i

== Burial ==
After Hidetada resigned the government to his eldest son in 1623, Oeyo took a Buddhist name, Sūgen'in (崇源院) or Sogenin. Her mausoleum can be found at Zōjō-ji in the Shiba neighborhood of Tokyo.

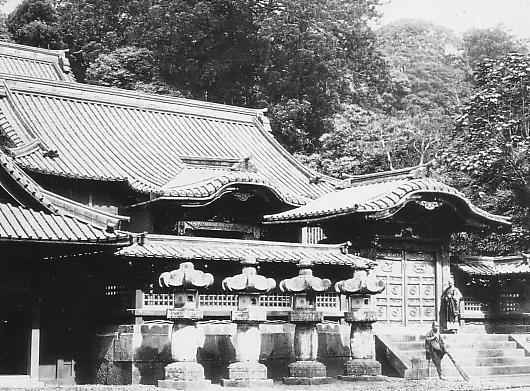
Mausoleum of Sugenin taken in Meiji Era

== Honours ==
- Junior First Rank (November 28, 1626; posthumous)

== Taiga drama ==
NHK's 2011 Taiga drama, Gō: Himetachi no Sengoku, is based on the life of Oeyo who is played by the actress Juri Ueno.

== Notable descendants ==
Together with Odai no Kata (Ieyasu's mother) and Lady Saigo (mother of Hidetada), Oeyo was the matriarch who stabilized the Tokugawa shogunate. Her descendants became shoguns, aristocrats and other prominent political figures. It is speculated that her son, Iemitsu, was the last direct male descendant of Tokugawa Ieyasu, thus ending the patrilineality of the shogunate for the third generation.

- Toyotomi Sadako - daughter, married Kujo Yukiie
  - Matsudono Michiaki (1616–1646)
  - Nijō Yasumichi
    - Nijō Mitsuhira
  - Kujō Michifusa
    - a daughter, married Kujō Kaneharu
      - Kujō Sukezane
        - Kujō Morotaka
        - Zuisho-in, married Tokugawa Yoshimichi
          - Tokugawa Gorōta
        - Kujō Yukinori
          - Kujō Tanemoto
        - Kujō Naozane
          - Kujō Michisaki
            - Kujō Sukeie
          - Nijō Munemoto
            - Nijō Shigeyori (1751–1768)
            - Nijō Harutaka
              - Nijō Narimichi (1781–1798)
              - Kujō Suketsugu
              - Saionji
              - a daughter, married Tokugawa Nariatsu
              - a daughter, married Matsudaira Yoritsugu of Hitachi-Fuchū Domain
              - Kujō Hisatada
                - Kujō Asako, consort to Emperor Kōmei
                  - Imperial Princess Yoriko Naishinnō
                  - Imperial Princess Fuku
                - Michitaka
                - Matsuzono Hisayoshi
                - Tsurudono Tadayoshi
                - Takatsukasa Hiromichi
                  - Nobusuke Takatsukasa
                    - Toshimichi Takatsukasa
                  - Takatsukasa Nobuhiro (1892–1981)
                - Nijō Motohiro
                  - Nijō Atsumoto
              - Nijō Narinobu
                - Nijō Nariyuki
                  - Nijō Masamaro
                    - Nijō Toyomoto (1909–1944)
                    - Nijō Tamemoto (1911–1985)
              - Nijō Suiko married Nabeshima Naotomo
                - Nabeshima Naotada
- Tokugawa Masako - daughter, married Emperor Go-Mizunoo
  - Empress Meishō
  - Imperial Prince Takahito Shinno (1626–1628)
  - Imperial Princess On'nani no Miya Naishinno (1625–1651)
  - Wakamiya
  - Kikumiya
  - Imperial Princess Akiko no Miya Naishinno (1629–1675)
  - Imperial Princess Noriko no Miya Naishinno (1632–1696)
- Katsuhime - daughter, married Matsudaira Tadanao
  - Matsudaira Mitsunaga (1616–1707) of Takada Domain
    - Matsudaira Tsunakata (1633–1674)
  - Kamehime (1617–1681), married Takamatsu no Miya Yoshihito-Shinno, son of Emperor Go-Yōzei
  - Tsuruhime (1618–1671), married Kujō Michifusa
    - Third daughter married Asano Tsunaakira
    - Fifth daughter married Asano Tsunaakira
    - First daughter married Kujō Kaneharu
      - Kujō Sukezane
        - Zuisho-in married Tokugawa Yoshimichi
          - Tokugawa Gorota
        - Kujō Morotaka
        - Kujō Yukinori
          - Kujō Tanemoto
          - Nijō Munemoto
            - Nijō Shigeyori (1751–1768)
            - Nijō Harutaka
              - Kujō Hisatada
                - Matsuzono Hisayoshi
                - Tsurudono Tadayoshi
                - Takatsukasa Hiromichi
                  - Takatsukasa Nobuhiro
                  - Nobusuke Takatsukasa
                    - Toshimichi Takatsukasa
                - Nijō Motohiro
                  - Nijō Atsumoto
                - Empress Eishō
                  - Imperial Princess Yoriko Naishinnō
                  - Imperial Princess Fuko
                - Kujo Michitaka
                  - Empress Teimei
                    - Nobuhito, Prince Takamatsu
                    - Yasuhito, Prince Chichibu
                    - Takahito, Prince Mikasa
                      - Prince Tomohito of Mikasa
                        - Princess Yoko of Mikasa
                        - Princess Akiko of Mikasa
                      - Princess Yasuko of Mikasa
                        - Tadahiro Konoe (b. 1970)
                      - Yoshihito, Prince Katsura
                      - Norihito, Prince Takamado
                        - Princess Tsuguko of Takamado
                        - Princess Noriko of Takamado
                        - Princess Ayako of Takamado
                      - Princess Masako of Mikasa
                        - Akifumi Sen
                        - Makiko Sen
                        - Takafumi Sen
                    - Hirohito, Emperor Showa
                      - Akihito, Emperor of Japan
                        - Sayako, Princess Nori
                        - Fumihito, Prince Akishino
                          - Princess Mako of Akishino
                          - Princess Kako of Akishino
                          - Prince Hisahito of Akishino
                        - Naruhito, Emperor of Japan
                          - Aiko, Princess Toshi
                      - Takako, Princess Suga
                        - Yoshihisa Shimazu (b. 1962)
                      - Masahito, Prince Hitachi
                      - Atsuko, Princess Yori
                      - Kazuko, Princess Taka
                      - Sachiko, Princess Hisa
                      - Shigeko, Princess Teru
                        - Mibu Motohiro (b. 1949)
                        - Princess Fumiko of Higashikuni (b. 1946)
                        - Princess Yuko of Higashikuni (b. 1954)
                        - Prince Naohiko Higashikuni
                          - Prince Teruhiko Higashikuni
                          - Prince Mutsuhiko Higashikuni
                        - Prince Nobuhiko Higashikuni (b. 1945)
                          - Prince Yukihiko Higashikuni (b. 1974)
              - Nijō Narimichi (1781–1798)
              - Sainjo
              - Kujō Suketsugu
              - Nijō Suiko, married Nabeshima Naotomo
                - Nabeshima Naotada
              - Nijō Narinobu
                - Nijō Nariyuki
                  - Nijō Masamaro
                    - Nijo Toyomoto (1909–1944)
                    - Nijo Tamemoto (1911–1985)
        - Kujō Naozane
          - Kujō Michisaki
            - Kujō Sukeie
- Senhime – daughter, married Toyotomi Hideyori, and later Honda Tadatoki
  - Kochiyo (1619–1621)
  - Katsuhime (1618–1678), married Ikeda Mitsumasa
    - Tsuhime (1636–1717), married Ichijō Norisuke
      - Ichijō Kaneteru
    - Ikeda Tsunamasa
      - Ikeda Tsugumasa
        - Ikeda Munemasa
          - Ikeda Harumasa (1750–1819)
            - Ikeda Narimasa (1779–1833)
          - Sagara Nagahiro (1752–1813)
            - Sagara Yorinori (1774–1856)
              - Sagara Yoriyuki (1798–1850)
                - Ikeda Akimasa (1836–1903)
                  - Ikeda Narimasa (1865–1909)
                    - Ikeda Tadamasa (1895–1902)
                    - Ikeda Nobumasa (1904–1988)
                      - Ikeda Takamasa (1926–2012), married Atsuko Ikeda
- Tamahime - daughter, married Maeda Toshitsune
  - Maeda Toshitsugu
    - Maeda Masatoshi (1649–1706)
  - Manhime (1618–1700), married Asano Mitsuakira
    - Asano Naganao (1644–1666)
    - Asano Nagateru (1652–1702)
    - Asano Tsunaakira
      - Asano Tsunanaga
        - Asano Yoshinaga
          - Asano Munetsune
            - Asano Shigeakira
              - Asano Narikata
                - Asano Naritaka
                  - Asano Yoshiteru
              - Asano Nagatoshi
                - Asano Nagamichi
                - Asano Toshitsugu
                  - Asano Nagayuki
                    - Asano Nagatake
                      - Asano Nagayoshi
                        - Asano Nagataka (b. 1956)
              - Asano Toshiteru
                - Asano Nagakoto
  - Komatsuruhime (1613–1630), married Mōri Tadahiro
  - Tomi-hime (1621–1662)
  - Maeda Mitsutaka
    - Maeda Tsunanori
      - Maeda Toshiaki (1691–1737)
        - Maeda Toshimichi (1737–1781)
          - Maeda Toshitoyo (1771–1836)
            - Maeda Toshihiro (1823–1877)
              - Maeda Toshiaki (1850–1896)
                - Toshinari Maeda
                  - Maeda Toshitatsu (1908–1989)
                    - Maeda Toshihiri (b. 1935)
                      - Maeda Toshitaka (b. 1963)
                        - Maeda Toshikyo (b. 1993)
      - Maeda Yoshinori
        - Maeda Munetoki
        - Maeda Shigehiro
        - Maeda Shigenobu
        - Maeda Harunaga
        - Maeda Shigemichi
          - Maeda Narinaga
            - Maeda Nariyasu
              - Maeda Yoshiyasu
                - Yoshitsugu Maeda (1858–1900)
- Tokugawa Iemitsu - son, married Takatsukasa Takako, plus eight concubines
  - Chiyohime- daughter, married Tokugawa Mitsutomo
    - Tokugawa Tsunanari
      - Matsudaira Yoshitaka
      - Tokugawa Tsugutomo
      - Matsuhime, married Maeda Yoshinori
      - Tokugawa Muneharu
      - Tokugawa Yoshimichi
        - Tokugawa Gorōta
        - Shinjuin (1706–1757), married Kujō Yukinori
          - Kujō Tanemoto
          - Nijō Munemoto
            - Nijō Shigeyoshi (1751–1768)
            - Nijō Harutaka
              - Nijō Suiko, married Nabeshima Naotomo
                - Nabeshima Naotada
              - Nijo Narimichi
              - Saionji
              - Kujō Suketsugu
              - Nijō Narinobu
                - Nijō Nariyuki
                - Nijō Masamaro
                  - Nijō Tamemoto (1911–1985)
                  - Nijō Toyomoto (1909–1944)
              - Kujo Hisatada
                - Empress Eishō
                  - Imperial Princess Yoriko Naishinnō
                  - Imperial Princess Fuko
                - Kujō Michitaka
                - Takatsukasa Hiromichi
                  - Nobusuke Takatsukasa
                    - Toshimichi Takatsukasa
                  - Takatsukasa Nobuhiro (1892–1981)
                - Nijō Motohiro
                  - Nijō Atsumoto
                - Tsurudono Tadayoshi
                - Matsuzono Hisayoshi
  - Tokugawa Ietsuna - son, married Aso no miya Akiko, plus 12 concubines
    - Moyohime (1659–1660)
    - Tokugawa Tsunayoshi (1659–1660)
  - Tokugawa Tsunayoshi - son, married Takatsukasa Nobuko, plus four concubines
    - Tokugawa Tokumatsu (1679–1683)
    - Tokugawa Chomatsu (1683–1686)
    - Tsuruhime (1677–1704)
  - Tokugawa Tsunashige - son, married Ryuso-in, plus two concubines
    - Matsudaira Kiyotake (1663–1724)
      - Matsudaira Kiyokata (1697-1724)
    - Tokugawa Ienobu
      - Tokugawa Ietsugu
      - Tokugawa Daigoro (1709–1710)
      - Tokugawa Iechiyo (1707–1707)
      - Tokugawa Torakichi (1711–1712)
      - Toyo-hime (1681–1681)
      - Tokugawa Mugetsuin (1699–1699)
