= Nariyuki =

- Gender: Male

Origin
- Origin: Japanese
- Meaning: Different meanings depending on the kanji used

Nariyuki (written: 斉敬 or 成幸) is a masculine Japanese given name. Notable people with the name include:

- Nariyuki Masuda (増田 成幸) (born 1983), Japanese cyclist
- Nijō Nariyuki (二条 斉敬) (1816–1878), Japanese kugyō
