= Saji Kazunari =

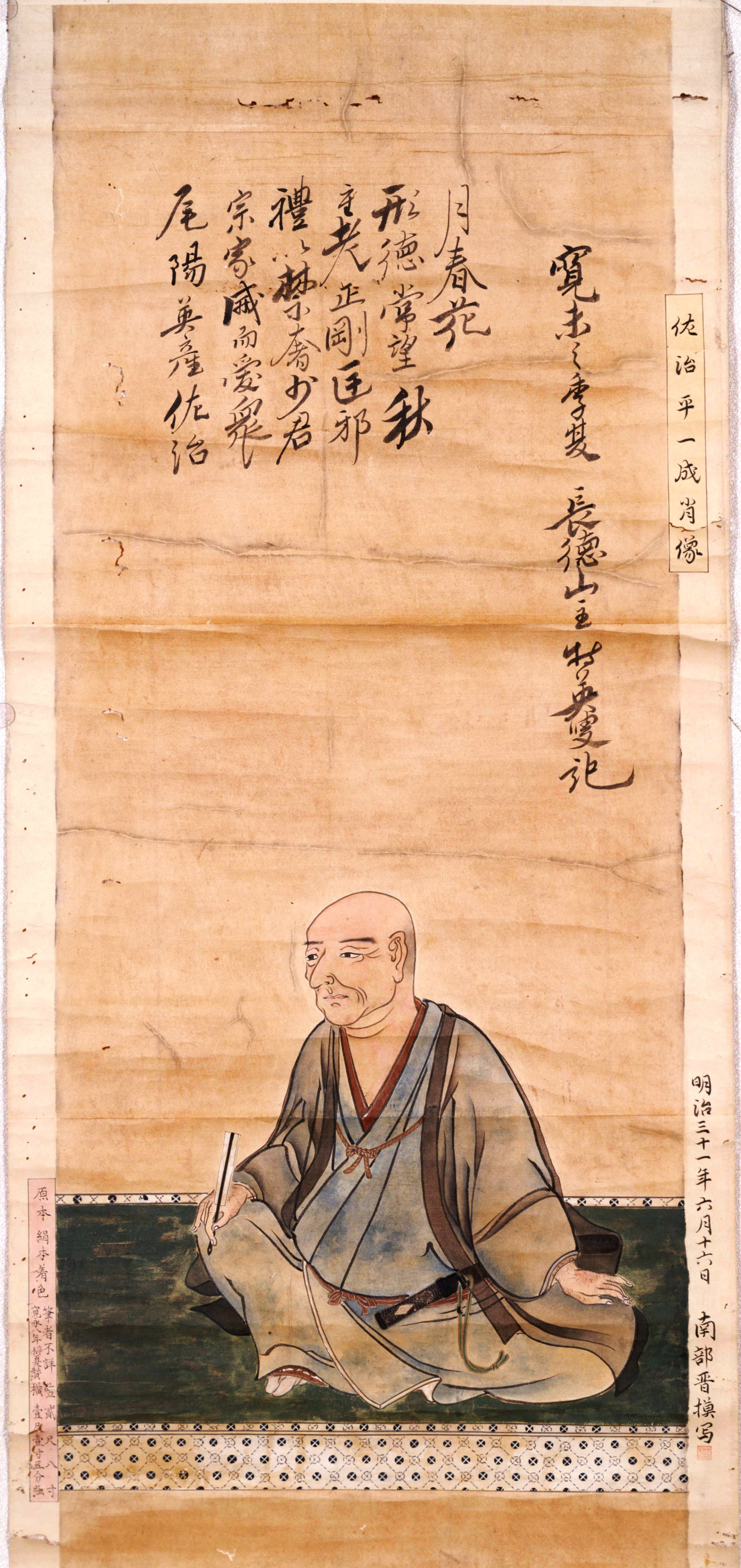
Saji Kazunari

Saji Kazunari (佐治一成; 1569 – November 16, 1634) was a Japanese samurai warrior of the Sengoku period and Edo period.

== Family ==
- Father: Saji Nobukata
- Mother: Oinu, sister of Oda Nobunaga
- Wives:
  - Oeyo (m.1583, div.1592)
  - Oushin daughter of Oda Nobunaga
- Children:
  - Kitahime
  - Nuihime
  - Saji Tamenari

== Career ==
He was warden of a castle in a province under the control of Toyotomi Hideyoshi. Hideyoshi caused Kazunari to marry Oeyo, the sister of a favorite concubine. When Kazunari's support for Tokugawa Ieyasu became known, Hideyoshi took back the woman. She later married Ieyasu's son Tokugawa Hidetada and mothered the shōgun Tokugawa Iemitsu.

== In popular culture ==
Saji is played by Takehiro Hira in the NHK Taiga drama Gō (2011).
