= Oinu =

Oinu no Kata お犬 Oinu
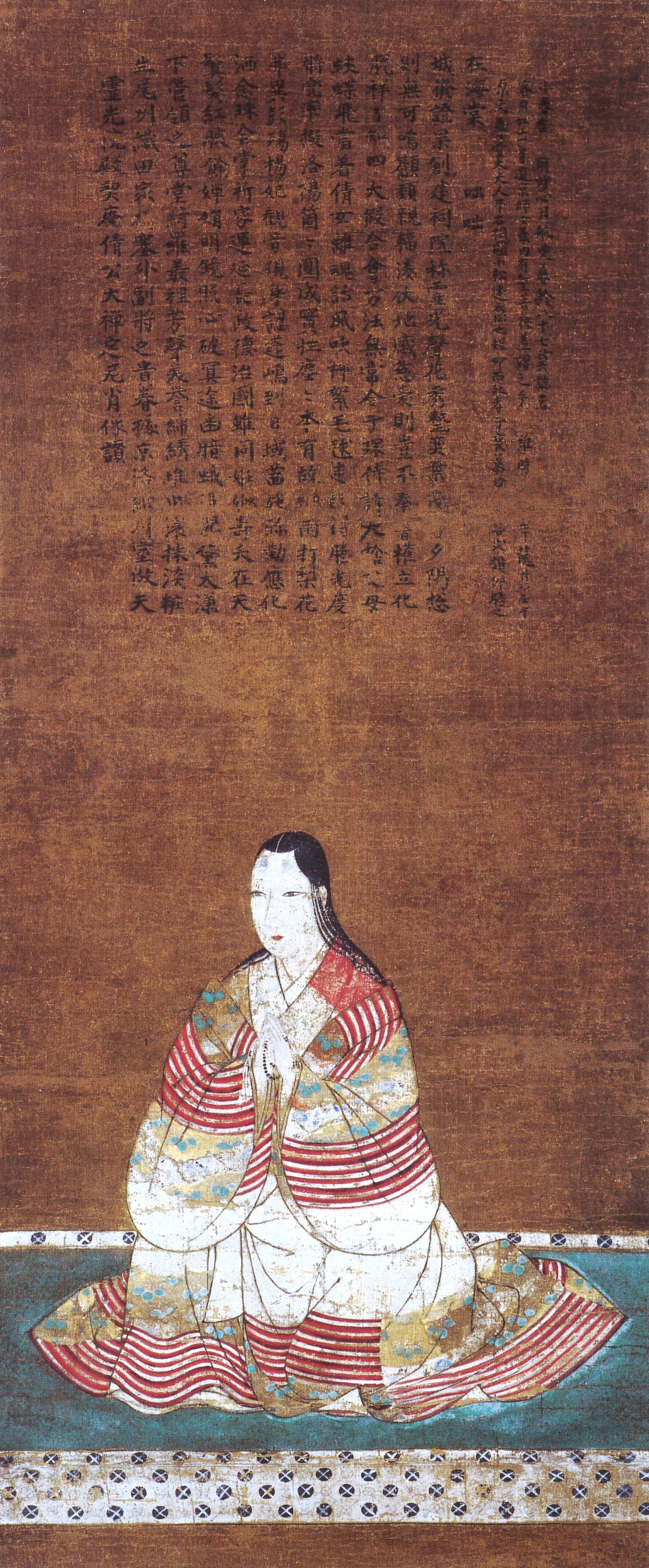
- Portrait of Oinu no Kata, stored at Ryōan-ji
- Born: Unknown
- Died: September 24, 1582
- Spouse: Saji Nobukata; Hosokawa Akimoto
- Children: Saji Kazunari; Nakagawa Hideyasu; Hosokawa Motokatsu
- Father: Oda Nobuhide
- Relatives: Oda clan Hosokawa clan

Oinu (お犬, died September 24, 1582) was a Japanese noblewoman and a member of the prominent Oda clan in the Sengoku period. She was the daughter of Oda Nobuhide and the younger sister of Oda Nobunaga, one of the leading figures of the Sengoku period Japan. She is commonly known as Oinu no Kata (お犬の方), "no Kata" indicating her status as an official wife.

== Life ==
Oinu was the eighth daughter of daimyo Oda Nobuhide. She was the younger sister of Oda Nobunaga and the elder sister of Oichi.

Oinu initially married Saji Nobukata, Lord of Ōno Castle, who ruled the western part of Chita in Owari Province. The two had two children, Saji Kazunari and Nakagawa Hideyasu.

In 1574, Nobukata was killed in battle during the Sieges of Nagashima, and Oinu returned to her parents' home. She went to live at the Gifu Castle, the residence of her elder brother Nobunaga.

She was introduced to Lord of Makishima Castle Hosokawa Akimoto, the eldest son of Deputy Shogun Hosokawa Harumoto, by Nobunaga's retainer Toyotomi Hideyoshi, and the two subsequently married in 1577. The two had three children; the only son, Hosokawa Motokatsu, became a retainer of Toyotomi Hideyoshi; the eldest daughter married Akita Sanesue; and the second daughter served as a lady attendant of Tamahime, the wife of Maeda Toshitsune.

Oinu died on September 24, 1582. Following Oinu's death, her son Kazunari sent her family 3 kan, 989 mon as condolence money. The next year, he sent an extra 19 kan, 655 mon. From this, it can be seen that Oinu had been in contact with Kazunari even after her husband's death. Her funeral was held by her wet nurse Jōchi-in.

== Legacy ==
After the death of Oinu, Reikō-in temple was built as her mausoleum at the Ryōan-ji temple in Kyoto. A portrait of Oinu survives at the temple, depicting her in a kosode and koshimaki, holding prayer beads with both hands and sitting on one knee with her palms together.

There are records of the 44th Gekkō Sōzu of Myōshin-ji temple praising her beauty and offering condolences for her young death. The description of the eulogy indicates that the portrait was created by the children of Oinu in the year of her death.

According to the records of Shōsen-ji temple in Ebisu, Shibuya, Tokyo, the temple was established by "Oda, the wife of Hosokawa". The temple was established as Reikō-in in Ōsawa, Hitotsugi in 1604, with Jiei as its founding monk. It is a branch temple of the Rinzai school Myōshin-ji. In 1695, the temple moved to Hitotsugi, Akasaka, and changed its name to Ryūokusan Shōsen-ji.

== Family ==
- Father: Oda Nobuhide
- Elder brother: Oda Nobunaga
- Younger sister: Oichi
- First husband: Saji Nobukata
  - Son: Saji Kazunari
  - Son: Nakagawa Hideyasu
- Second husband: Hosokawa Akimoto
  - First son: Hosokawa Motokatsu
  - First daughter: Wife of Akita Sanesue
  - Second daughter: Lady attendant of Tamahime
