= Matsudaira Tadanao =

Japanese samurai (1595–1650)

- 松平 忠直
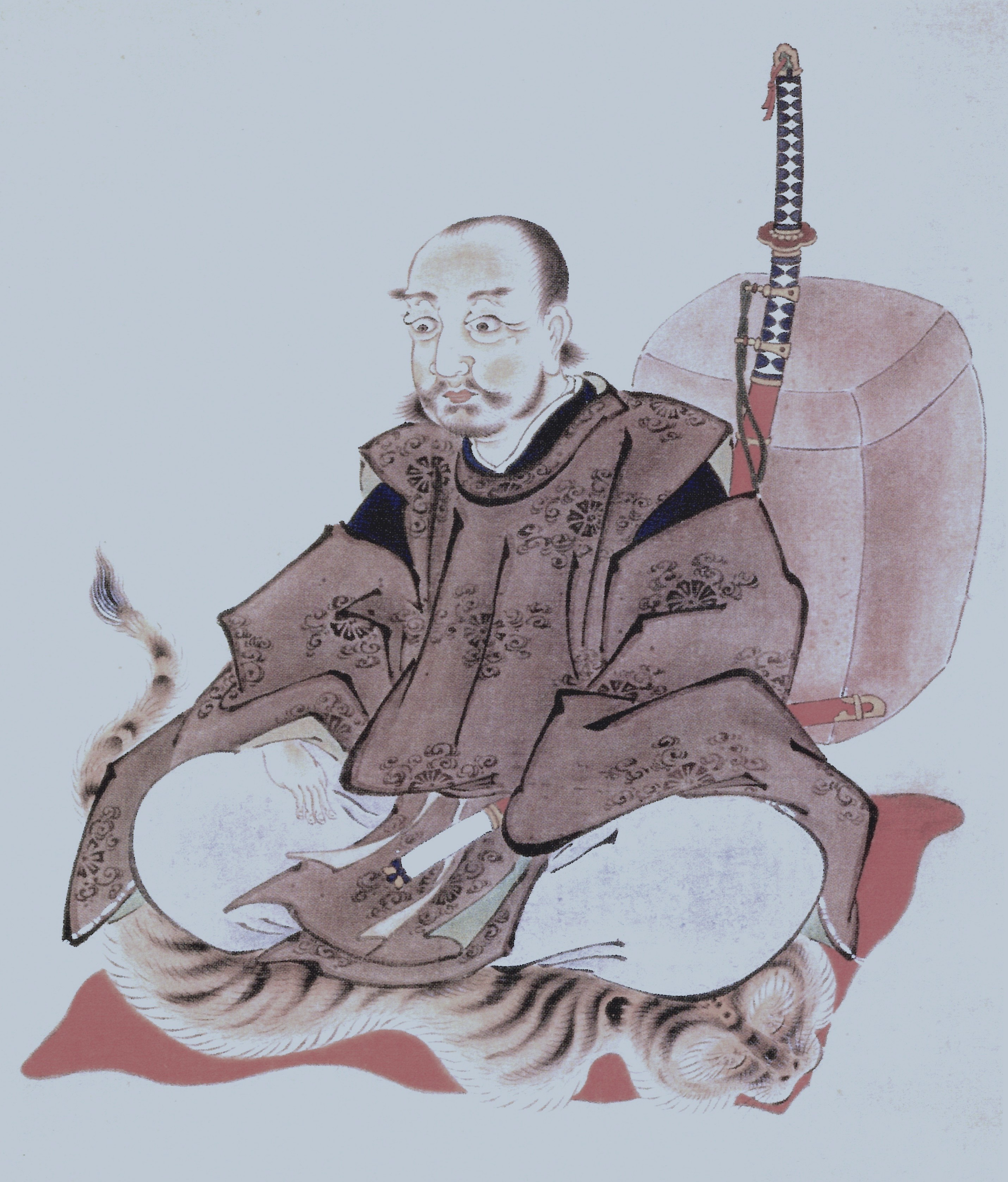
- Born: July 16, 1595; Edo, Japan
- Died: October 5, 1650 (aged 55); Settsu Province, Japan
- Burial place: Oita, Oita, Japan
- Title: Daimyō of Fukui Domain
- Predecessor: Yūki Hideyasu
- Successor: Matsudaira Tadamasa
- Spouse: daughter of Tokugawa Hidetada
- Father: Yūki Hideyasu

Matsudaira Tadanao (松平 忠直; 16 July 1595 – 5 October 1650) was a Japanese samurai lord from Sengoku to early Edo period, who was the 2nd daimyō of Fukui Domain in Echizen Province.

== Biography ==
Tadanao was born in Settsu Province in 1595 as the eldest son of Yūki Hideyasu. His childhood name was Senchiyomaru (仙千代). In 1603, he travelled to Edo with his father, and was received by his uncle, Shōgun Tokugawa Hidetada, who took a great liking to him. In 1605, he received the courtesy title was Mikawa-no-kami, and his Court rank of Senior Fourth Rank, Lower Grade. His courtesy title was elevated to Ukonoue-gon-shōshō the following year.

In 1607, on the death of his father, he became daimyō of the 670,000 koku Fukui Domain and in 1611 was wed to Katsuhime, one of Hidetada's daughters. He also underwent the genpuku ceremony and was granted a kanji from Hidetada's name, becoming Matsudaira Tadanao and his courtesy title was changed to Sakonoue-gon-shōshō, and rank elevated to Senior Fourth Rank, Upper Grade.

However, from 1612 to 1613, there was armed conflict within Fukui Domain between various of his senior retainers. The issues were resolved with some difficulty by the shogunate, who blamed Tadanao's youth and inexperience for allowing the situation to get out of hand.

Tadanao led Fukui troops in battle at the Osaka Winter Campaign, but lost control of his mercenary troops, for which he was scolded severely by his grandfather, the retired shōgun Tokugawa Ieyasu. He took part in the next year's Summer Campaign, taking the head of Sanada Yukimura, and leading his forces at the very tip of the Tokugawa advance into Osaka Castle. However, he received no reward for his efforts, and his court rank remained at the jusanmi-sangi (従三位参議; senior 3rd rank, councillor) which he had been awarded in 1615, although his father had been chūnagon (中納言; Middle Councilor). He was, however, granted the courtesy titles of Echizen-no-kami and Sakonoue-gon-chūshō in 1615. Tadanao was so upset with the perceived insult that in 1621 he feigned illness and did not make his required sankin kōtai trip to Edo; in 1622 he even attempted to poison his wife (who was saved at the last moment by one of her maids taking her place). He even led his own soldiers on rampages through the homes of retainers.

In 1622, he was banished by Hidetada to Funai Domain in Bungo Province, where he was allowed a 10,000 koku allowance. He also entered the Buddhist priesthood, taking the name Ippaku (一伯). For the first three years, he lived at Ogiwara village on the coast, but then moved to an inland location at the insistence of local authorities, who feared that he might attempt to escape.

He died in 1650 at age 56.

Tadanao's son Mitsunaga was transferred from Fukui to Takada Domain in Echigo Province.

Tadanao's brother Tadamasa was transferred to Fukui Domain, The clan continued to hold the fief until the end of the Edo period.

== Family ==
- Father: Yūki Hideyasu
- Mother: Lady Nakagawa
- Wife: Tokugawa Katsuhime (1601–1672), daughter of the 2nd shōgun Tokugawa Hidetada and Asai Oeyo
- Concubines:
  - Hiraga-dono
  - Nagami-dono
  - Koito-dono
  - Ikoku-dono
- Children:
  - Matsudaira Mitsunaga (1616–1707) by Katsuhime, daimyō of Tsuyama Domain
  - Nagami Nagayori (1630–1667) by Nagano-dono
  - Nagami Nagayoshi (1632–1701) by Nagano-dono
  - Kamehime (1617–1681) by Katsuhime, married Takamatsu no Miya Yoshihito-Shinno, son of Emperor Go-Yōzei
  - Tsuruhime (1618–1671) by Katsuhime, adopted daughter of Tokugawa Iemitsu, married Kujō Michifusa
  - Kanhime married Oguri Masanori

| Preceded by Yūki Hideyasu | 2nd Daimyō of Fukui; 1607–1623 | Succeeded by Matsudaira Tadamasa |
