= Tamahime =

Spouse of Maeda Toshitsune (1599–1622)

Tamahime (珠姫) or Tama (1599-1622) was a Japanese noble lady, member of the aristocrat Tokugawa family during the Edo period. She was the second daughter of the shogun Tokugawa Hidetada, and her mother was Oeyo, both important figures who stabilized and ruled the Tokugawa shogunate. She was also the wife of Maeda Toshitsune, the 2nd daimyō of Kaga Domain.

== Genealogy ==
Tamahime was the daughter of Hidetada, the second shogun of the Edo era, son of Tokugawa Ieyasu. Her mother was Oeyo, third daughter of Azai Nagamasa with Oichi and niece of Oda Nobunaga. She was the sister of Senhime (wife of Toyotomi Hideyori), Katsuhime (1601-1672), Hatsuhime (1602-1630), Tokugawa Iemitsu (1604-1651), Tokugawa Tadanaga (1606-1633) and Empress Masako (1607 -1678).

== Life ==
In 1600, after the Battle of Sekigahara, she became engaged to Maeda Toshinori. In 1601, she moved from Edo to Kanazawa and got married. At this time, she was only three years old. However, it is noted that Oonishi Yasumasa, based on a letter from Ono Harunaga to Maeda family retainer Yamashita Hyogo, suggests that the actual wedding took place around April of 1605, based on the timing of Ono's letter.

In 1613, she gave birth to her eldest daughter, Kamezuru (later married to Mori Tadahiro). In 1615, she gave birth to her eldest son, Mitsutaka. In 1616, she gave birth to her second daughter, Ko-hime. In 1617, she gave birth to her second son, Toshitsugu. In 1618, she gave birth to her third son, Toshiharu. In 1619, she gave birth to her third daughter, Mitsuru (later married to Asano Mitsuharu). In 1621, she gave birth to her fourth daughter, Tomi (later married to Prince Chichibu Tomochika).

In 1622, after giving birth to her fifth daughter, Natsu, her health deteriorated, and she died in July at the age of 24. She left behind three sons and five daughters with her husband, Toshinori. She was posthumously given the Buddhist name Tendokuin Daisetsu Jōni. The temple Tendokuin was established on Mount Koya in the same year, and in 1623, a temple with the same name was also built in Kanazawa, both by Maeda Toshinori. Her current grave is located in the Nodayama Cemetery.

== Anecdotes ==
In 1599, shortly after succeeding to the Maeda clan, Toshinaga, Tokugawa Ieyasu suspected him of treason and planned to subjugate Kaga. However, Maeda clan's senior retainer, Yokoyama Nagatomo, explained to Ieyasu and offered Toshinaga's mother, Maeda Matsu, as a hostage, promising to marry his daughter, Tamahime, to the Maeda family. After this incident, the Maeda clan switched to a pro-Tokugawa policy.

During her bridal journey, roads and bridges were prepared from Edo to Kanazawa, with tea houses built every ri, and entertainers such as actors and various artists accompanied the young princess so she wouldn't get bored, making it a luxurious and elaborate bridal journey receiving lavish hospitality from daimyos along the way.

It is said that during her bridal journey, the first Go-shiki-seika (five-color confectionery) was made by Kichizou, a confectioner in Kanazawa.

Although her marriage to Toshinori was a political one, it is said they were a very affectionate couple (a letter to her father, Hidetada, requesting him to allow Toshinori to return to Kaga during his duty rotation still exists. This can be inferred from the number of children mentioned above). However, fearing that information might leak to the Tokugawa shogunate due to the Maeda clan's status as an outsider, Tamahime's wet nurse, fearing that Tamahime's health deteriorated after Natsu's birth, not knowing the circumstances, Tamahime misunderstood that Toshinori's affection for her had diminished because his favor had waned, and she died of exhaustion. When Toshinori forcefully rushed to her deathbed, he realized everything from Tamahime's last words and, in anger, executed Tamahime's wet nurse by burning her at the stake.

== Family ==
At the age of 3, she entered a political marriage with Maeda Toshitsune (1594-1658), son of Maeda Toshiie, to strengthen the alliance between the Tokugawa and the Maeda. During the marriage they had many children

- Kikakuhime (1613-1630), adopted by Iemitsu and married to Mori Tadahiro, son of Mori Tadamasa.
- Maeda Mitsutaka (1616-1645)
- Maeda Toshitsugu (1617-1674)
- Maeda Toshiharu (1618-1660)
- Manhime (1620-1700) adopted by Iemitsu, married toAsano Mitsuakira
- Tomihime (1621-1662)

She lived little as a princess member of the Shogunate, dying in 1622 at the age of 22.
