= Nijō Motohiro =

Japanese peer (1859–1928)

Senior Second Rank Prince Nijō Motohiro 二条 基弘
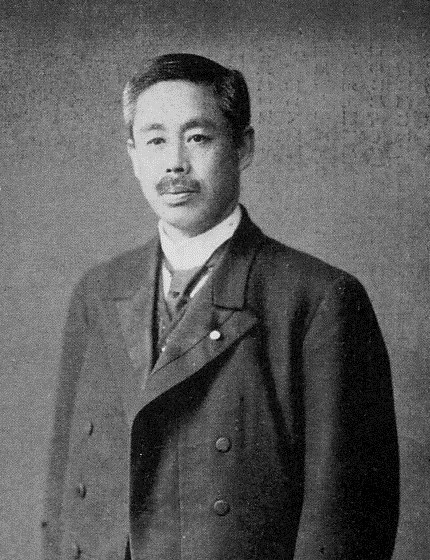
- Born: 19 November 1859; Kyoto, Japan
- Died: 2 April 1928 (aged 68); Nara, Japan
- Burial: Nison-in, Kyoto
- Spouse: Daughter of Maeda Nariyasu
- Father: Kujō Hisatada

Member of the House of Peers
- In office September 1890 – 14 January 1920 Hereditary peerage

Prince Nijō Motohiro (二条 基弘; 19 November 1859 – 2 April 1928), was a Japanese nobleman who served the Meiji government as a court official and member of House of Peers.

== Biography ==
Nijō Motohiro was born in Kyoto as the eighth son of Kujō Hisatada. He was adopted by Nijō Narinobu, another of the five regent houses, to carry on the Nijō family name. His wife was a daughter of Maeda Nariyasu, twelfth head of Kaga Domain. Their son was Nijō Atsumoto.

On 7 July 1869 as part of the reformation of the court nobility under the new Meiji government, Nijō Motohiro became a prince (koshaku) under the new kazoku peerage system. The change was regarded as a demotion by Nijō and many members of the old aristocracy, however, Nijō continued to serve Emperor Meiji as a court councilor. From September 1890 until January 1920, Nijō served as a member of the House of Peers. Together with Konoe Atsumarō, Nijō was a leader of the Sanyōkai faction within the upper house, which was critical of Itō Hirobumi’s pro-Jiyutō politics, plans for increased military expenditures after the First Sino-Japanese War, and plans for tax reform. He later served as high priest of Kasuga-taisha, the Fujiwara clan’s ancestral Shinto shrine in Nara.

Nijō was very interested in the development of Hokkaidō, and headed the Hokkaidō Kyōkai-kai. Another of his interests was photography, and he was vice-chairman of the Japan Photography Association headed by Tokugawa Atsuyoshi. He was also the honorary president of the Dai Nippon Kyudo Kai.
