= Nijō Atsumoto =

Japanese politician

- 二条 厚基
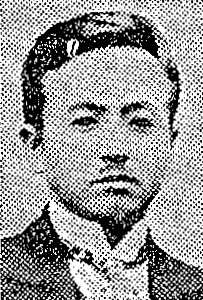
- Prince Nijō Atsumoto

Member of the House of Peers
- In office 30 June 1920 – 11 September 1927 Hereditary peerage

Personal details
- Born: 14 June 1883 Tokyo, Japan
- Died: 11 September 1927 (aged 44) Shinagawa, Tokyo, Japan
- Resting place: Nison-in
- Parent: Nijō Motohiro (father)
- Relatives: Nijō family
- Education: Tokyo Imperial University

Prince Nijō Atsumoto (二条 厚基; 14 June 1883 – 11 September 1927), son of Nijō Motohiro, was a Japanese politician who served as a member of House of Peers in the Meiji period (1868–1912). He adopted Nijō Masamaro's son Tamemoto.
