= Kujō Yukinori =

Kujō Yukinori (九条 幸教; July 2, 1700 – July 3, 1728), son of Sukezane and adopted son of his brother Morotaka, was a kugyō or Japanese court noble of the Edo period (1603–1868). He married a daughter of Tokugawa Yoshimichi (fourth head of Owari Domain) and adopted daughter of Tokugawa Tsugutomo (sixth head of Owari Domain) known as Shinjuin (1706–1757). The couple had two sons: Kujō Tanemoto and Nijō Munemoto.

== Family ==
- Father: Kujō Sukezane
- Mother: concubine
- Foster mother: Imperial Princess Mashiko (1669–1738)
- Wife: Senhime (1706–1757)
- Children (all by Senhime):
  - Kujō Tanemoto
  - Nijō Munemoto
