= Kujō Sukezane =

Kujō Sukezane (九条 輔実; 1669 – 1729), son of Kaneharu, was a kugyō or Japanese court noble of the Edo period (1603–1868). He held regent positions sesshō from 1712 to 1716 and kampaku from 1716 to 1722. He married a daughter of Emperor Go-Sai; the couple had three sons, Morotaka, Yukinori and Naozane, and a daughter who later became a consort of Tokugawa Yoshimichi, fourth head of Owari Domain later known as Zuisho-in.

== Family ==
- Father: Kujō Kaneharu
- Mother: Tokihime
- Wife: Imperial Princess Mashiko (1669-1738)
- concubine: unknown
- Children:
  - Kujō Morotaka by Mashiko
  - Kujō Yukinori by Concubine later adopted by Mashiko
  - Kujō Naozane by Mashiko
  - Kujo Sukeko married Tokugawa Yoshimichi by Mashiko
