= Kujō Naozane =

Kujō Naozane (九条 尚実; 1717 – 1787), son of regent Sukezane and adopted son of his nephew Tanemoto, was a kugyō or Japanese court noble of the Edo period (1603–1868). Michisaki was his son. He held court positions as follows:

- Kampaku (1778–1779)
- Sesshō (1779–1785)
- Daijō Daijin (1780–1781)
- Kampaku (1785–1787)

== Family ==
- Father: Kujō Sukezane
- Mother: Imperial Princess Mashiko (1669-1738)
- Children:
  - Kujō Michisaki
  - Matsudono Tadataka
