= Kujō Tanemoto =

Japanese kugyō

Kujō Tanemoto (九条 稙基; 1725–1743), son of Yukinori with Tokugawa Senhime (1706–1757), was a kugyō or Japanese court noble of the Edo period (1603–1868). He adopted his uncle Naozane as his son.
