= Nijō Nariyuki =

Japanese noble (1816–1878)

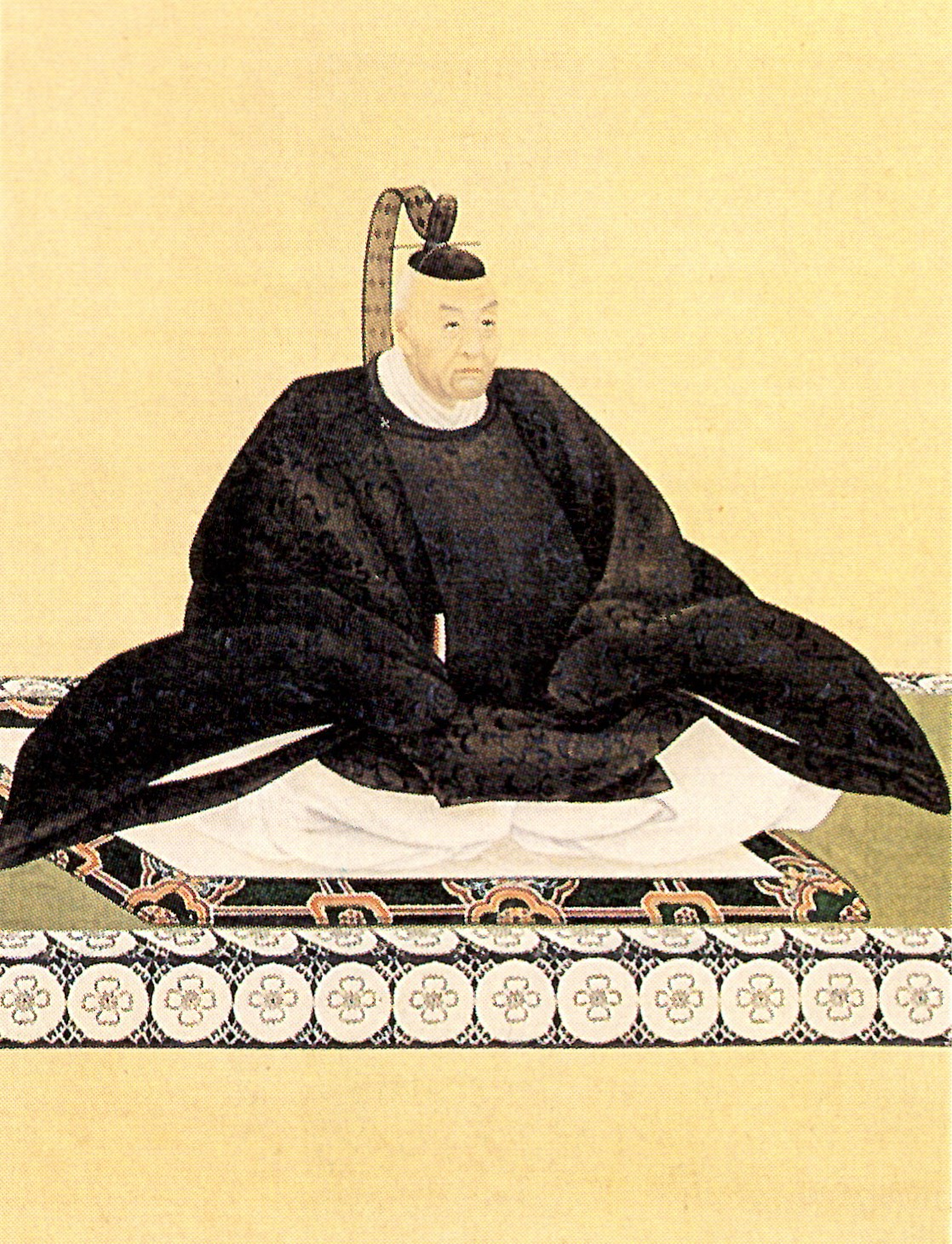
Nijō Nariyuki

Nijō Nariyuki (二条 斉敬; November 1, 1816 – December 5, 1878) was a Japanese kugyō (court noble) of the late Edo period and the early Meiji period. He was the last kampaku regent in Japanese history and the last sesshō as a subject. He was the 26th head of the Nijō family.

== Life ==
Nijō Nariyuki was born as the second son of Minister of the Left, Nijō Narinobu.

He held regent positions kampaku from January 31, 1864 to January 30, 1867 and sesshō from February 13, 1867, to January 3, 1868.

He adopted a son of Kujō Hisatada who became known as Nijō Motohiro. He also had son Nijō Masamaro.
