= Oichi =

Historical figure in the late Sengoku period (1547–1583)

Oichi-no-kata お市 Oichi
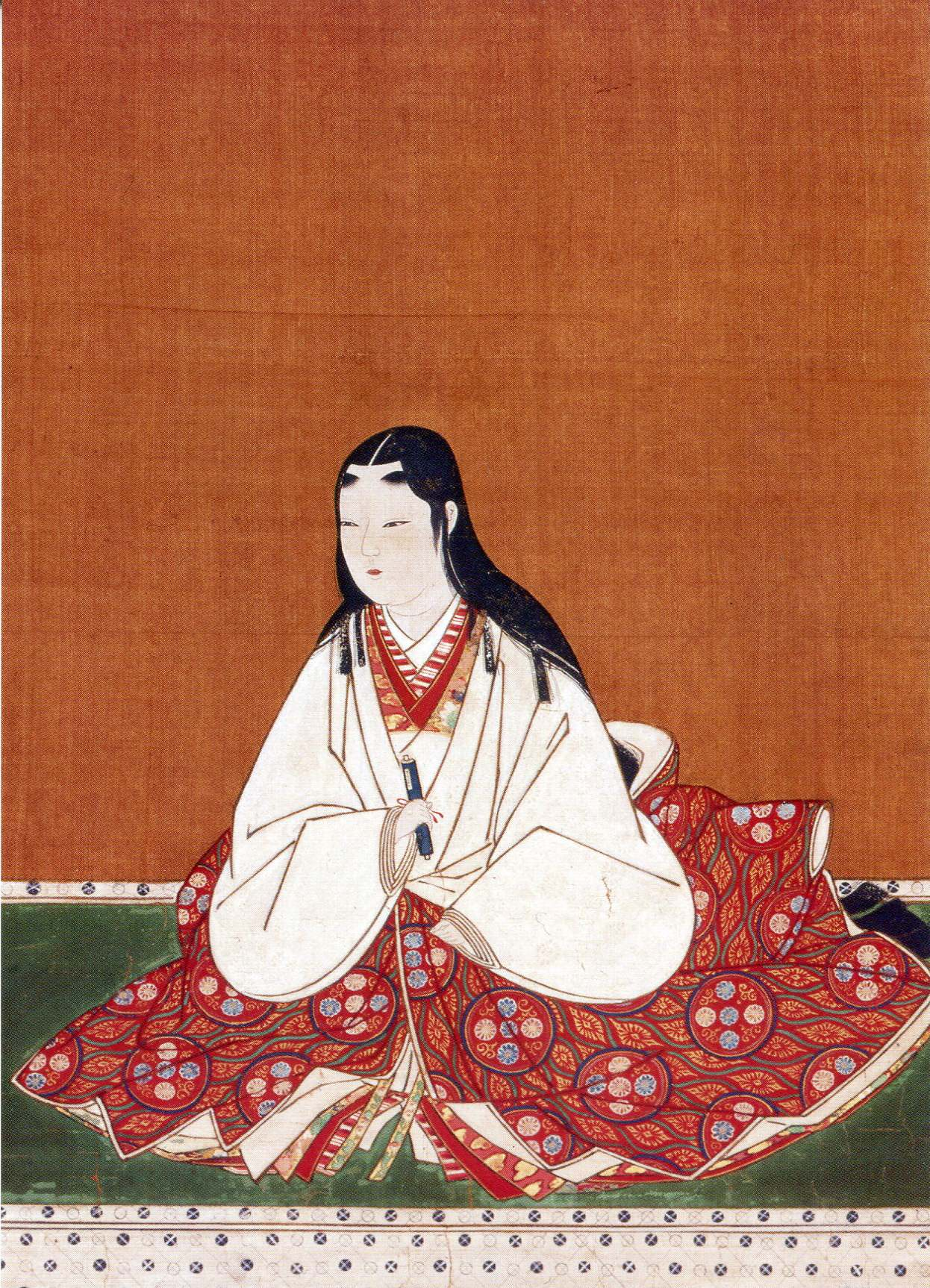
- Born: 1547
- Died: June 15, 1583 (aged 35–36); Kitanosho Castle in the Battle of Shizugatake
- Spouse(s): Azai Nagamasa; Shibata Katsuie
- Children: Chacha; Ohatsu; Oeyo; Manpukumaru
- Parents: Oda Nobuhide (father); Tsuchida Gozen (mother)
- Relatives: Oda clan Azai clan Owari-Shibata clan

Oichi (お市; 1547 – June 14, 1583) was a female historical figure in the late Sengoku period. She is known primarily as the mother of three daughters who became prominent figures in their own right – Yodo-dono, Ohatsu and Oeyo. Oichi was the younger sister of Oda Nobunaga; and she was the sister-in-law of Nōhime, the daughter of Saitō Dōsan. She was descended from the Taira and Fujiwara clans.

She was an influential figure in Japanese history in the Sengoku period. Although remembered mainly for her life as sister of Oda Nobunaga, Japan's first unifier since the Ōnin War, Oichi is also famous for her honorable conduct, her beauty and determination. She was present at two historically significant battles, the siege of Odani and the siege of Kitanosho, sieges that led to the extermination of the powerful Azai and Shibata clans, respectively.

== Biography ==
Oichi was born in 1547 in Nagoya Castle, Owari Province, the fifth daughter of Oda Nobuhide. She was the younger sister of Nobunaga and Oinu. Her mother was an unnamed concubine who was said to have also given birth to several of her siblings. Her other names include Ichihime (市姫), Odani no Kata (小谷の方), and Hideko (秀子). She was prized as a beauty of her time and was cherished by her older brother. She was intelligent and speculated to be slightly taller than most women of the age. Nobunaga once stated, "If Oichi was a man, she would make a fine warrior."

Following Nobunaga's conquest of Mino in 1567, Nobunaga arranged for Oichi, then twenty years old, to marry the rival warlord Azai Nagamasa, in an effort to cement an alliance. Nobunaga was very grateful for the marriage and paid for the ceremony entirely (traditionally, the expenses were meant to be shared). Oichi bore Nagamasa one son (Manjumaru) and three daughters – Yodo-dono, Ohatsu and Oeyo. The two clans prospered and worked well together until three years later. Seeing Nobunaga abuse the shogun's power, their relations grew sour and Nagamasa betrayed Nobunaga.

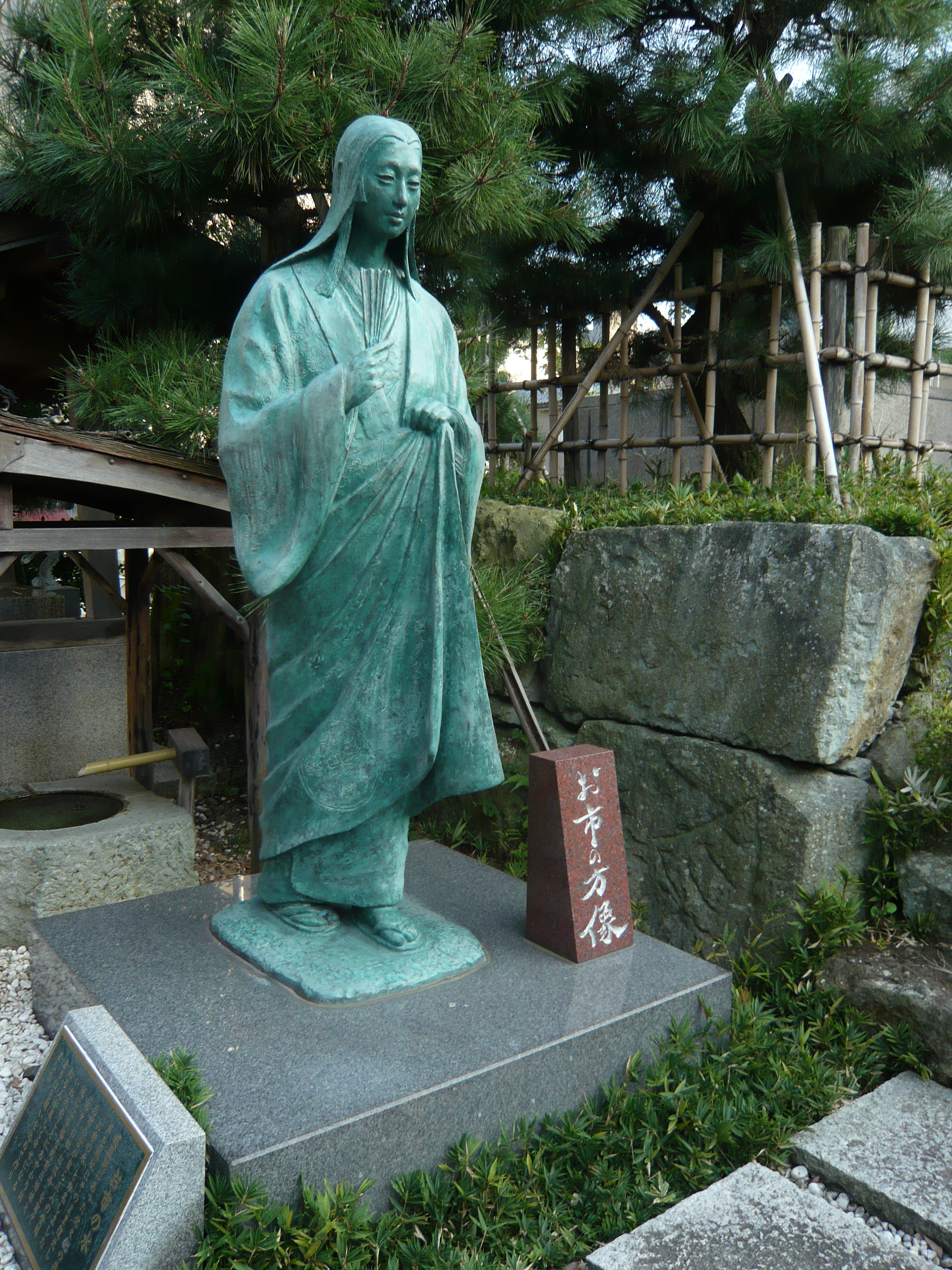
Statue of Oichi in Fukui.

In the summer of 1570, Nagamasa betrayed his alliance with Nobunaga and went to war with him on behalf of the Asakura family in the Battle of Anegawa. A story relates that Oichi sent her brother a sack of beans tied at both ends, ostensibly as a good-luck charm but in reality a warning that he was about to be attacked from both front and rear by the Asakura and Azai clans. According to the story, Nobunaga understood the message and retreated from his brother-in-law's assault in time.

The fighting continued for three years until the Asakura and other anti-Oda forces were destroyed or weakened. Oichi remained with her husband at Odani Castle throughout the conflict, even after Toyotomi Hideyoshi, a trusted vassal and general of Nobunaga at the time, began laying siege to the castle. In the Siege of Odani Castle, Nobunaga requested that his sister be returned to him before the final attack. Nagamasa agreed, sending out Oichi and her three daughters. Nagamasa had no hope of winning, and chose to commit seppuku.

Oichi and her daughters remained in the Oda family's care for the next decade. After Nobunaga was assassinated in 1582, his sons and vassals broke into two major factions, led by two of Nobunaga's favored generals, Shibata Katsuie and Hideyoshi. Nobunaga's third son, Nobutaka, belonged to the former group, and arranged for his aunt Oichi to marry Katsuie in order to ensure his loyalty to the Oda clan. But in 1583, Katsuie was defeated by Hideyoshi in the Battle of Shizugatake, forcing him to retreat to his home at Kitanosho Castle.

As Hideyoshi's army lay siege to the castle, Katsuie implored Oichi to flee with her daughters and seek Hideyoshi's protection. Oichi refused, insisting on dying with her husband after their daughters were sent away. Her daughters were placed in the care of Hideyoshi; the oldest daughter, Yodo-dono (also known as Chacha), eventually became one of Hideyoshi's concubines and the mother of his heir apparent Hideyori.

== Oichi's daughters ==
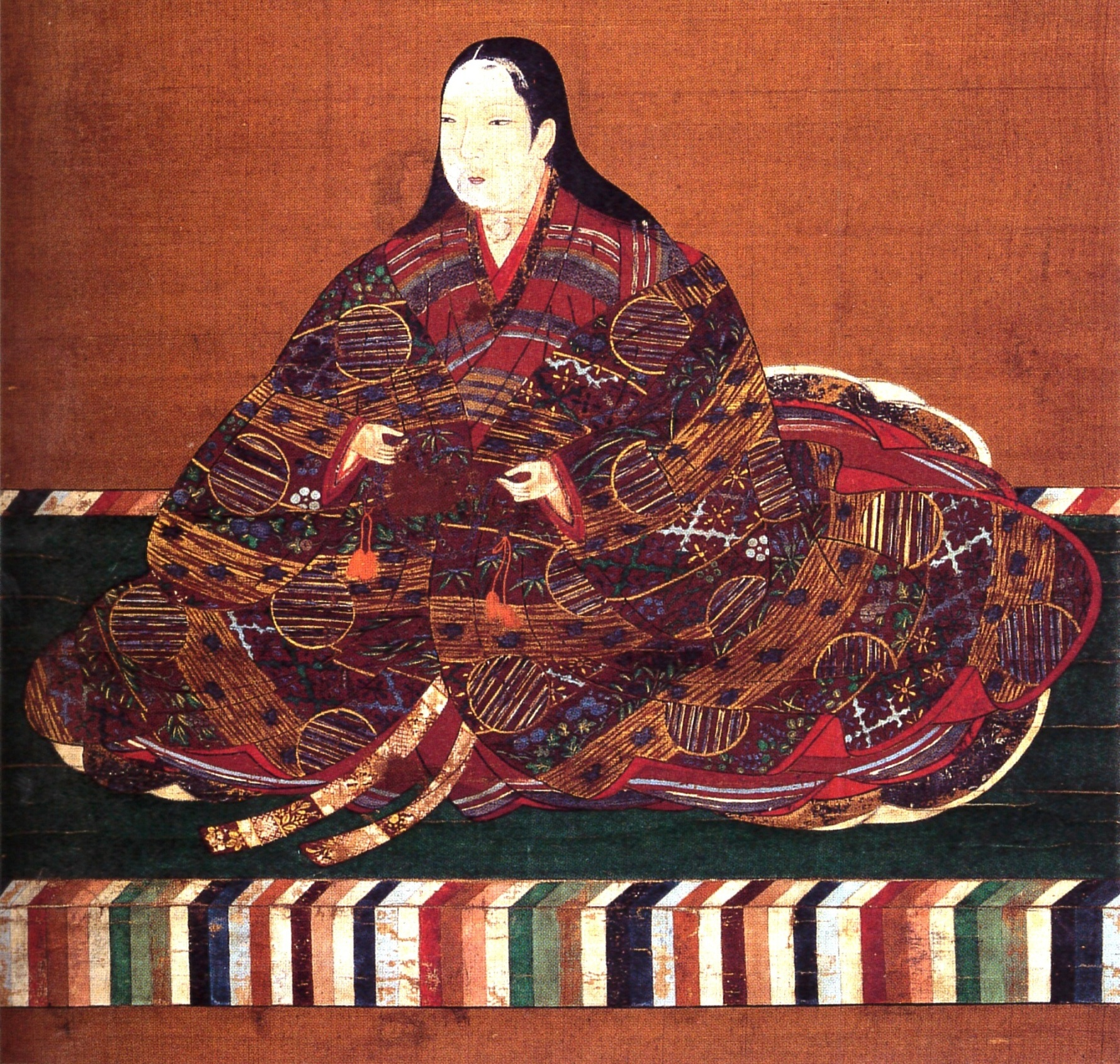
Yodo-dono

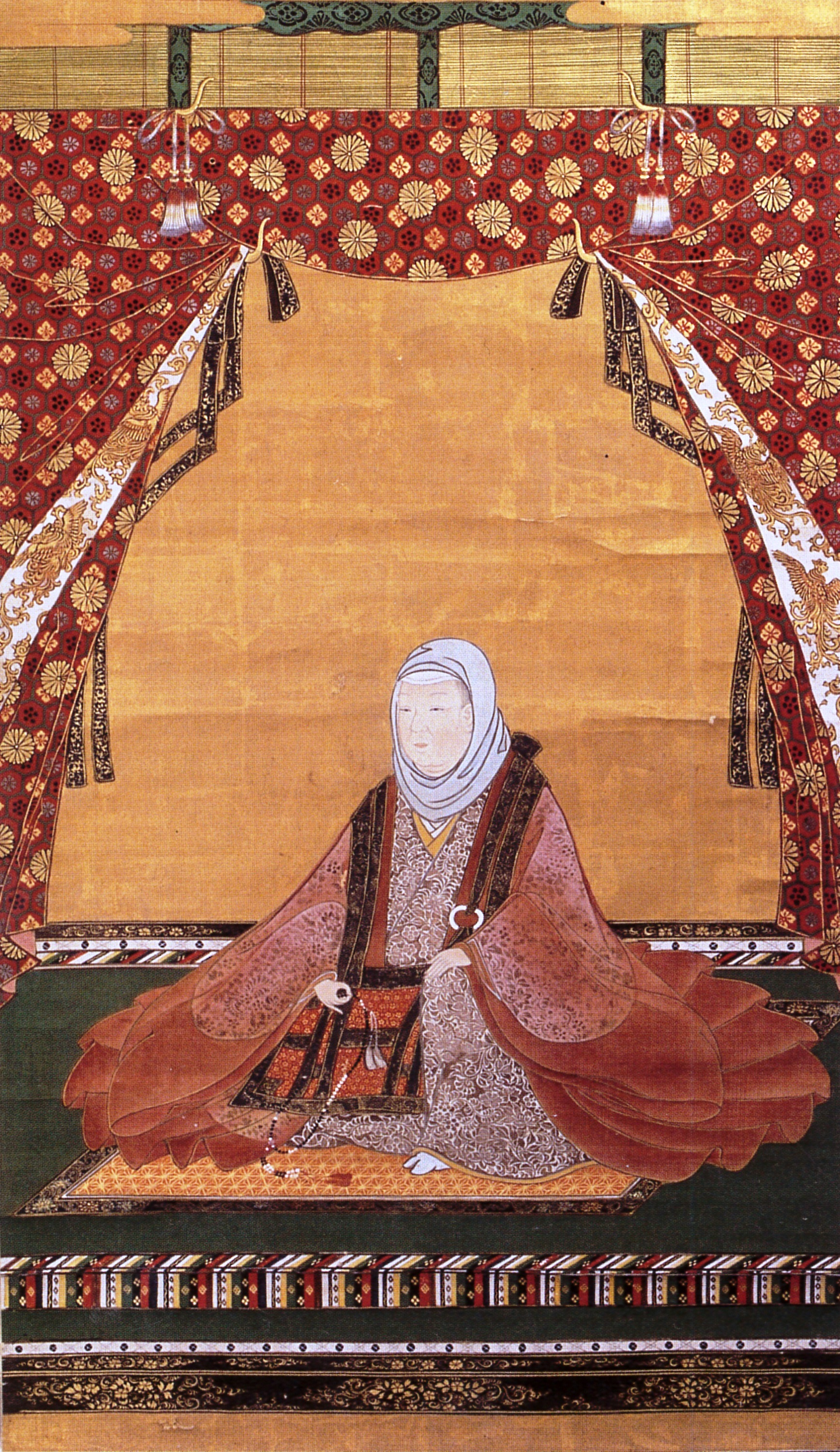
Ohatsu

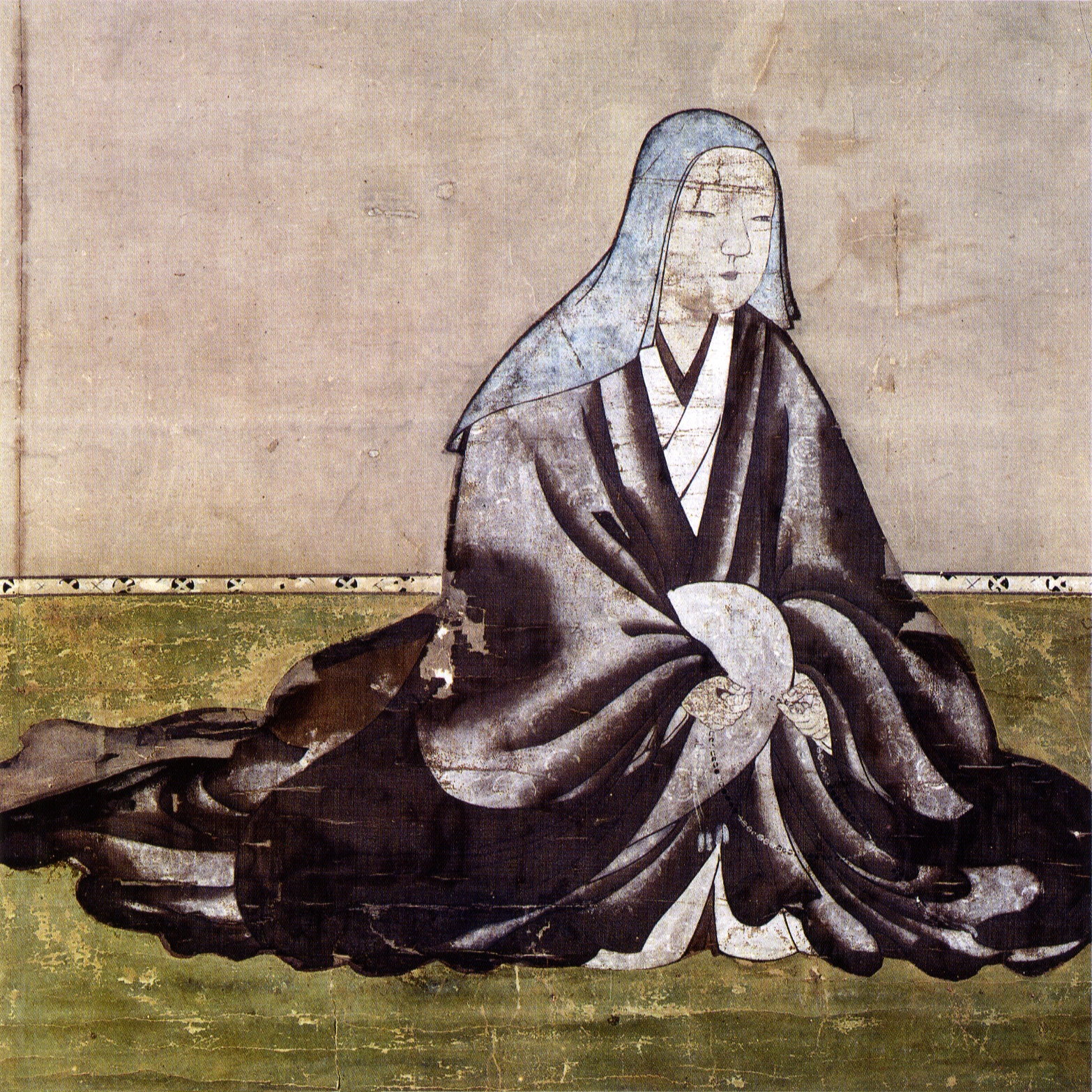
Oeyo

Oichi's three daughters each went on to become important historical figures in their own right. The eldest and the most famous, Chacha became a concubine to Hideyoshi, whose army had killed not only both her birth parents but also her stepfather. She became known as Yodo-dono or Yodogimi (from Yodo Castle, given to her by Hideyoshi), and was the mother of his only two sons, including his heir Hideyori. Yodo-dono and Hideyori later died in the siege of Osaka, in 1615, the final battle of the warring-states era.

The second, Ohatsu, married Kyōgoku Takatsugu, a man from a noble family once served by the Azai clan. The Kyogoku clan sided with Ieyasu after Hideyoshi's death, giving her the means to serve as an intermediary between Ieyasu and Yodo-dono. She worked in vain to end their hostilities, and after Yodo-dono and Hideyori's death, managed to save Hideyori's daughter by putting her in a convent.

The youngest, Oeyo (also called Ogō), married Tokugawa Hidetada, Ieyasu's heir and the second Tokugawa Shōgun. They had many children, including the third Shōgun Iemitsu, and Kazuko, consort to Emperor Go-Mizunoo. Kazuko's daughter Okiko became Empress Meishō, thus posthumously making Oichi both a grandmother to a Shōgun and a great-grandmother to an Empress.

== Personal information ==
Oichi was said to have been well loved by her family and their retainers, with Shibata Katsuie and Maeda Toshiie having been among her admirers. Likewise, it is believed that Nagamasa highly valued her as his precious wife. Based on what is known of her, people generally accept that she was faithful and loving to both her husbands.

She is said to have never liked Toyotomi Hideyoshi, which is possibly one of the reasons why she declined to be sent away while with Katsuie. Ironically, it is assumed Hideyoshi cared for her since he tried to save her and her children's lives.

== Family ==
- Father: Oda Nobuhide (1510–1551)
- Mother: Tsuchida Gozen (died 1594)
- Brothers
  - Oda Nobuhiro (died 1574)
  - Oda Nobunaga (1534–1582)
  - Oda Nobuyuki (1536–1557)
  - Oda Nobukane (1548–1614)
  - Oda Nagamasu (1548–1622)
  - Oda Nobuharu (1549–1570)
  - Oda Nobutoki (died 1556)
  - Oda Nobuoki
  - Oda Hidetaka (died 1555)
  - Oda Hidenari
  - Oda Nobuteru
  - Oda Nagatoshi
  - Oda Nobumitsu
- Sister:
  - Oinu
- Husbands:
  - Azai Nagamasa (1564–1573)
  - Shibata Katsuie (1582–1583)
- Children (By Nagamasa)
  - Chacha (1569–1615)
  - Hatsu (1570–1633)
  - Gö (1573–1626)
  - Manpukumaru (1563?–1573)
- Adopted sons (of Katsuie)
  - Shibata Katsutoyo
  - Shibata Katsumasa

== In popular culture ==
Oichi appears in Pokémon Conquest (Pokémon + Nobunaga's Ambition in Japan), with her partner Pokémon being Jigglypuff and Wigglytuff.

Oichi appears in Assassin's Creed Shadows as a potential romance option for Yasuke, one of the playable main characters.
