= Nijō Masamaro =

Baron Nijō Masamaro
- 二条 正麿
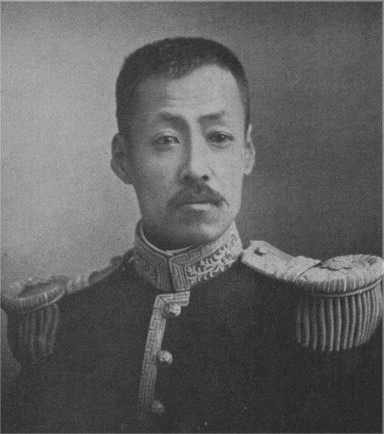

Member of the House of Peers
- In office 11 March 1905 – 18 February 1929 Elected by the Barons

Personal details
- Born: 9 January 1872
- Died: 18 February 1929 (aged 57)
- Children: Nijō Toyomoto; Nijō Tamemoto
- Parent: Nijō Nariyuki (father)
- Relatives: Nijō family
- Education: Tokyo Imperial University
- Occupation: Politician

Baron Nijō Masamaro (二条 正麿; 9 January 1872 – 18 February 1929), son of Nijō Nariyuki, was a Japanese politician who served as a member of House of Peers in the Meiji period. He was the father of Nijō Toyomoto (二条 豊基; 1909–1944) and Nijō Tamemoto (二条 弼基; 1911–1985). Tamemoto was adopted by Nijō Atsumoto.
