= Kujō Morotaka =

Kujō Morotaka (九条 師孝; 1688 – 1713), son of regent Sukezane, was a kugyō or Japanese court noble of the Edo period (1603–1868). His consort was a daughter of fourth head of Hiroshima Domain Asano Tsunanaga; Morotaka and she adopted his biological younger brother Yukinori as their son.
