= Tokugawa Hidetada =

Military leader of Japan from 1605 to 1623

Senior First Rank Tokugawa Hidetada
- 徳川 秀忠
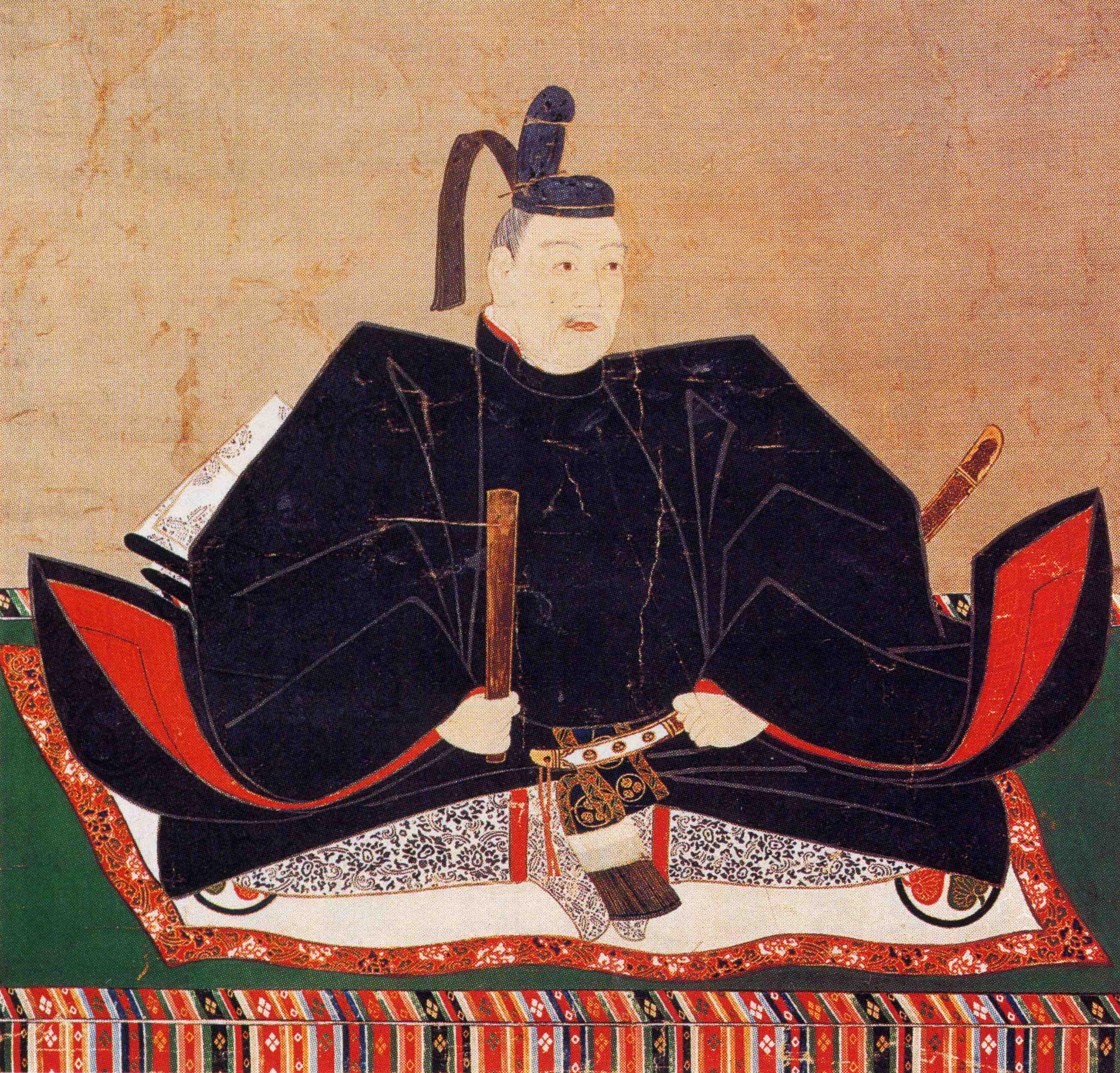

Shōgun
- In office 2 June 1605 – 23 August 1623
- Monarchs: Go-Yōzei; Go-Mizunoo
- Preceded by: Tokugawa Ieyasu
- Succeeded by: Tokugawa Iemitsu

Personal details
- Born: 2 May 1579 Hamamatsu, Shizuoka, Tokugawa clan
- Died: 14 March 1632 (aged 52) Edo, Tokugawa Shogunate (now Tokyo, Japan)
- Resting place: Taitoku-in Mausoleum
- Spouse(s): O-hime; Oeyo
- Children: Senhime; Tamahime; Katsuhime; Hatsuhime; Kazuhime; Chomaru (1601–1602); Tokugawa Iemitsu; Tokugawa Tadanaga; Tokugawa Masako; Hoshina Masayuki; among others...
- Parents: Tokugawa Ieyasu (father); Saigō-no-Tsubone (mother)
- Posthumous dharma name: Taitoku-in-den Kōren-jya Tokuyo Nyūsai Daikoji (台徳院殿興蓮社徳誉入西大居士)
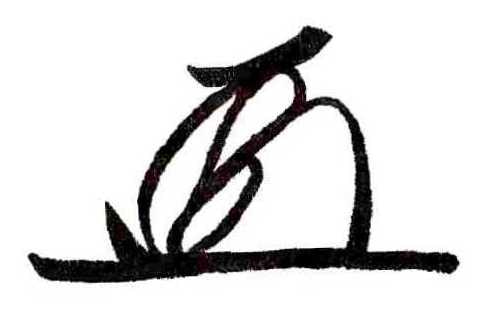
- Signature

Military service
- Allegiance: Tokugawa clan Eastern Army; Imperial Court; Tokugawa shogunate
- Unit: Tokugawa clan
- Battles/wars: Siege of Ueda; Siege of Osaka

Tokugawa Hidetada (徳川 秀忠; 2 May 1579 – 14 March 1632) was the second shōgun of the Tokugawa dynasty, who ruled from 1605 until his abdication in 1623. He was the third son of Tokugawa Ieyasu. Through his daughter Tokugawa Masako, he was also the maternal grandfather of Empress Meishō.

== Early life (1579–1593) ==
Tokugawa Hidetada was born to Tokugawa Ieyasu and the Lady Saigō on May 2, 1579. This was shortly before Lady Tsukiyama, Ieyasu's official wife, and their son Tokugawa Nobuyasu were executed on suspicion of plotting to assassinate Oda Nobunaga, who was Nobuyasu's father-in-law and Ieyasu's ally. By killing his wife and son, Ieyasu declared his loyalty to Nobunaga. In 1589, Hidetada's mother fell ill, her health rapidly deteriorated, and she died at Sunpu Castle. Later, Hidetada and his brother, Matsudaira Tadayoshi, were raised by Lady Acha, one of Ieyasu's concubines. His childhood name was Chomaru (長丸), later becoming Takechiyo (竹千代).

The traditional power base of the Tokugawa clan was Mikawa. In 1590, the new ruler of Japan, Toyotomi Hideyoshi enlisted Tokugawa Ieyasu and others in attacking the domain of the Hōjō in what became known as the Siege of Odawara (1590). Hideyoshi enlisted Ieyasu for this campaign by promising to exchange the five provinces under Ieyasu's control for the eight Kantō provinces, including the city of Edo. In order to keep Ieyasu from defecting to the Hōjō side (since the Hōjō and the Tokugawa were formerly on friendly terms), Hideyoshi took the eleven-year-old Hidetada as a hostage. In 1592 Hideyoshi presided over Hidetada's coming of age ceremony; it was then that Ieyasu's son dropped his childhood name, Takechiyo (竹千代), and assumed the name Hidetada. He was named the heir of the Tokugawa family, being the eldest surviving son of Ieyasu, and his favorite (since Ieyasu's eldest son had been previously executed, and his second son was adopted by Hideyoshi while still an infant). In 1593, Hidetada returned to his father's side.

In 1590, Hidetada married O-Hime (1585–1591), daughter of Oda Nobukatsu and adopted daughter of Toyotomi Hideyoshi. O-Hime died in 1591, and was given the posthumous Buddhist name Shunshoin. In 1595, Hidetada married Oeyo, daughter of Azai Nagamasa and adopted daughter of Toyotomi Hideyoshi. Their wedding was held in Fushimi Castle.

== Military achievements (1593–1605) ==
In 1595, Hidetada married Oeyo of the Oda clan and they had two sons, Tokugawa Iemitsu and Tokugawa Tadanaga. They also had several daughters, one of whom, Senhime, married twice. Another daughter, Kazuko hime, married Emperor Go-Mizunoo (descended from the Fujiwara clan).

Knowing his death would come before his son Toyotomi Hideyori came of age, Hideyoshi named five regents—one of whom was Hidetada's father, Ieyasu—to rule in his son's place. Hideyoshi hoped that the bitter rivalry among the regents would prevent any one of them from seizing power. But after Hideyoshi died in 1598 and Hideyori became nominal ruler, the regents forgot all vows of eternal loyalty and were soon vying for control of the nation. Tokugawa Ieyasu was one of the strongest of the five regents, and began to rally around himself an Eastern faction. A Western faction rallied around Ishida Mitsunari. The two factions clashed at the Battle of Sekigahara in 1600. Ieyasu won decisively, which set the stage for Tokugawa rule.

Hidetada had led 16,000 of his father's men in a campaign to contain the Western-aligned Uesugi clan in Shinano. Ieyasu then ordered Hidetada to march to Sekigahara in anticipation of the decisive battle against the Western faction. But the Sanada clan managed to tie down Hidetada's force, so he arrived too late to assist in his father's narrow but decisive victory. Ieyasu was incensed with Hidetada and was only convinced by his advisors not to punish his son. On 3 December 1601, Hidetada's first son, Chōmaru (長丸), was born to a young maiden from Kyoto named Onatsu. In September 1602, Chōmaru fell ill and died; his funeral was held at Zōjō-ji temple in Shiba.

In 1603 Emperor Go-Yōzei granted Ieyasu the title of shōgun. Thus Hidetada became the heir to the shogunate.

== Shōgun (1605–1623) ==
To avoid his predecessor's fate, Ieyasu established a dynastic pattern soon after becoming shogun by abdicating in favor of Hidetada in 1605. Ieyasu retained significant power until his death in 1616; but Hidetada nevertheless assumed a role as formal head of the bakufu bureaucracy.

Much to the dismay of Ieyasu, in 1612, Hidetada engineered a marriage between Sen, Ieyasu's favorite granddaughter, and Toyotomi Hideyori, who was living as a commoner in Osaka Castle with his mother. When this failed to quell Hideyori's intrigues, Ōgosho Ieyasu and Shogun Hidetada brought an army to Osaka.

In 1614–1615, at the Siege of Osaka, father and son once again disagreed on how to conduct this campaign against the recalcitrant Toyotomi forces in Osaka. In the ensuing siege Hideyori and his mother were forced to commit suicide. Even Hideyori's infant son (Kunimatsu), that he had with a concubine, was killed. Only the life of Sen was spared; she later remarried and had a new family.

After Ieyasu's death in 1616, Hidetada took control of the bakufu. He strengthened the Tokugawa hold on power by improving relations with the Imperial court. To this end he married his daughter Kazuko to Emperor Go-Mizunoo. The product of that marriage, a girl, eventually succeeded to the throne of Japan to become Empress Meishō. The city of Edo was also heavily developed under his reign.

Historian Michifumi Isoda opined that the total isolationism policy implemented by Hidetada gradually weakened the military of Japan under Tokugawa shogunate in the long run.

== Ogosho (1623–1632) ==
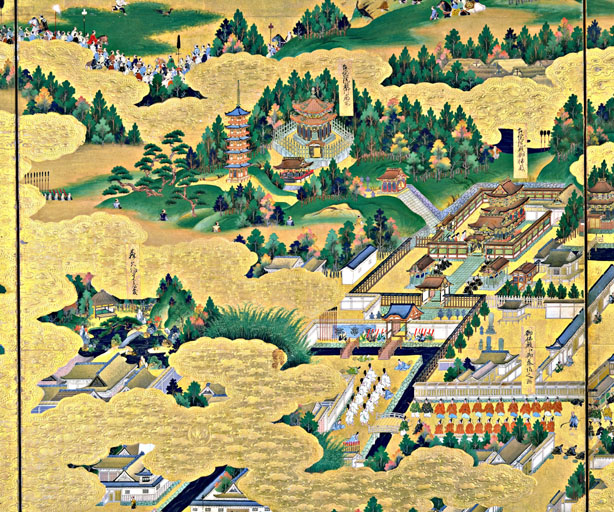
Shogun Iemitsu visiting Taitoku-in Mausoleum, as depicted in the Edo-zu byōbu screens (17th century)

In Genna 9 (1623), Hidetada resigned the government to his eldest son and heir, Tokugawa Iemitsu. Like his father before him, Hidetada became Ōgosho or retired shōgun, and retained effective power. He enacted anti-Christian measures, which Ieyasu had only considered: he banned Christian books, forced Christian daimyōs to commit suicide, ordered other Christians to apostatize under penalty of death; and executed fifty-five Christians (both Japanese and foreign) who refused to renounce Christianity or to go into hiding, by burning them along with their children, in Nagasaki in 1628.

Ōgosho Hidetada died in Kan'ei 9, on the 24th day of the 1st month (March 14, 1632). His Buddhist posthumous name is Daitoku-in (台徳院). His ashes were ceremoniously laid to rest in the Taitoku-in Mausoleum in Edo.

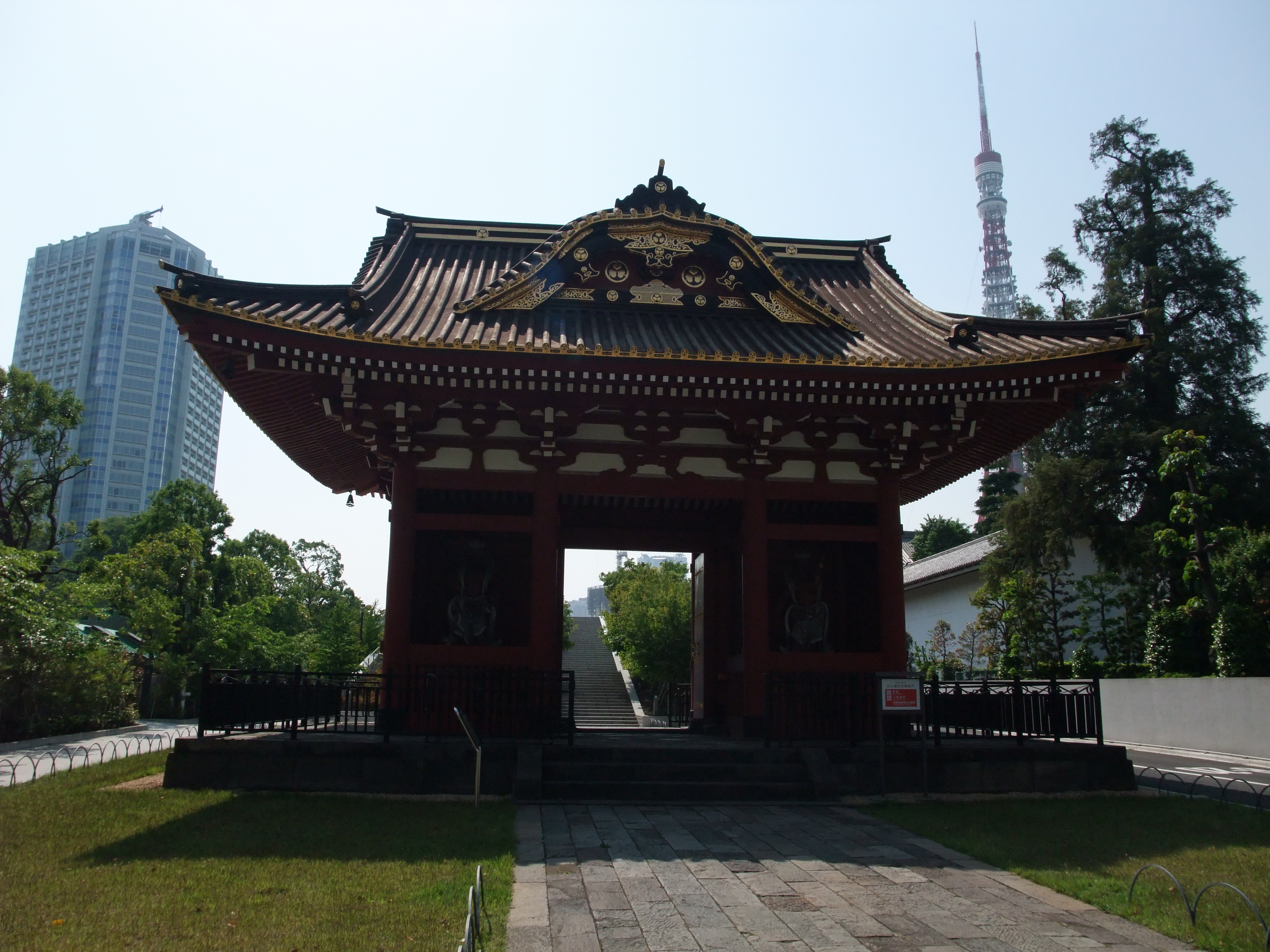
Taitokuin Mausoleum Gate located in Shiba park

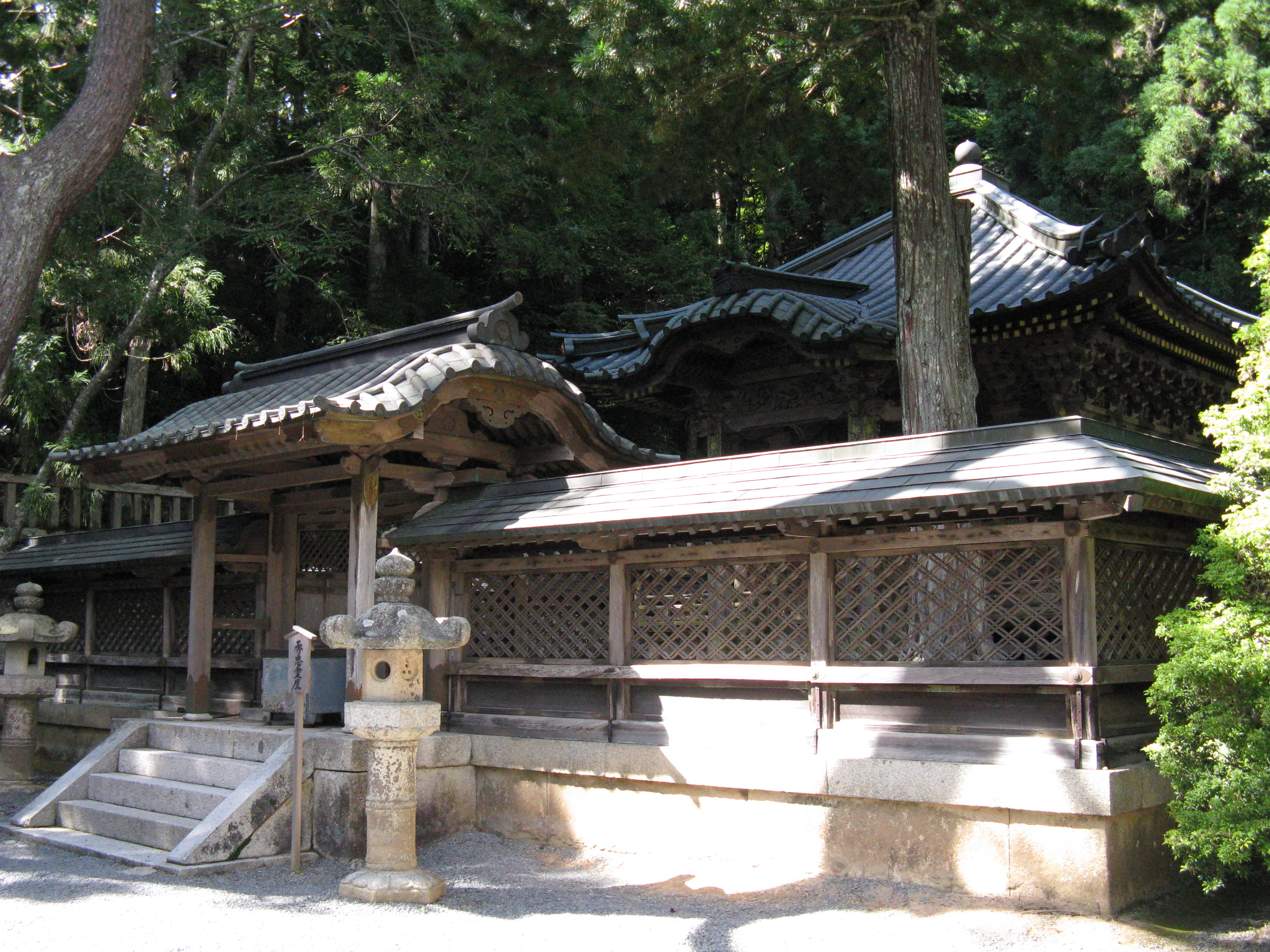

== Honours ==
- Senior First Rank (March 30, 1632; posthumous)

== Eras ==
The years in which Hidetada was shōgun are more specifically identified by more than one era name or nengō.

- Keichō (1596–1615)
- Genna (1615–1624)

== Family ==
=== Parents ===
Status	image	Name	posthumous Name	Birth	Death	Parents
Father		Tokugawa Ieyasu	Hogo Onkokuin	January 31, 1543	June 1, 1616	Matsudaira Hirotada; Odai no Kata
Mother		Saigō-no-Tsubone	Hōdaiin	1552	July 1, 1589	Tozuka Tadaharu; Saigo Masakatsu's daughter

=== Siblings (mother side) ===
Name	Posthumous Name	Birth	Death	Father	Marriage	Issue
Saigo Katsutada		1570		Saigō Yoshikatsu		
Toku-hime				Saigō Yoshikatsu		

=== Wives and concubines ===
Status	Image	Name	Posthumous Name	Birth	Death	Parents	Issue
First Wife (died before marriage)		O-Hime	Kantōin	1585	August 27, 1591	Oda Nobukatsu of Uda-Matsuyama Domain; Chiyo-Gozen (Kitabatake Tomonori’s daughter)	
Second Wife		Oeyo	Sūgen'in	August 1573	September 15, 1626	Azai Nagamasa; Oichi	Senhime married Toyotomi Hideyori later Honda Tadatoki of Himeji Domain; Tamahime (1599–1622) married Maeda Toshitsune of Kaga Domain; Katsuhime (1601–1672) married Matsudaira Tadanao of Fukui Domain; Hatsuhime (1602–1630) married Kyōgoku Tadataka of Matsue Domain; Tokugawa Iemitsu, 3rd shogun Tokugawa Tadanaga of Sunpu Domain; Kazuhime married Emperor Go-Mizunoo

=== Children ===
Image	Name	Posthumous Name	Birth	Death	Mother	Spouse	Issue
	Senhime	Tenjuin	May 26, 1597	March 11, 1666	Oeyo	First: Toyotomi Hideyori; Second: Honda Tadatoki of Himeji Domain	By Second: Katsuhime (1618–1678) married Ikeda Mitsumasa of Okayama Domain; Kochiyo (1619–1621)
	Tamahime	Tentoku-in	August 1, 1599	August 9, 1622	Oeyo	Maeda Toshitsune of Kaga Domain	Kametsuruhime (1613–1630) married Mori Tadahiro (1604–1633); Maeda Mitsutaka of Kaga Domain; Kohime; Maeda Toshitsugu (1617–1674) of Toyama Domain; Maeda Toshiharu (1618–1660) of Daishōji Domain; Manhime (1620–1700) married Asano Mitsuakira of Hiroshima Domain; Tomihime (1621–1662) married Imperial Prince Hachijō-no-miya Toshitada (1619–1662); Natsuhime (1622–1623)
	Katsuhime	Tensūin	June 12, 1601	March 20, 1672	Oeyo	Matsudaira Tadanao of Fukui Domain	Matsudaira Mitsunaga (1615–1707) of Takada Domain; Kamehime (1617–1681) married Imperial Prince Takamatsu-no-miya Yoshihito (1603–1638); Tsuruhime (1618–1671) married Kujō Michifusa
	Chomaru	Shutokuin	3 December 1601	September 1602	servant		
	Hatsuhime	Kōan-in	August 25, 1602	April 16, 1630	Oeyo	Kyōgoku Tadataka of Matsue Domain	
	Tokugawa Iemitsu, 3rd Shogun	Daiyūin-dono zosho	August 12, 1604	June 8, 1651	Oeyo	Takako (1622–1683), Takatsukasa Nobufusa’s daughter	By concubines: Chiyohime (1637–1699) married Tokugawa Mitsutomo of Owari Domain; Tokugawa Ietsuna, 4th Shogun; Kamematsu (1643–1647); Tokugawa Tsunashige of Kofu Domain; Tokugawa Tsunayoshi, 5th Shogun; Tsurumatsu (1647–1648)
	Tokugawa Tadanaga of Sunpu Domain	Bugan’in-dono	1606	January 5, 1634	Oeyo	Masako (1614–1690), Oda Nobuyoshi of Obata Domain	
	Kazuhime	Tofukumon’in	November 23, 1607	August 2, 1678	Oeyo	Emperor Go-Mizunoo	Empress Meisho; Second Princess (1625–1651) married Konoe Hisatsugu; Imperial Prince Sukehito (1626–1628); Prince Waka (1628); Imperial Princess Akiko (1629–1675); Imperial Princess Yoshiko (1632–1696) married Nijō Mitsuhira; Princess Kiku (1633–1634)
	Hoshina Masayuki of Aizu Domain	Hanitsu-reishin	June 17, 1611	February 4, 1673	Oshizu-no-Kata	First: Kunihime (1619–1637; Naito Masanaga {1568–1634} of Iwakitaira Domain); Second: Oman-no-Kata (1620–1691, Fujiki Hiroyuki's daughter)	By First: Komatsu (1634–1638); By second: Hoshina Masayori (1640–1657); Haruhime married Uesugi Tsunakatsu of Yonezawa Domain; Nakahime (1643–1649); Shogen (1645); Hoshina Masatsune (1646–1681) of Aizu Domain; Ishihime (1648–1667) married Inaba Masamichi of Sakura Domain; Kamehime (1650–1651); Fuhime (1649–1651); Hoshina Masazumi (1652–1671); By Concubines: Kikuhime (1645–1647); Sumahime (1648–1666) married Maeda Tsunanori of Kaga Domain; Kinhime (1658–1659); Matsudaira Masakata (1669–1731) of Aizu Domain; Sanhime (b.1673)

=== Adopted daughters ===
- Toyotomi Sadako (1593–1658) daughter of Toyotomi Hidekatsu with Oeyo, later married Kujō Yukiie and had 2 Sons: Nijō Yasumichi and Kujō Michifusa.(Hidekatsu was Oeyo's former husband who died in Japanese Invasions of Korea)
- Chiyohime (1597–1649), daughter of Ogasawara Hidemasa and Toku-hime (Tokuhime was daughter of Matsudaira Nobuyasu) and married Hosokawa Tadatoshi had 1 son: Hosokawa Mitsunao of Kumamoto Domain
- Katsuhime (1618–1678), daughter of Senhime with Honda Tadatoshi and married Ikeda Mitsumasa, had 1 son and 1 daughter: Ikeda Tsunamasa, Torihime
- Kamehime (1617–1681), daughter of Katsuhime with Matsudaira Tadanao and married Takamatsu no Miya Yoshihito-Shinnō
- Kisahime (1598–1656), daughter of Yūki Hideyasu and married Mōri Hidenari had 1 son: Mori Tsunanori of Chōshū Domain
- Binhime (1607–1652) daughter of Okudaira Iemasa of Utsunomiya Domain and married Horio Tadaharu had 1 daughter married Ishikawa Kadokatsu
- Furuhime (1607–1659), daughter of Ikeda Terumasa with Tokuhime (Tokuhime was Hidetada's sister) and married Date Tadamune had 2 sons and 1 daughter: Torachiyo, Date Mitsumune, and Nabehime married Tachibana Tadashige
- Tsuruhime (d. 1672), daughter of Sakakibara Yasumasa and married Ikeda Toshitaka of Himeji Domain had 1 son: Ikeda Mitsumasa
- Hisahime (1606–1628) daughter of Matsudaira Tadayoshi of Sekiyado Domain and married Kuroda Tadayuki of Fukuoka Domain
- Takashi-ho-in (1602–1656), daughter of Gamō Hideyuki with Furihime (Hidetada's younger sister) and married Kato Tadahiro of Kumamoto Domain had 1 son: Katō Mitsuhiro
  - daughter of Okada Mototsugu and married Soma Toshitane of Soma Nakamura Domain

== Ancestry ==
Ancestors of Tokugawa Hidetada

8. Matsudaira Kiyoyasu (1511–1535)
4. Matsudaira Hirotada (1526–1549)
9. Aoki
2. Tokugawa Ieyasu, 1st Tokugawa Shōgun (1543–1616)
10. Mizuno Tadamasa (1493–1543)
5. O-dainokata (1528–1602)
11. Keyōin (1492–1560)
1. Tokugawa Hidetada, 2nd Tokugawa Shōgun
6. Tozuka Tadaharu
3. Lady Saigō (1552–1589)
7. Saigō

== See also ==
- Aoi Tokugawa Sandai, a TV series about the life of Hidetada.

== Notes ==
Military offices
Preceded by Tokugawa Ieyasu	Shōgun: Tokugawa Hidetada; 1605–1623	Succeeded by Tokugawa Iemitsu
