= Kujō Michisaki =

Kujō Michisaki (九条 道前; 1746–1770), son of regent Naozane, was a kugyō or Japanese court noble of the Edo period (1603–1868). He married Kyohime, a daughter of Tokugawa Munekatsu, eighth head of Owari Domain, and the couple had a son Sukeie.
