= Nison-in =

Buddhist temple complex in Kyoto, Japan

Coordinates: 35.021209°N 135.667886°E

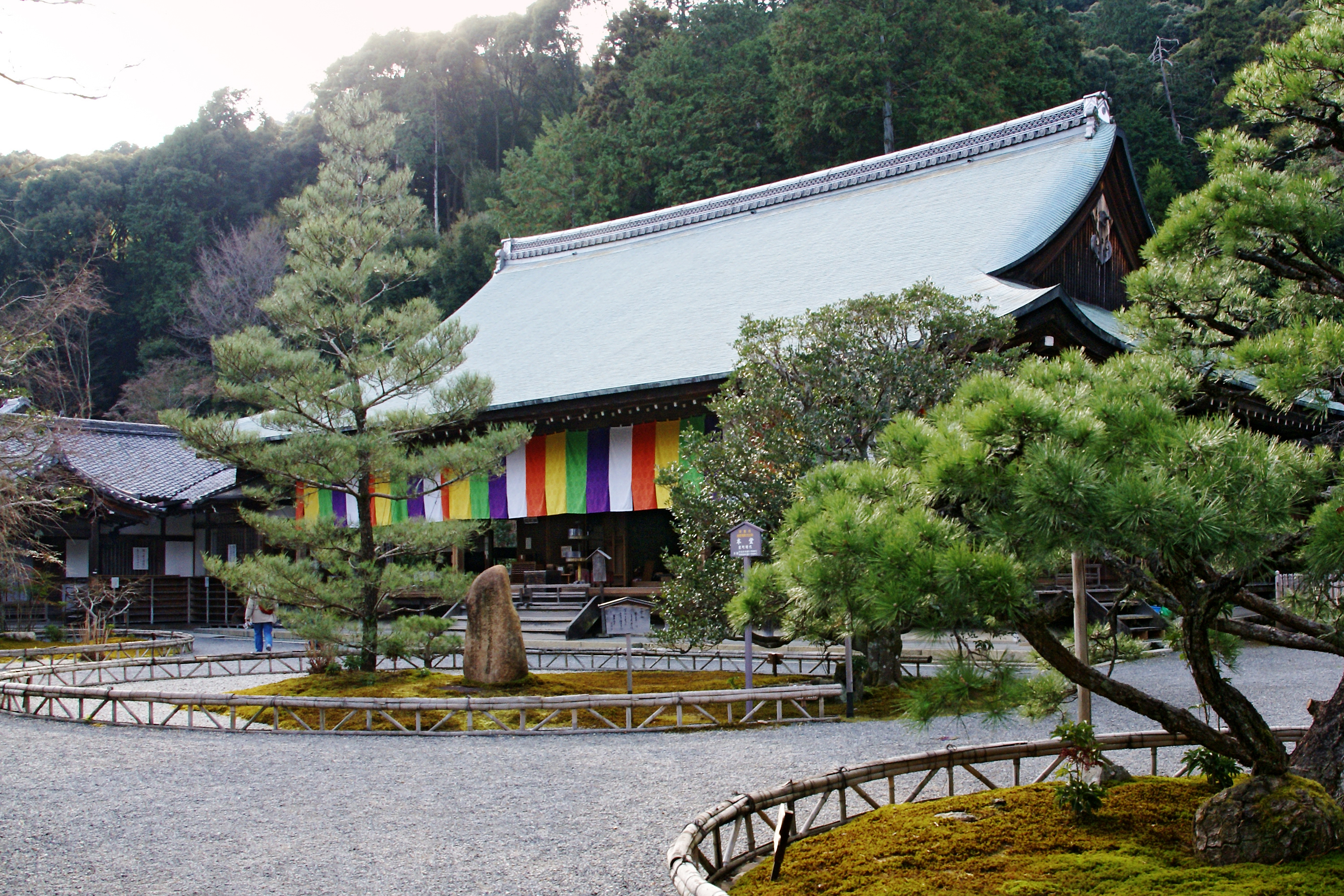
View of Nison-in's Main Hall in Sagano, Kyoto

Nison-in (二尊院, Nison-in) is a Tendai Buddhist temple complex in Ukyō-ku, a western ward in the city of Kyoto, Japan. The temple's official name is Ogura-yama Nison-kyō-in Keidai-ji (小倉山 二尊教院 華台寺). The temple is a popular destination during the Japanese maple viewing season (the momiji season).

== Two revered images ==
The temple derives its name from the fact that there are two main images here—one statue of the founding Buddha and another statue of one who has reached enlightenment; or in short, Nison refers to these "two revered images". Both of these Heian period Buddhist statues are designated as Important Cultural Properties of Japan.

The name Nison-in derives from the temple's two principal images, Shaka Nyorai (called the "Gautama Buddha of Hakken" who is said to send out the world's newborns), and Amitabha Tathagata (called the "Amitabha of Raigei" who is said to greet those who have died).

== History ==
Nison-in was founded in the early Heian period. Emperor Saga initiated the establishment of the temple in 834, and today it is part of the Enryaku-ji temple group. None of the original structures survived destruction during the Onin War (1467–1477).

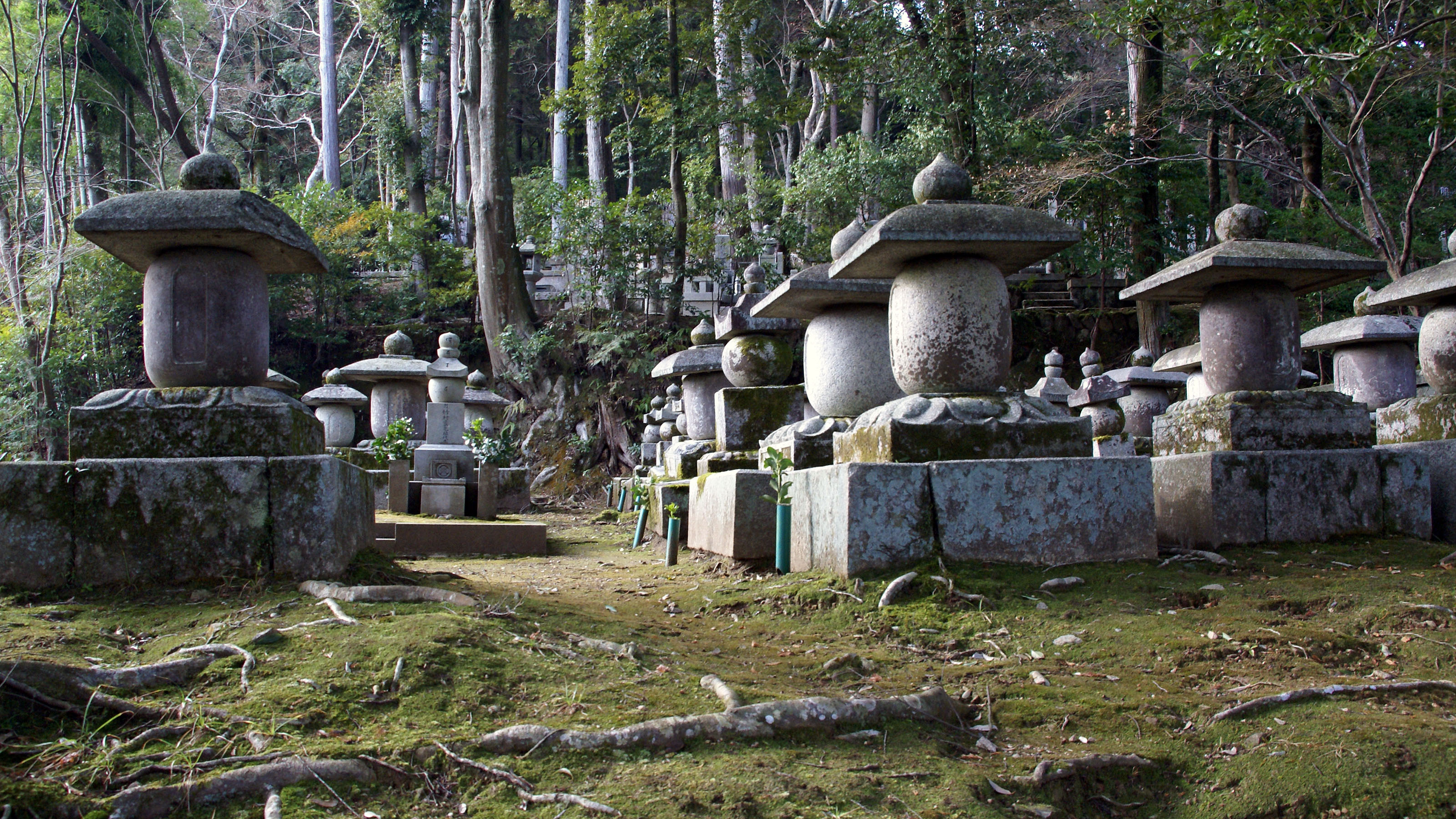
View of Nison-in's cemetery

Nison-in is renowned for its ancient cemetery, which includes the graves of emperors and members of the aristocracy. The father of Sanjōnishi Sanetaka is buried in Nison-in cemetery.

Nison-in became obliquely involved in the complex fabric of events which unfolded after Commodore Matthew C. Perry's Black Fleet sailed into Edo harbour in 1853. For the first time in more than two centuries, the Tokugawa shogunate actively sought advice from the emperor. Emperor Komei was asked for his counsel in deciding how to deal with newly assertive foreign powers. Amongst others, Naidaijin Sanjo Saki sought to uphold and defend the Imperial honor by trying to work with Tokugawa Nariaki in arguing against the conciliatory approach favored by Hayashi Akira and the bafuku negotiators. As an unanticipated consequence, Sanjo was ordered to retire to the life of a monk at Nison-in. Sanjo died while still in confinement at the temple. After learning of his death, Komei sent Imperial envoys to Nison-in to elevate the late-courtier to the posthumous rank of Udaijin.

== Karuta ==
This location of the temple on Mount Ogura is said to have been the site of a villa belonging to Fujiwara no Teika, the poet who compiled the anthology One Hundred Poems by One Hundred Poets (百人一首, Hyakunin Isshu).

Every year in May, the temple plays host to a re-enactment of a Heian-era literary card game played by women in period costume.

== See also ==
- Yasaka Shrine in Kyoto on January 3, when the “Ceremony of the first karuta play of the year” is held
