= Nijō Narinobu =

Japanese courtier (1788–1847)

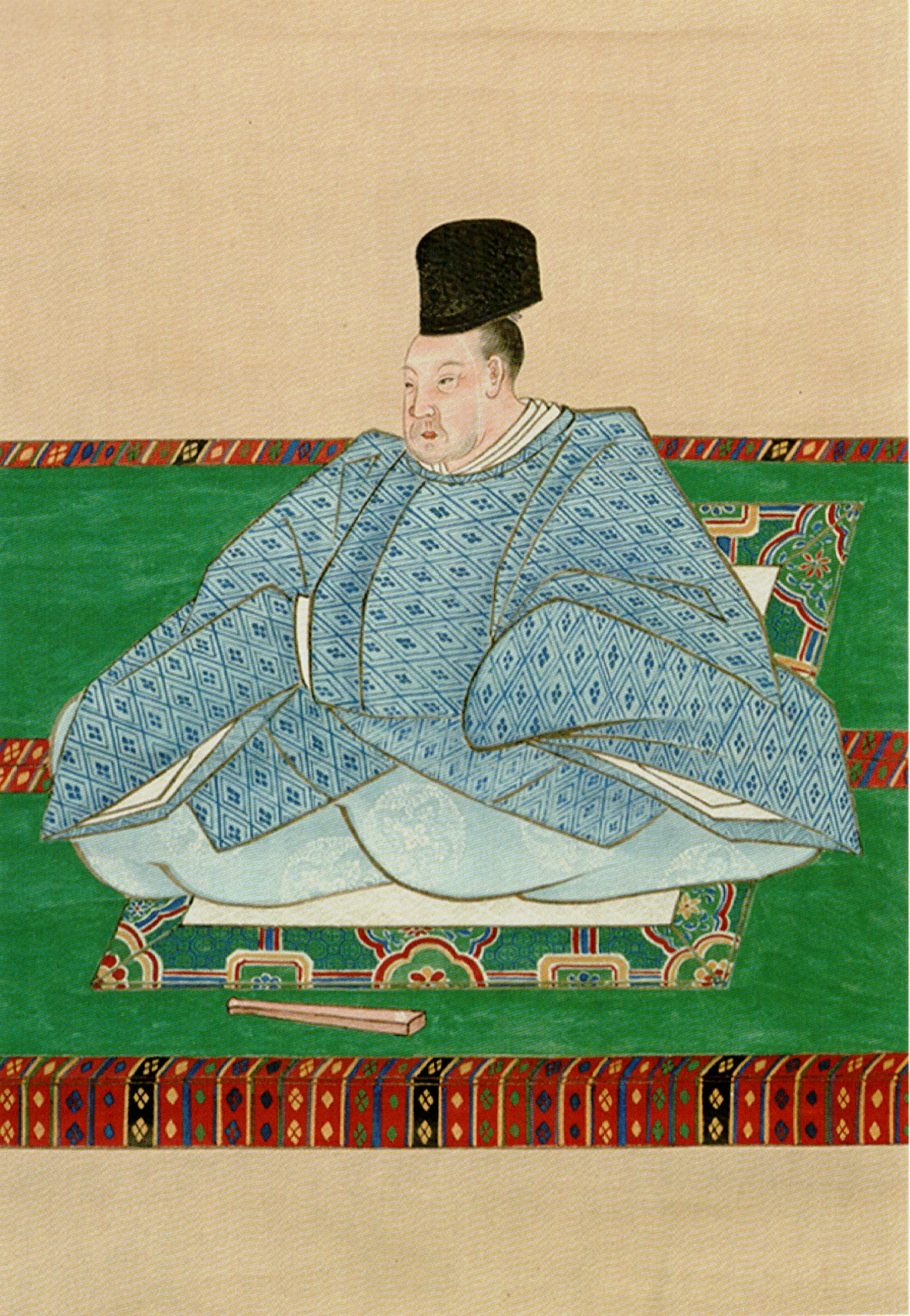

Nijō Narinobu (二条 斉信; April 10, 1788 – June 9, 1847), son of Nijō Harutaka, was a Japanese kugyō (court noble) of the Edo period (1603–1868). He married a Tokugawa Juko (1796-1844), daughter of the seventh head of Mito Domain Tokugawa Harutoshi. The couple had son Nijō Nariyuki, among others.
