= List of cultural properties of Japan – historical materials (Saga) =

This list is of the cultural properties of Japan designated in the category of historical materials (歴史資料, rekishi shiryō) for the Prefecture of Saga.

== National Cultural Properties ==
As of 1 January 2015, one Important Cultural Property has been designated, being of national significance.

Property	Date	Municipality	Ownership	Comments	Image	Coordinates	Ref.
Western Learning Materials of the Takeo Nabeshima Family 武雄鍋島家洋学関係資料; Takeo Nabeshima-ke yōgaku kankei shiryō	Edo period	Takeo	Takeo City Library (武雄市図書館)	2,224 items		33°11′20″N 130°01′25″E	

== Prefectural Cultural Properties ==
As of 1 January 2015, twelve properties have been designated at a prefectural level.

Property	Date	Municipality	Ownership	Comments	Image	Coordinates	Ref.
Taku Family Materials and Gotō Family Documents 多久家資料及び後藤家文書; Taku-ke shiryō oyobi Gotō-ke monsho	Heian period onwards	Taku	Taku City Museum (多久市郷土資料館)			33°15′26″N 130°05′18″E	
Hizen Nagoya Castle Byōbu 肥前名護屋城図屏風; Hizen Nagoya-jō zu byōbu	1590s	Karatsu	Saga Prefectural Nagoya Castle Museum	by Kanō Mitsunobu		33°31′40″N 129°52′13″E	
Materials of the Kashima Nabeshima Family 鹿島鍋島家史料; Kashima Nabeshima-ke shiryō	Edo to Meiji period	Kashima	Yūtoku Museum (祐徳博物館)	807 items		33°04′26″N 130°06′35″E	
Large Arita Ware Plate 染付有田職人尽し絵図大皿; Sometsuke Arita shokunin zukushi ezu ōzara	late Edo period	Arita	Arita Ceramic Art Museum (有田陶磁美術館)			33°11′25″N 129°53′55″E	
Large Plate from the Nabeshima Domain Kilns 染付鍋島藩窯絵図大皿; Sometsuke Nabeshima-han-yō ezu ōzara	Edo period	Saga	Saga Prefectural Museum			33°14′42″N 130°18′02″E	
Illustrated Industries of Hizen Province 肥前国産物図考; Hizen-koku sanbutsu zukō	1773-84	Saga	Saga Prefectural Museum	the eight scrolls show local industries including fishing, catching whales, hunting, horse-pasturing, pottery, coal mining, and paper-making		33°14′42″N 130°18′02″E	
Model Steam Train 蒸気車雛形 jōkisha hinakata	1855	Saga	Nabeshima Hōkōkai Foundation (公益財団法人鍋島報效会) (kept at the Historical Museum Chōkokan (徴古館))			33°15′05″N 130°18′05″E	
Model Paddle Steamer 蒸気船雛形（外輪船） jōkisen hinakata (gairinsen)	1855	Saga	Nabeshima Hōkōkai Foundation (公益財団法人鍋島報效会) (kept at the Historical Museum Chōkokan (徴古館))			33°15′05″N 130°18′05″E	
Model Steamer with Screw Propeller 蒸気船雛形（スクリュー船） jōkisen hinakata (sukuryū-sen)	1855	Saga	Nabeshima Hōkōkai Foundation (公益財団法人鍋島報效会) (kept at the Historical Museum Chōkokan (徴古館))			33°15′05″N 130°18′05″E	
Pair of Mortars モルチール砲 moruchīru-hō	1843 and later	Saga	Saga Castle History Museum (佐賀城本丸歴史館) (kept at the Saga Prefectural Museum)	the 1843 mortar was imported from Holland, the other produced in Japan		33°14′42″N 130°18′02″E	
Autograph Letter of Toyotomi Hideyoshi 豊臣秀吉自筆書状(五月廿二日／おね宛); Toyotomi Hideyoshi jihitsu shojō	1593	Karatsu	Saga Prefectural Nagoya Castle Museum	to his wife One (Kita-no-Mandokoro) on the twenty-second day of the fifth month of Bunroku 2		33°31′40″N 129°52′13″E	
Materials relating to Kō Kōzen and the Kō Family 洪家伝来洪浩然関係資料; Kō-ke denrai Kō Kōzen kankei shiryō	Momoyama to Edo period	Karatsu	Saga Prefectural Nagoya Castle Museum	92 items, 24 relating to Kō Kōzen and the remainder to the Kō family more generally		33°31′40″N 129°52′13″E	

== See also ==
- Cultural Properties of Japan
- List of National Treasures of Japan (historical materials)
- Hizen Province
- List of Historic Sites of Japan (Saga)
- List of Cultural Properties of Japan - paintings (Saga)
