= Kujō Michitaka =

Japanese noble (1839–1906)

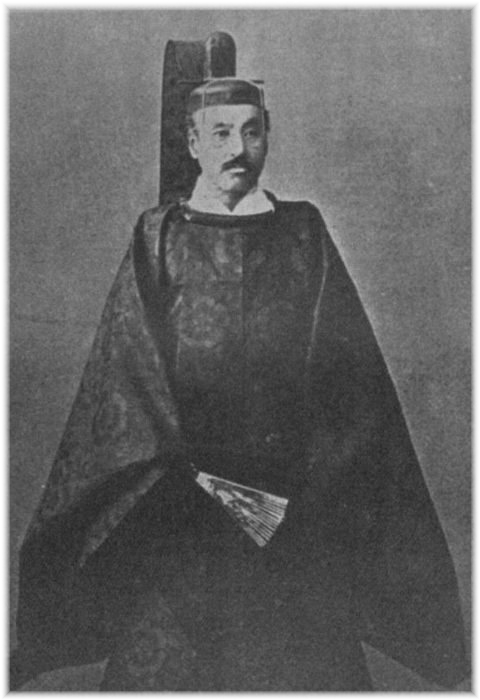
- Kujō Michitaka

Head of Kujō family
- Reign: 1859–1906
- Predecessor: Kujō Yukitsune
- Successor: Kujō Michizane

Minister of the Left
- Reign: 1867–1869
- Predecessor: Konoe Tadafusa
- Successor: Shimazu Hisamitsu
- Born: June 11, 1839
- Died: January 4, 1906 (aged 66)
- Issue: Kujo Noriko, Consort of Prince Yamashina Kikumaro; Wife of Ōtani Kōzui; Empress Teimei
- House: Kujō family
- Father: Kujō Hisatada; Foster Father: Kujō Yukitsune
- Mother: Karahashi Meiko

Kujō Michitaka (九条 道孝; June 11, 1839 – January 4, 1906), son of regent Kujō Hisatada and adopted son of his brother, Kujō Yukitsune, was a kuge or Japanese court noble of the late Edo period and politician of the early Meiji era who served as a member of the House of Peers. One of his daughters, Sadako married Emperor Taishō. He was the maternal grandfather of Emperor Showa.

In the bakumatsu period, Kujō supported the Shogunate policy as one of highest courtier of the imperial court and hence lost the power at the very beginning of Meiji restoration when the annihilation of the Shogunate was announced on January 3, 1868. His right to show at the imperial court was halted. Soon later in the same year he was rehabilitated and appointed head of the Fujiwara clan.

During the Boshin War, he had nominal leadership of the imperial army's Northern Pacification Command (奥羽鎮撫総督府), and spent the latter part of the war in northern Japan.

He was elevated to princedom in 1884 as head of the Kujō family, when the Meiji government founded the Kazoku peerage system. In the same year, he was appointed chief ritualist (掌典長) to the Imperial Household.

== Family ==
- Father: Kujō Hisatada
- Mother: Karahashi Meiko (1796–1881)
- Foster Father: Kujō Yukitsune (1823–1859)
- Wife: Sō Kazuko
- Concubine: Noma Ikuko
- Children:
  - Kujo Michizane (1870–1933)
  - Noriko (1878–1901) married Prince Yamashina Kikumaro by Ikuko
  - Kujo Sekiyuki
  - Kazuko (1882–1911) married Otani Kozui
  - Empress Teimei married Emperor Taishō by Ikuko
  - Ryuko married Shibutani Ryukyo
  - Kinuko married Otani Koaki

== Ancestry ==
Ancestors of Kujō Michitaka

16. Kujō Yukinori (1700-1728)
8. Nijō Munemoto (1727–1754)
17. Tokugawa Senhime
4. Nijō Harutaka (1754–1826)
2. Kujō Hisatada (1798–1871)
20. Higuchi Yasuhiro (1677-1723)
10. Higuchi Motoyasu (1706–1780)
21. Yoshida
5. Higuchi Nobuko (1751–1845)
1.Prince Kujō Michitaka
6. Shōbai
3. Karahashi Meiko (1796–1881)
