= Empress Dowager Eishō =

Empress Dowager Eishō 英照皇太后
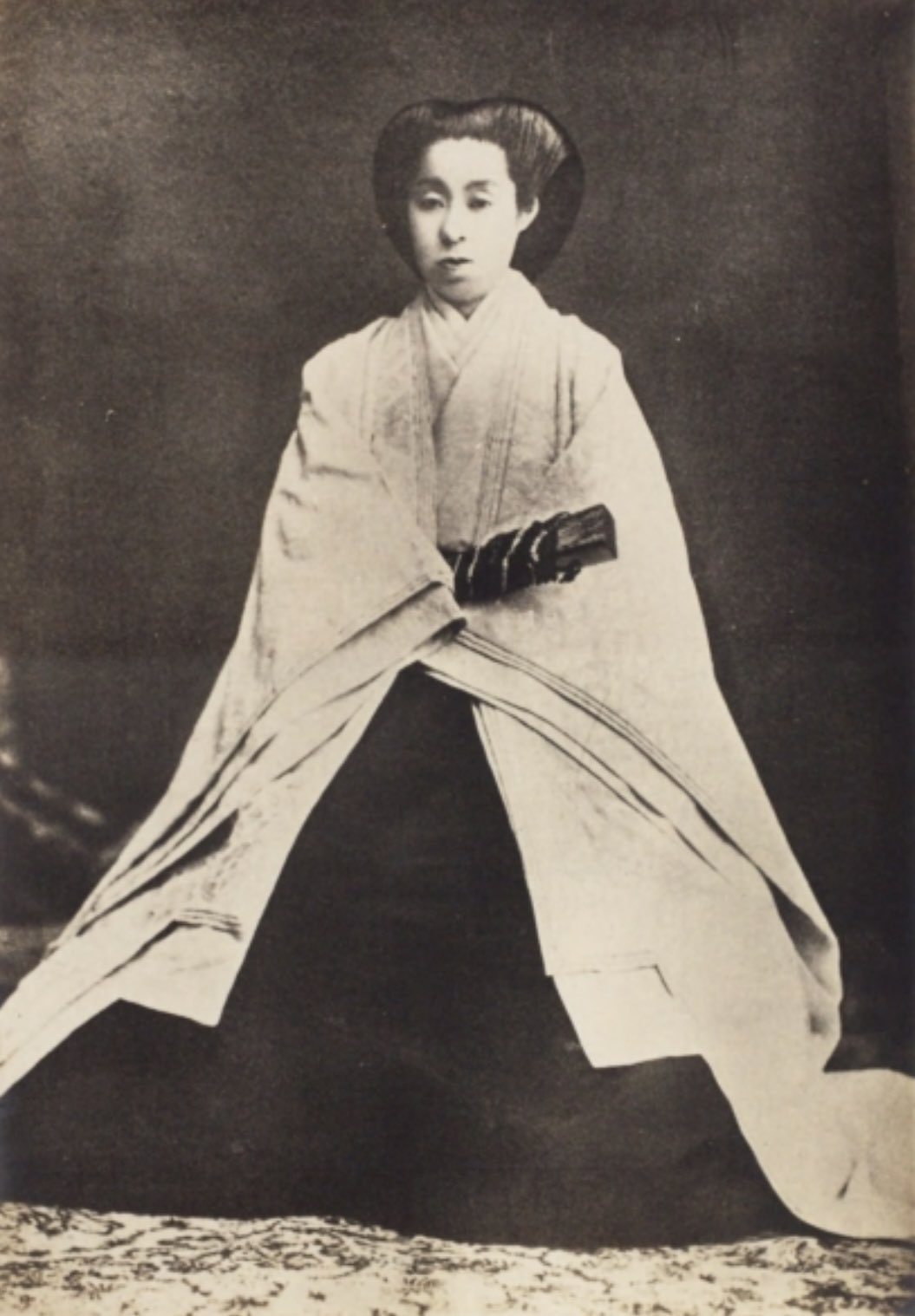

Empress dowager of Japan
- Tenure: 10 April 1868 – 11 January 1897
- Born: Asako Kujō (九条夙子); 11 January 1835; Shimogamo, Yamashiro, Japan
- Died: 11 January 1897 (aged 62); Akasaka, Tokyo, Japan
- Burial: Sennyū-ji, Higashiyama-ku, Kyoto, Japan
- Spouse: Emperor Kōmei
- Issue: Princess Yoriko; Princess Fuki
Posthumous name
- Empress Dowager Eishō (英照皇太后)
- House: Imperial House of Japan
- Father: Hisatada Kujō
- Mother: Karahashi Meiko
- Religion: Shinto

Asako Kujō (九条夙子, Kujō Asako; 11 January 1835 – 11 January 1897), posthumously honoured as Empress Dowager Eishō (英照皇太后, Eishō-kōtaigō), was the consort of Emperor Kōmei of Japan.

== Early life ==
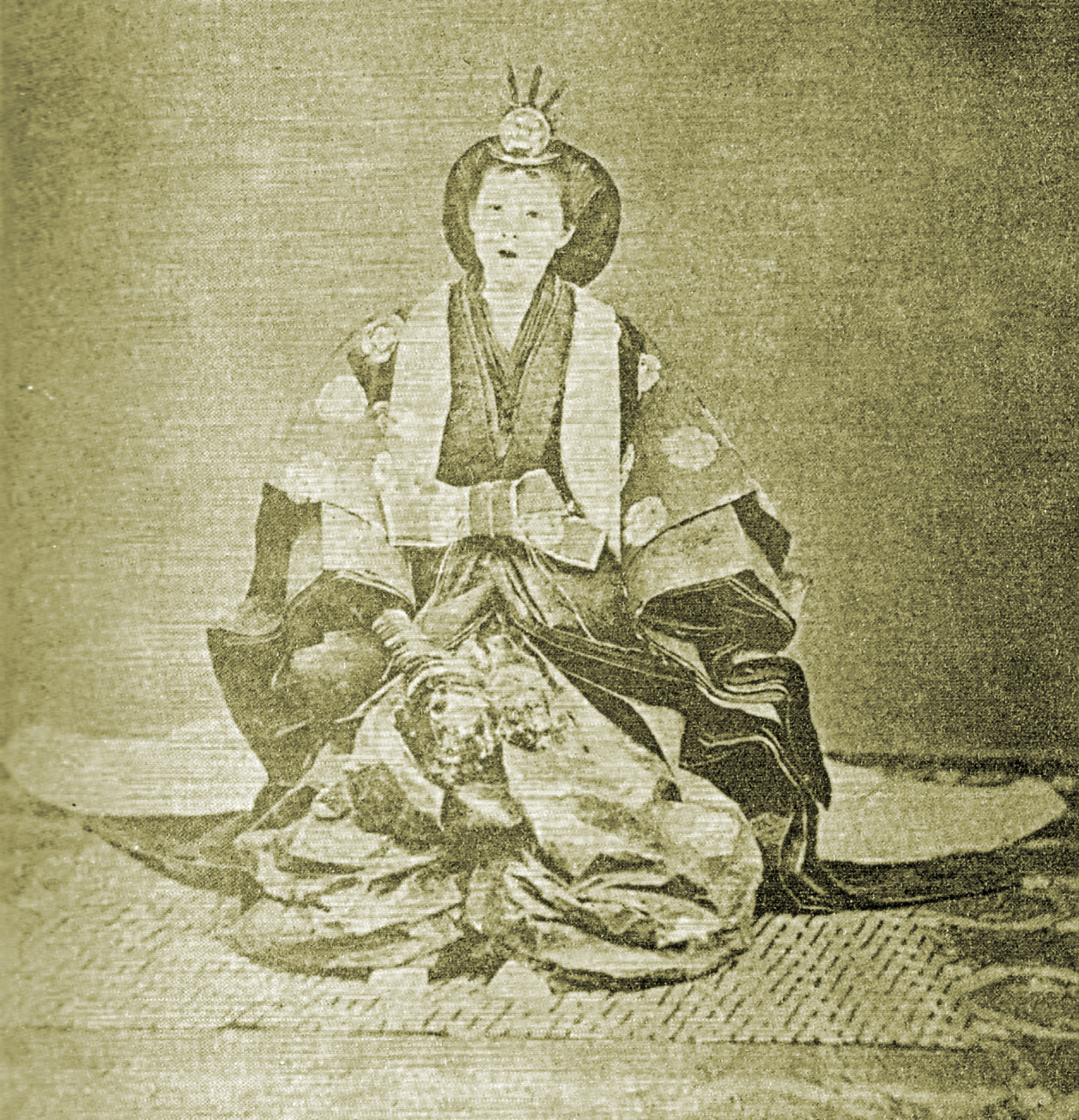
Asako Kujō

As the daughter of Hisatada Kujō, who was a former kampaku, Asako Kujō could anticipate a life unfolding entirely within the ambit of the imperial court; but she could not have anticipated the vast array of changes which the years would bring during her lifetime. At age 13, she was matched with Osahito. Upon the death of Emperor Ninkō in 1846, Osahito, who succeeded him as Emperor Kōmei, named her Nyōgo, a consort position of high honor to which princesses of the blood were appointed after the time of Emperor Kammu.

== Consort ==
Asako had two daughters, who both died in infancy; but she became the official mother of Emperor Kōmei's heir, Crown Prince Mutsuhito, later Emperor Meiji. He developed a strong emotional attachment to her, which became especially important in the unsettled period after Emperor Kōmei died unexpectedly.

== Empress dowager ==
Soon after the death of Emperor Kōmei, his successor Emperor Meiji conferred upon her the title of empress dowager; and she was given a posthumous name to go with her new title. This was a highly unusual gesture; and she was afterward known as Empress Dowager Eishō (英照皇太后, Eishō kōtaigō). This specific posthumous name was taken from the title of a poem, "Purple Wisteria over a Deep Pool," by a Tang dynasty poet; and it was deemed inappropriate for a daughter of the Kujō family as part of the Fujiwara ("Wisteria Field") clan. When the Meiji imperial court relocated from Kyoto to Tokyo, she followed, living first in the Akasaka Palace and then in the Aoyama Palace.

She died in 1897 during her 62th birthday and was buried at Senyū-ji, which is in Higashiyama-ku, Kyoto. Her memory is officially honored at her husband's mausoleum in Kyoto, which is known as Nochi-no-tsukinowa no higashiyama no misasagi.

Franz Eckert composed "Trauermarsch" ("Deep mourning" funeral march or "Kanashimi no kiwami") for the funeral of Empress Dowager Eishō.

Emperor Meiji and his wife could not attend the funeral, but they traveled to Kyoto to pay graveside respects in the spring after her death.

== Ancestry ==
Ancestors of Empress Dowager Eishō

16. Kujō Yukinori (1700-1728)
8. Nijō Munemoto (1727–1754)
17. Tokugawa Sen-hime
4. Nijō Harutaka (1754–1826)
2. Kujō Hisatada (1798–1871)
20. Higuchi Yasuhiro (1677-1723)
10. Higuchi Motoyasu (1706–1780)
21. Yoshida
5. Higuchi Nobuko (1751–1845)
1.Empress Eishō
6. Shōbai
3. Karahashi Meiko (1796–1881)

== See also ==
- Japanese empresses
- Ōmiya Palace

== Notes ==
Japanese royalty
Preceded by Takatsukasa Yasuko	Empress dowager of Japan; 1868–1897	Succeeded by Ichijō Masako
