= Nabeshima Naotada =

Final daimyō of Hasunoike in Hizen, before the Meiji Restoration in Japan

Senior Fifth Rank Nabeshima Naotada
- 鍋島直紀
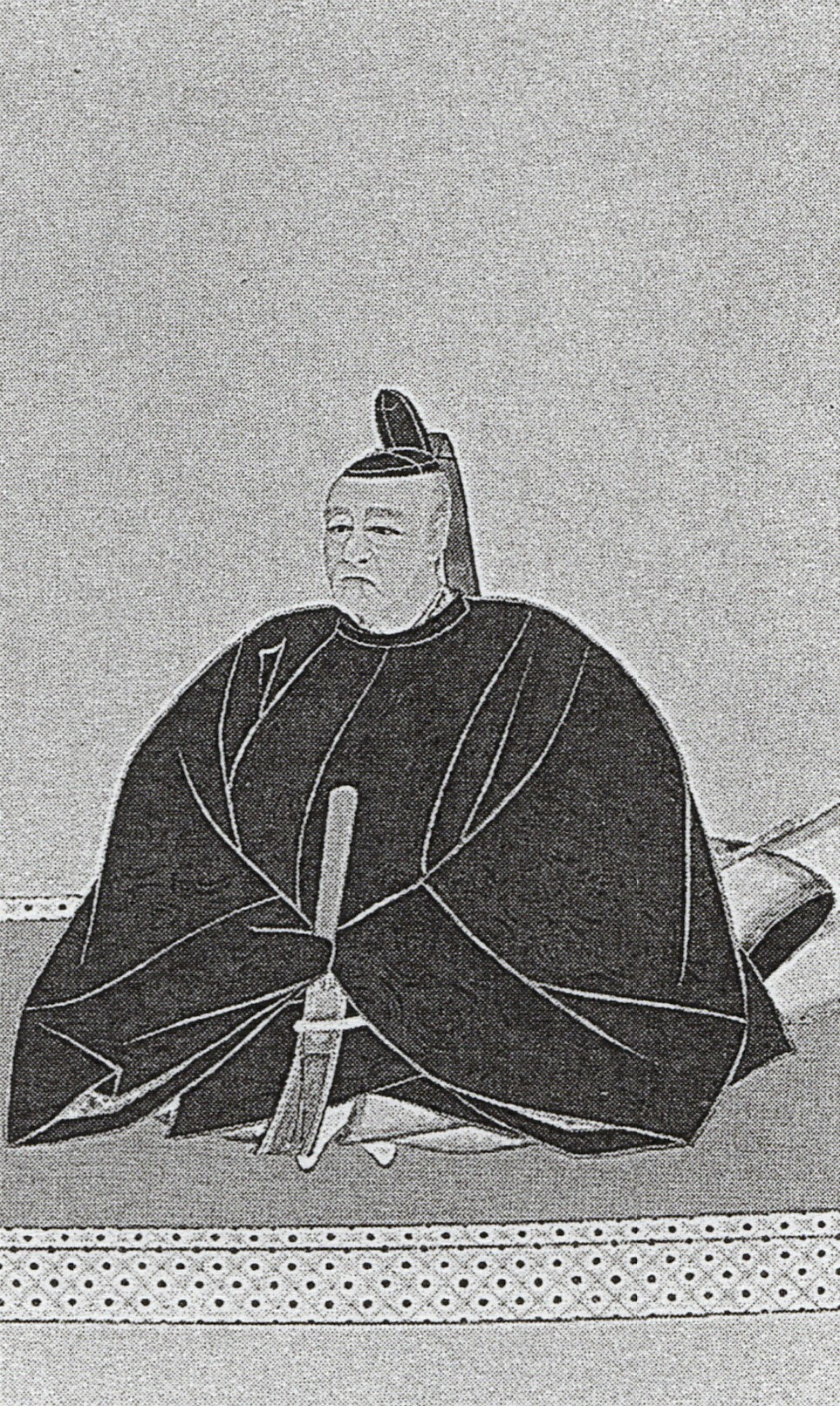

Daimyō of Hasunoike
- In office 1845–1869
- Preceded by: Nabeshima Naotomo
- Succeeded by: none

Personal details
- Born: June 30, 1826
- Died: February 23, 1891 (aged 64)

Nabeshima Naotada (鍋島 直紀; June 30, 1826 – February 23, 1891) was the 9th and final daimyō of Hasunoike Domain in Hizen Province, Kyūshū, Japan (modern-day Saga Prefecture). Before the Meiji Restoration, his courtesy titles were title of Kai no Kami and junior 5th, lower grade court rank (ju go i no ge, 従五位下).

== Biography ==
Naotada was the eldest son of Nabeshima Naotomo, the 8th daimyō of Hasunoike. His mother was the daughter of Nijō Harutaka. He attended the domain academy as a child, and on the retirement of his father on July 28, 1848, he became the 9th daimyō of Hasunoike Domain.

In 1854, he was ordered by the Tokugawa shogunate to take responsibility of the defenses of the Nagasaki area against possible incursions by foreign ships, and was forced to raise and train troops, and build coastal defense fortifications. This greatly strained the already precarious finances of the domain, which could only be resolved by placing the domain into great debt. In 1864, he was ordered to participate in the First Chōshū expedition, and contributed 1000 soldiers to the Tokugawa army. By order of his retired father, he also dispatched troops to Kyoto to assist the Tokugawa forces in keeping public order.

During the Boshin War of the Meiji Restoration, he switched sides to the Satchō Alliance and dispatched Hasunoike’s forces under the command of his younger brother, Ishii Tadami, against the Ōuetsu Reppan Dōmei at Akita in support of Emperor Meiji.

In 1869, he was appointed "domain governor" as the title of daimyō was abolished, and with the abolition of the han system and subsequent merger of Hasunoike into the new Saga Prefecture in 1871, he moved to Tokyo. In 1884, his adopted son became a viscount (shishaku) under the kazoku peerage. In April 1885, he was granted the courtesy title of senior 5th rank (shō go i, 正五位). He died at the clan’s Azabu residence in 1891, and his grave is at the Azabu Cemetery in Tokyo.

== Notes ==
Preceded by Nabeshima Naotomo	Daimyō of Hasunoike; 1845–1869	Succeeded by none (domain abolished)
