= Nabeshima Naoyuki =

Japanese daimyō

Daimyō of Hasunoike
- In office 1665–1708
- Preceded by: Nabeshima Naozumi
- Succeeded by: Nabeshima Naonori

Nabeshima Naoyuki (鍋島 直之; March 8, 1643 – June 8, 1725) was a Japanese daimyō of the early Edo period, who ruled the Hasunoike Domain in Hizen Province (modern-day Saga Prefecture).

Preceded by Nabeshima Naozumi	Daimyō of Hasunoike; 1660–1708	Succeeded by Nabeshima Naonori
