= Nijō Yoshitada =

Japanese court noble

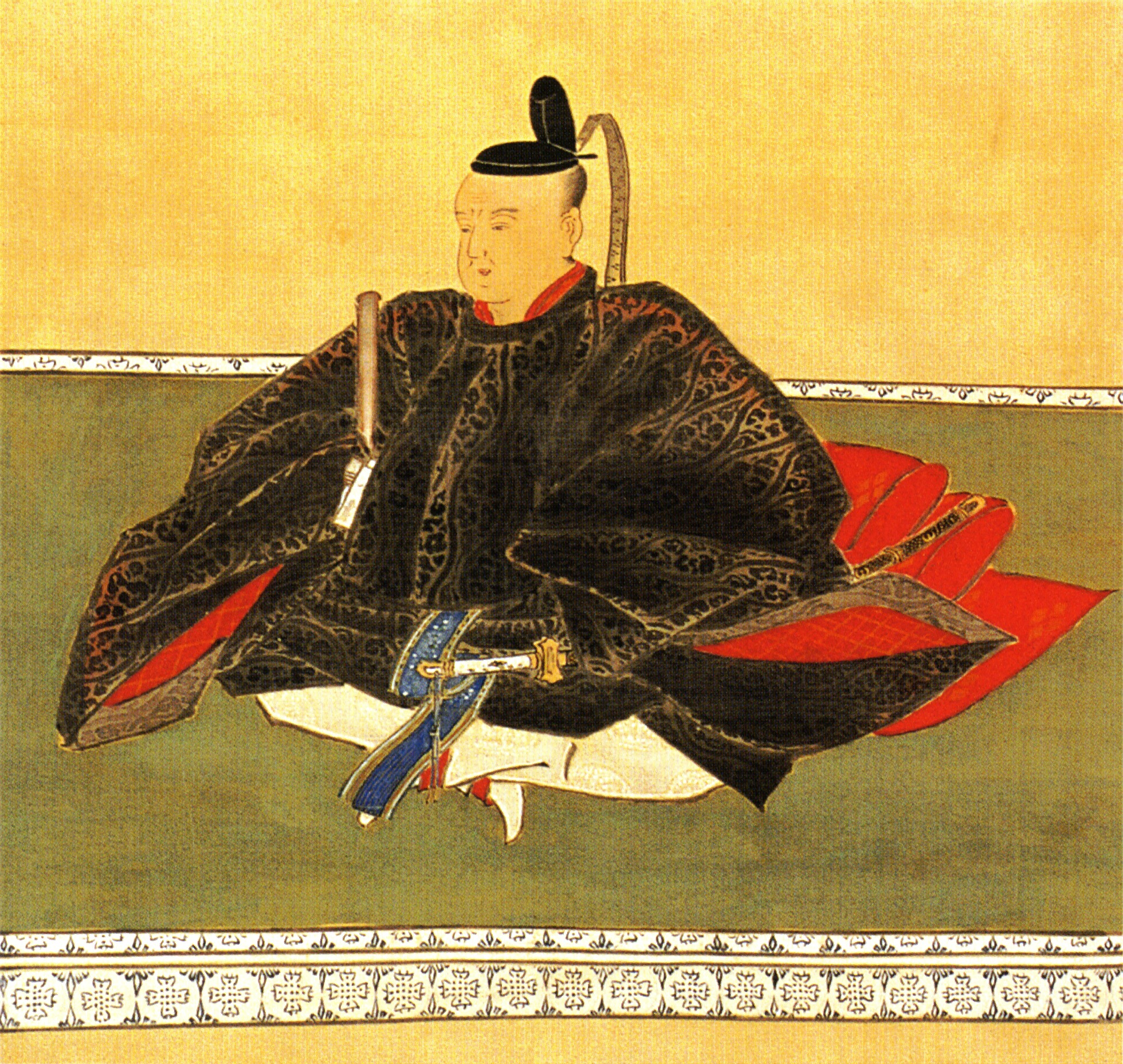
Portrait of Nijō Yoshitada, 18th century

Nijō Yoshitada (二条 吉忠; 26 September 1689– 28 August 1737), son of regent Nijō Tsunahira, was a Japanese kugyō (court noble) of the Edo period. He held a regent position kampaku from 1736 to 1737. He married a daughter of the fourth head of Kaga Domain Maeda Tsunanori. Nijō Munehira was his son. Also, one of his daughters was a consort of Emperor Sakuramachi.

== Family ==
Parents

- Father: Nijō Tsunahira (二条 綱平, 1672–1732)
- Mother: Imperial Princess Masako (1673–1746; 栄子内親王), daughter of Emperor Reigen and Empress Takatsukasa Fusako

Consorts and issues:

- Wife: Maeda Toshiko (前田 利子), also known as Naohime (直姫, 16 November 1693 – 24 January 1749), daughter of Maeda Tsunanori
  - Nijō Junko (二条淳子, 1713 – 1774) Wife of Imperial Prince Arisugawa-no-miya Yorihito (son of Emperor Reigen), first daughter
  - Nijō Ieko (二条舎子, 1716 – 1790), Empress Consort of Emperor Sakuramachi, second daughter
- Concubine: a Court lady (家女房)
  - Nijō Munehira (二条 宗熙, 27 December 1718 – 3 August 1738), first son
- Concubine: Lady Rinshōin (理性院)
  - Ruimyoin Rikuni (瑞妙院日護尼, 1717 – 1746, Nun at Zuiryū-ji (Toyama), third daughter
  - Takashi (隆遍, 1721 – 1777), Priest at Kōfuku-ji, second son
  - Yūjō (祐常, 1723 – 1773), third son
  - Nijō Yoshiko (二条喜子, 1728 – 1745), concubine of Nijō Munemoto (二条 宗基), fourth daughter
