= Harutaka =

- Gender: Male

Origin
- Origin: Japanese
- Meaning: Different meanings depending on the kanji used

Harutaka (written: 敏隆 or 治孝) is a masculine Japanese given name. Notable people with the name include:

- Nijō Harutaka (二条 治孝; 1754–1826), Japanese kugyō
- Harutaka Ono (大野 敏隆; born 1978), Japanese footballer
