= Kujō Hisatada =

Japanese noble (1798–1871)

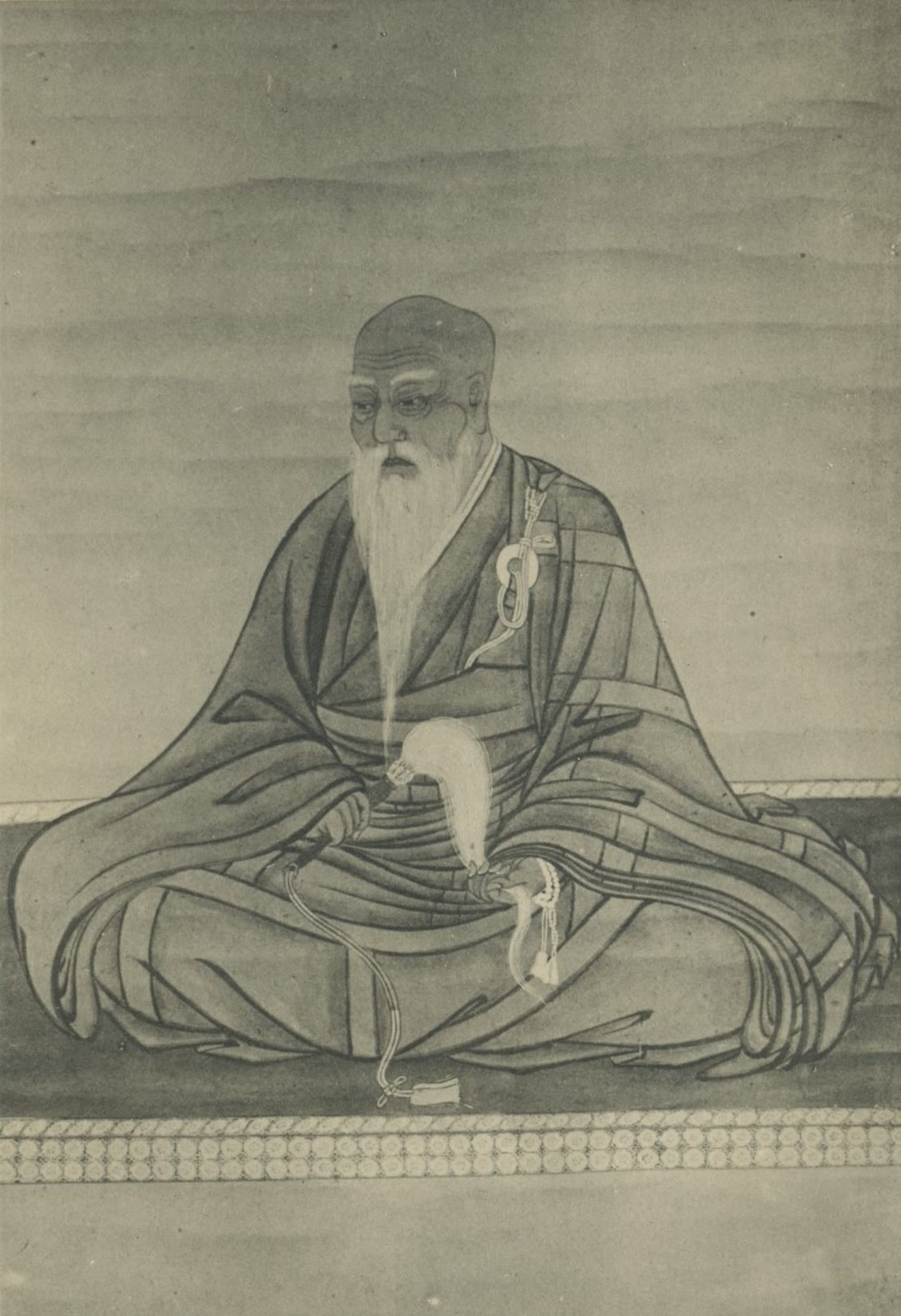
Kujō Hisatada

Kujō Hisatada (九条 尚忠; September 5, 1798 – October 5, 1871), son of Nijō Harutaka, was a kuge or Japanese court noble of the Edo period (1603–1868). He was adopted by his brother Suketsugu as his son. He held a regent position kampaku from 1856 to 1862, and retired in 1863, becoming a buddhist monk.

== Family ==
- Father: Nijō Harutaka
- Mother: Higuchi Nobuko
- Wife: Karahashi Meiko (1796–1881)
- Concubine: unknown
- Children:
  - Empress Dowager Eishō by Meiko
  - Kujō Michitaka by Meiko
  - Matsuzono Hisayoshi by Concubine
  - Tsurudono Tadayoshi (1853–1895) by Concubine
  - Takatsukasa Hiromichi by Concubine
  - Nijō Motohiro by Concubine
- Adopted son: Kujō Yukitsune (1823–1859) adopted by Meiko

== Ancestry ==
Ancestors of Kujō Hisatada

16. Kujō Sukezane (1669-1729)
8.Kujō Yukinori (1700-1728)
4. Nijō Munemoto (1727–1754)
18. Tokugawa Yoshimichi, 4th daimyō of Owari (1689-1713)
9. Tokugawa Sen-hime
19. Osan no Kata
2. Nijō Harutaka (1754–1826)
1.Kujō Hisatada
24. Higuchi Nobuyasu (1623-1691)
12.Higuchi Yasuhiro (1677-1723)
25. Bō
6.Higuchi Motoyasu (1706–1780)
26. Yoshida Kaneyuki (1653-1732)
13.Yoshida
27. Hanazono
3. Higuchi Nobuko (1751–1845)

== Title ==
Preceded by Takatsukasa Masamichi	Kampaku; 1856–1862	Succeeded by Konoe Tadahiro
