= Nabeshima Naooki =

Japanese daimyō

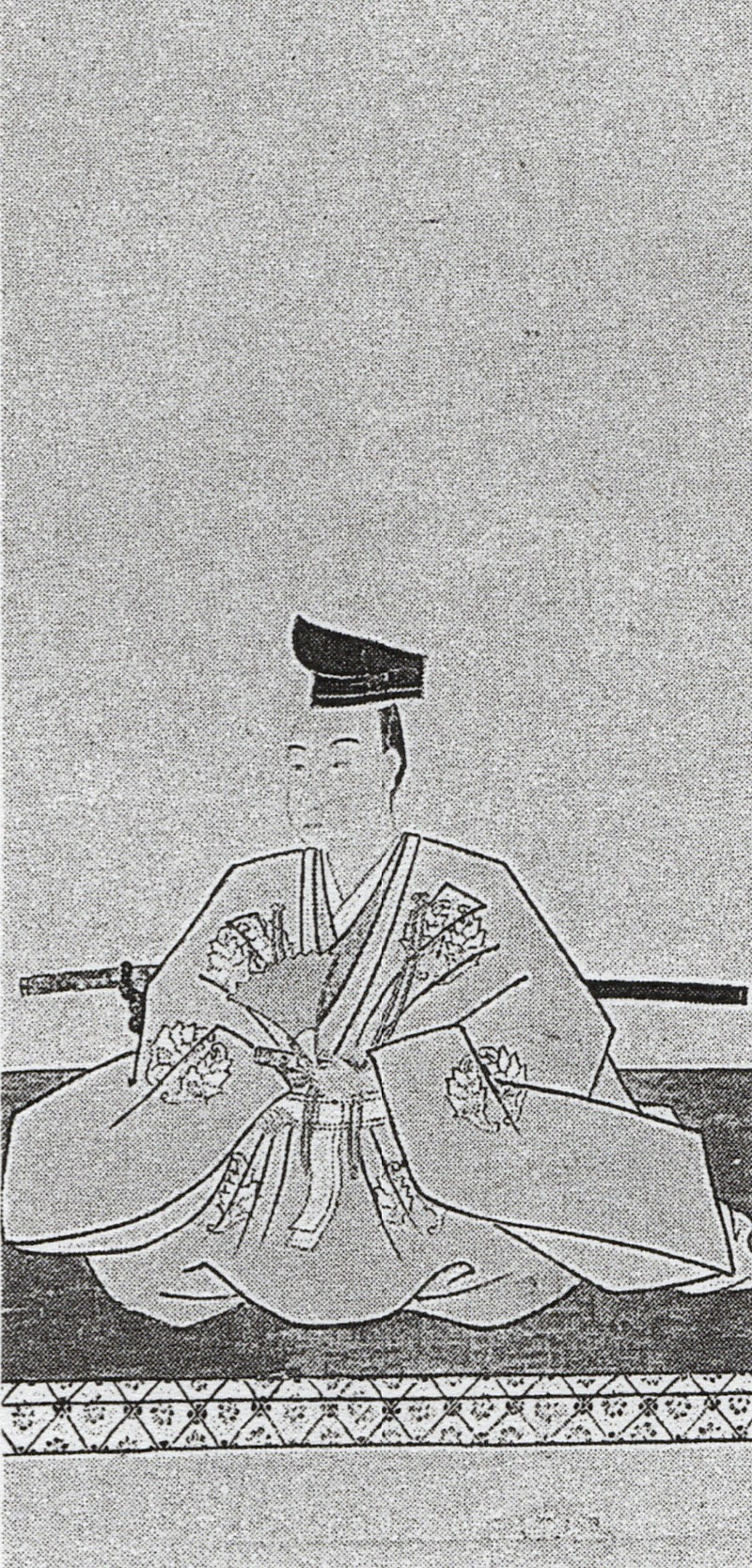
- Nabeshima Naooki

Daimyō of Hasunoike
- In office 1750–1757
- Preceded by: Nabeshima Naotsune
- Succeeded by: Nabeshima Naohiro

Nabeshima Naooki (鍋島 直興; August 1, 1730 – July 15, 1757) was a Japanese daimyō (feudal lord) of the mid-Edo period, who ruled the Hasunoike Domain in Hizen Province (modern-day Saga Prefecture). He was also known as Un'an Dōnin (雲菴道人).

Naooki received the title of Kai no Kami in 1750.

Preceded by Nabeshima Naotsune	Daimyō of Hasunoike; 1750–1757	Succeeded by Nabeshima Naohiro
