= Naozumi =

- Gender: Male

Origin
- Origin: Japanese
- Meaning: Different meanings depending on the kanji used

Naozumi (written: 直純 or 直澄) is a masculine Japanese given name. Notable people with the name include:

- Arima Naozumi (有馬 直純; 1586–1641), Japanese noble
- Nabeshima Naozumi (鍋島 直澄; 1616–1669), Japanese daimyō
- Naozumi Takahashi (高橋 直純; born 1971), Japanese singer and voice actor
