= Nabeshima Naonori =

Japanese daimyō

Daimyō of Hasunoike
- In office 1708–1717
- Preceded by: Nabeshima Naoyuki
- Succeeded by: Nabeshima Naotsune

Nabeshima Naonori (鍋島 直称; June 24, 1667 – July 6, 1736) was a Japanese daimyō of the mid-Edo period, who ruled the Hasunoike Domain in Hizen Province (modern-day Saga Prefecture).

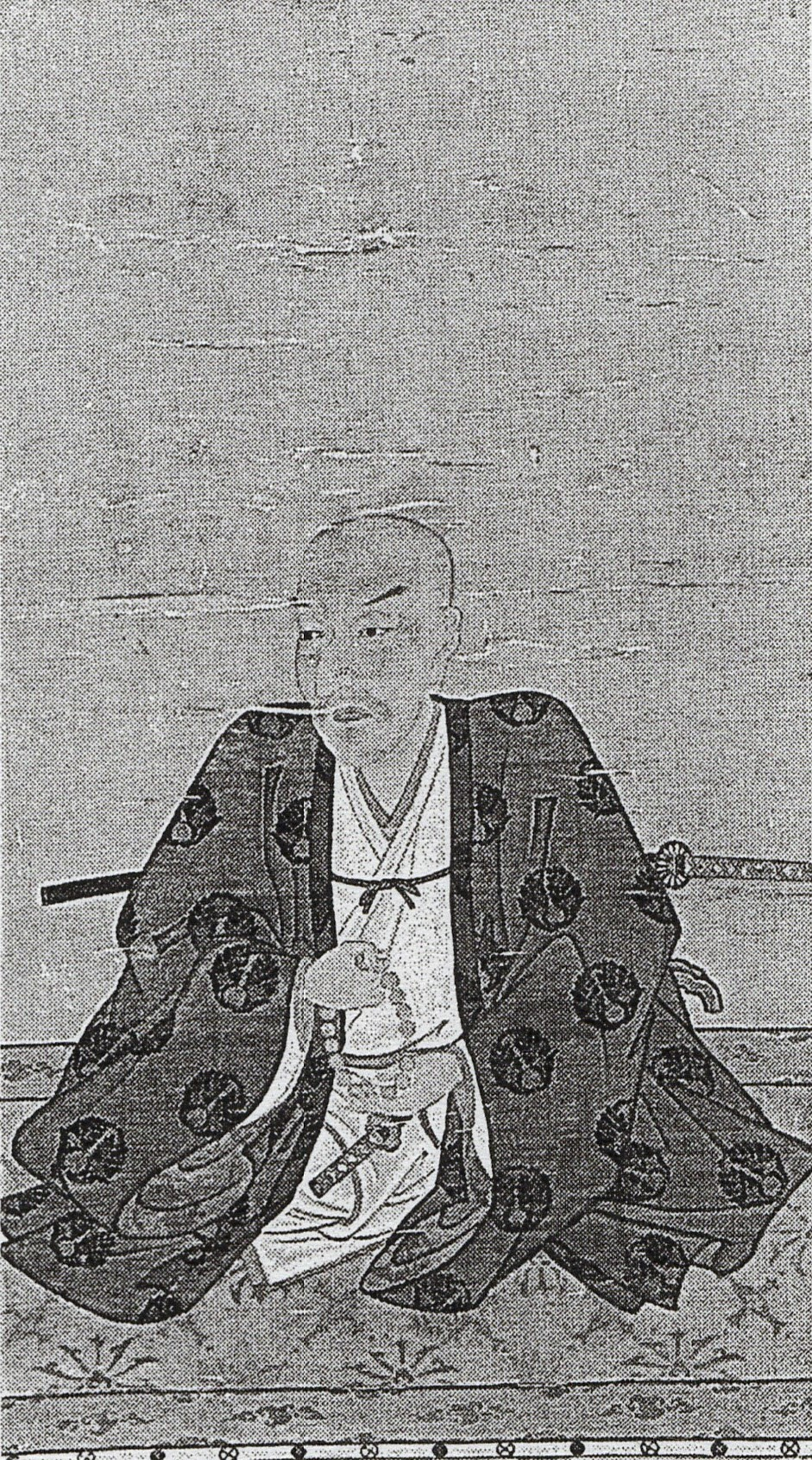

Preceded by Nabeshima Naoyuki	Daimyō of Hasunoike; 1708–1717	Succeeded by Nabeshima Naotsune
