= Naohiro =

- Gender: Male

Origin
- Origin: Japanese
- Meaning: Different meanings depending on the kanji used

Naohiro (written: 直敬, 直宏, 直泰, 直弘, 直大, 直寛, 直裕, 尚大 or 尚弘) is a masculine Japanese given name. Notable people with the name include:

- Naohiro Amaya (天谷 直弘; 1925–1994), Japanese politician
- Naohiro Dōgakinai (堂垣内 尚弘; 1914–2004), Japanese politician
- Naohiro Hoshikawa (星川 直宏; born 1974), Japanese professional wrestler
- Naohiro Ikeda (池田 尚弘; born 1940), Japanese volleyball player
- Naohiro Ishida (石田 直裕; born 1988), Japanese shogi player
- Naohiro Ishikawa (石川 直宏; born 1981), Japanese footballer
- Naohiro Kitade (北出 尚大; born 1973), Japanese footballer
- Naohiro Kotaki (小瀧 尚弘; born 1992), Japanese rugby union player
- Nabeshima Naohiro (Hasunoike) (鍋島 直寛; 1746–1775), Japanese daimyō
- Nabeshima Naohiro (Saga) (鍋島 直大; 1846–1921), Japanese daimyō
- Nagai Naohiro (永井 直敬; 1664–1711), Japanese daimyō
- Naohiro Oyama (大山 直大; born 1974), Japanese footballer
- Naohiro Takahara (高原 直泰; born 1979), Japanese footballer
- Naohiro Tamura (田村 直弘; born 1978), Japanese footballer
