= Nabeshima Naotsune =

Japanese daimyō

Daimyō of Hasunoike
- In office 1717–1749
- Preceded by: Nabeshima Naonori
- Succeeded by: Nabeshima Naooki

Nabeshima Naotsune (鍋島 直恒; January 2, 1702 – November 25, 1749) was a Japanese daimyō of the mid-Edo period, who ruled the Hasunoike Domain in Hizen Province (modern-day Saga Prefecture).

Preceded by Nabeshima Naonori	Daimyō of Hasunoike; 1717–1749	Succeeded by Nabeshima Naooki
