= Kujō Sukeie =

Kujō Sukeie (九条 輔家; October 11, 1769 – July 24, 1785), son of regent Michisaki with Tokugawa Kyohime, was a kugyō or Japanese court noble of the Edo period (1603–1868). He adopted a son of Nijō Harutaka, Suketsugu.
