= Naoharu =

- Gender: Male

Origin
- Origin: Japanese
- Meaning: Different meanings depending on the kanji used

Naoharu (written: 直温, 直治 or 尚敏) is a masculine Japanese given name. Notable people with the name include:

- Kataoka Naoharu (片岡 直温; 1859–1934), Japanese politician
- Mizoguchi Naoharu (溝口 直治; 1708–1732), Japanese daimyō
- Nabeshima Naoharu (鍋島 直温; 1766–1825), Japanese daimyō
- Ōsako Naoharu (大迫 尚敏; 1844–1927), Imperial Japanese Army general
