= Nabeshima Naohiro (Hasunoike) =

Japanese daimyō

Daimyō of Hasunoike
- In office 1758–1773
- Preceded by: Nabeshima Naooki
- Succeeded by: Nabeshima Naoharu

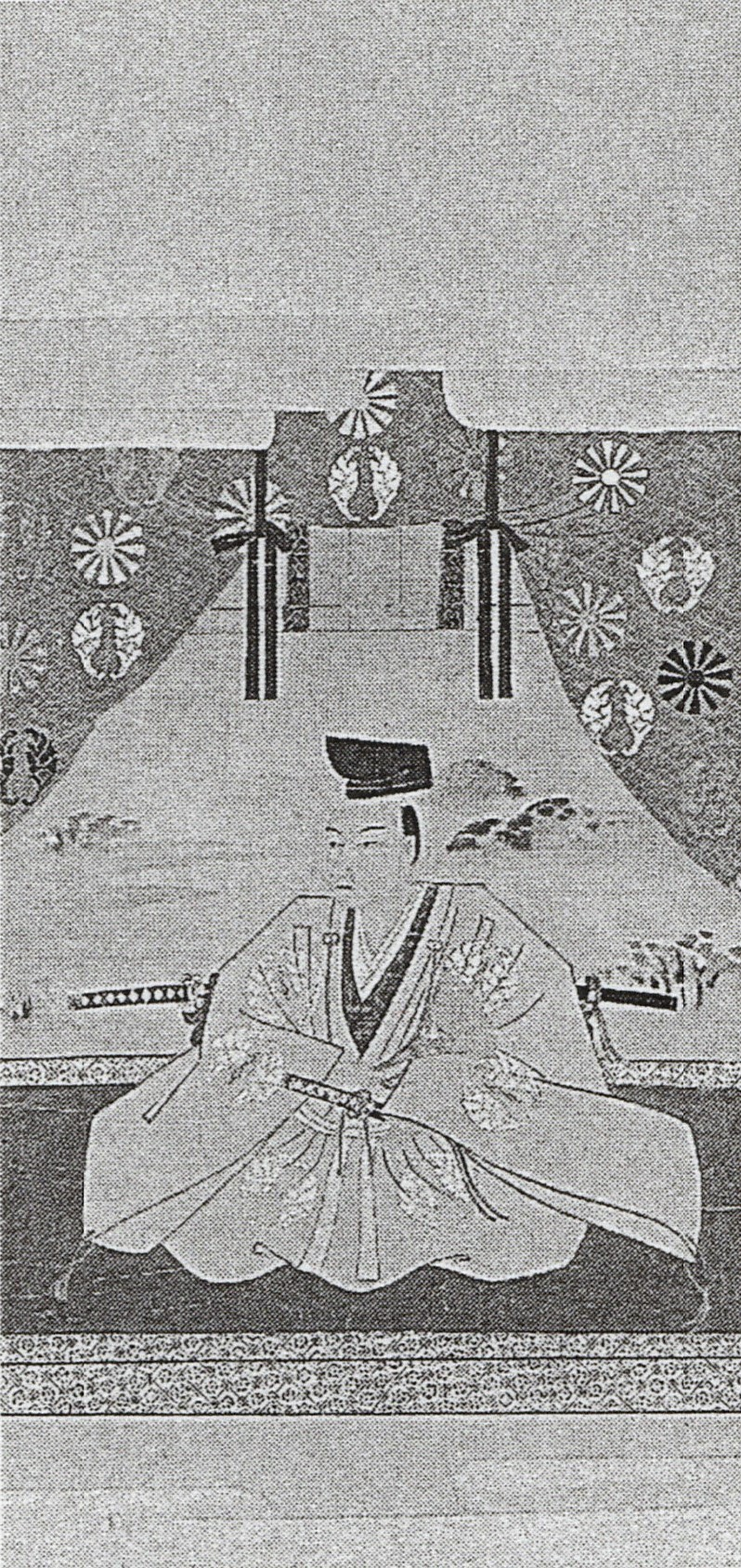

Nabeshima Naohiro (鍋島 直寛; May 8, 1746 – September 12, 1775) was a Japanese daimyō of the mid-Edo period, who ruled the Hasunoike Domain in Hizen Province (modern-day Saga Prefecture).

| Preceded by Nabeshima Naooki | Daimyō of Hasunoike; 1758–1773 | Succeeded by Nabeshima Naoharu |
