= List of cultural properties of Japan – paintings (Saga) =

This list is of the cultural properties of Japan designated in the category of paintings (絵画, kaiga) for the Prefecture of Saga.

== National Cultural Properties ==
As of 1 August 2019, two Important Cultural Properties have been designated, being of national significance.

Property	Date	Municipality	Ownership	Comments	Image	Dimensions	Coordinates	Ref.
Yōryū Kannon, colour on silk 絹本著色楊柳観音像 kenpon chakushoku Yōryū Kannon zō	1310	Saga	Kagami Jinja (鏡神社) (kept at Saga Prefectural Museum)	Goryeo Buddhist painting		419.5 centimetres (13 ft 9.2 in) by 254.2 centimetres (8 ft 4.1 in)	33°14′40″N 130°18′00″E	
Kenshin Raifuku, colour on silk Ikōtoku Kenzō, ink and light colour on silk 絹本著色見心来復像 絹本墨画淡彩以亨得謙像 kenpon chakushoku Kenshin Raifuku zō kenpon bokuga tansai Ikōtoku Kenzō zō	Yuan dynasty	Saga	Manzai-ji (萬歳寺) (kept at Saga Prefectural Museum)			94.5 centimetres (37.2 in) by 44.7 centimetres (17.6 in)	33°14′40″N 130°18′00″E	

== Prefectural Cultural Properties ==
As of 1 August 2019, twenty-one properties have been designated at a prefectural level.

Property	Date	Municipality	Ownership	Comments	Image	Dimensions	Coordinates	Ref.
Eight-Letter Monju Bosatsu Riding a Lion, colour on silk 絹本著色八字文殊菩薩騎獅図 kenpon chakushoku hachi-ji Monju Bosatsu kishi zu	Nanboku-chō period	Saga	Tanjō-in (誕生院) (kept at Saga Prefectural Museum)			91.8 centimetres (36.1 in) by 36.5 centimetres (14.4 in)	33°14′40″N 130°18′00″E	
Fugen Enmei Bosatsu Riding an Elephant, colour on silk 絹本著色普賢延命菩薩騎象像 kenpon chakushoku Fugen Enmei Monju Bosatsu kizō zō	Nanboku-chō period	Saga	Jissō-in (実相院)			123.0 centimetres (48.4 in) by 79.0 centimetres (31.1 in)	33°19′39″N 130°16′02″E	
Old Figure of Fukuman-ji, colour on paper 紙本著色福満寺古図 shihon chakushoku Fukuman-ji ko-zu	end of the Muromachi/Momoyama period	Saga	Fukuman-ji (福満寺)			130 centimetres (51 in) by 47.6 centimetres (18.7 in)	33°14′35″N 130°19′33″E	
Mandala of the Two Realms 両界曼荼羅図 ryōkai mandara zu		Saga	Saga Prefectural Museum			106.4 centimetres (41.9 in) by 82.7 centimetres (32.6 in)	33°14′40″N 130°18′00″E	
Amida with Eight Great Bodhisattvas, colour on silk 絹本著色阿弥陀八大菩薩像 kenpon chakushoku Amida hachidai bosatsu zō	late Goryeo	Saga	Kōfuku-ji (広福寺) (kept at Saga Prefectural Museum)	Goryeo Buddhist painting		153.5 centimetres (60.4 in) by 86.5 centimetres (34.1 in)	33°14′40″N 130°18′00″E	
Zenzai Dōji, ink and light colour on silk 絹本墨画淡彩善財童子歴参図 kenpon bokuga tansai Zenzai Dōji rekisan zu	Joseon (C16)	Saga	Kōfuku-ji (広福寺) (kept at Saga Prefectural Museum)			105.8 centimetres (41.7 in) by 59.0 centimetres (23.2 in)	33°14′40″N 130°18′00″E	
Yōryū Kannon, ink and light colour on silk 絹本墨画淡彩楊柳観音像 kenpon boguka tansai Yōryū Kannon zō	Joseon (C16)	Saga	Kōfuku-ji (広福寺) (kept at Saga Prefectural Museum)			114.3 centimetres (45.0 in) by 63.7 centimetres (25.1 in)	33°14′40″N 130°18′00″E	
Shaka Triad with Monks, colour on silk 絹本著色釈迦三尊及び比丘像 kenpon chakushoku Shaka sanzon oyobi biku zō	Joseon (C16)	Saga	Kōfuku-ji (広福寺) (kept at Saga Prefectural Museum)			168.8 centimetres (66.5 in) by 57.3 centimetres (22.6 in)	33°14′40″N 130°18′00″E	
Kanshitsu Genkitsu, colour on silk 絹本著色閑室元佶像 kenpon chakushoku Kanshitsu Genkitsu zō	1612	Ogi	Sangaku-ji (三岳寺)			146 centimetres (57 in) by 55.2 centimetres (21.7 in)	33°15′57″N 130°11′19″E	
Chiriku Hachimangū Engi-e 千栗八幡宮縁起絵; Chiriku Hachimangū engi-e	1589-1595	Miyaki	Chiriku Hachimangū (千栗八幡宮)	pair of scrolls; dated by the configuration of the buildings			33°19′53″N 130°28′43″E	
Ryūzōji Takanobu, colour on paper 紙本著色竜造寺隆信像 shihon chakushoku Ryūzōji Takanobu zu	late Momoyama/early Edo period	Saga	Sōryū-ji (宗龍寺) (kept at Saga Prefectural Museum)			75.6 centimetres (29.8 in) by 48.4 centimetres (19.1 in)	33°14′40″N 130°18′00″E	
Shaka – Kashō – Anan, by Kanō Tanyū 釈迦・迦葉・阿難図 狩野探幽筆; Shaka・Kashō・Anan Kanō Tanyū hitsu	1602-1674	Saga	Kōden-ji (高伝寺)				33°14′16″N 130°16′59″E	
Young Girl with a Mandolin, by Hyakutake Kaneyuki マンドリンを持つ少女 百武兼行筆 mandorin o motsu shōjo Hyakutake Kaneyuki hitsu	1879	Saga	Nabeshima Hōkōkai Foundation (財団法人鍋島報效会) (kept at the Chōkokan)	oil on canvas		114.0 centimetres (44.9 in) by 82.0 centimetres (32.3 in)	33°15′05″N 130°18′05″E	
Landscape fusuma, by Tani Bunchō 山水図襖 谷文晁筆 sansui zu fusuma Tani Bunchō hitsu	1820	Saga	Saga Prefectural Museum	twelve panels		174.3 centimetres (5 ft 8.6 in) by 1,063.4 centimetres (34 ft 10.7 in)	33°14′40″N 130°18′00″E	
Examining an Arrow, by Okada Saburōsuke 矢調べ 岡田三郎助筆 ya shirabe Okada Saburōsuke hitsu	1893	Saga	Saga Prefectural Museum			72.5 centimetres (28.5 in) by 105.0 centimetres (41.3 in)	33°14′40″N 130°18′00″E	
Kenryū-ji Engi-e 見瀧寺縁起絵; Kenryūji engi-e	early Edo period	Ogi	Hōchi-in (宝地院)			217.1 centimetres (85.5 in) by 155.8 centimetres (61.3 in)	33°19′24″N 130°12′49″E	
Chief Priest, by Kanō Takanobu 高僧像 狩野孝信筆 kōzō zō Kanō Takanobu hitsu	1571-1618	Saga	Saga Prefectural Museum			125.5 centimetres (49.4 in) by 58.3 centimetres (23.0 in)	33°14′40″N 130°18′00″E	
Nabeshima Mototake 鍋島元武像（金粟元明像） Nabeshima Mototake zō (Konzoku Genmyō zō)	Edo period	Saga	Gyokukō-ji (玉毫寺) (kept at Saga Prefectural Museum)	seven scrolls			33°14′40″N 130°18′00″E	
Nude, by Okada Saburōsuke 裸婦 岡田三郎助筆 rafu Okada Saburōsuke hitsu	1935	Saga	Saga Prefectural Museum			99.8 centimetres (39.3 in) by 65.5 centimetres (25.8 in)	33°14′40″N 130°18′00″E	
Field of Flowers, by Okada Saburōsuke 花野 岡田三郎助筆 hanano Okada Saburōsuke hitsu	1917	Saga	Saga Prefectural Museum				33°14′40″N 130°18′00″E	
Rising Sun, by Aoki Shigeru 朝日 青木繁筆 asahi Aoki Shigeru hitsu	1910	Saga	Saga Prefectural Museum				33°14′40″N 130°18′00″E	

== See also ==
- Cultural Properties of Japan
- List of National Treasures of Japan (paintings)
- Japanese painting
- List of Historic Sites of Japan (Saga)
