= Chōkokan =

- 徴古館
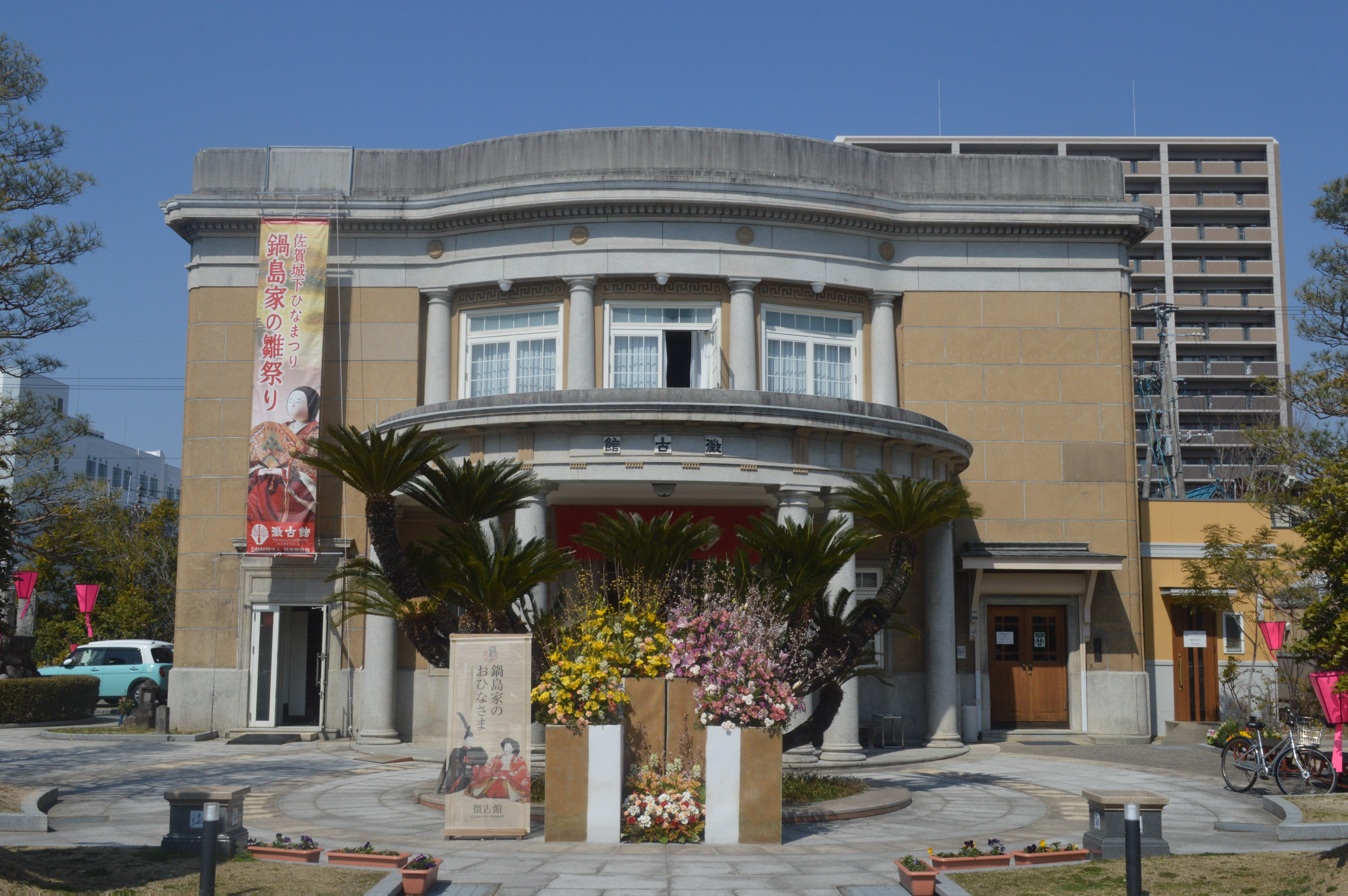
- Interactive map of the Chōkokan area

General information
- Location: 5-22, Matsubara 2-Chōme, Saga, Saga Prefecture, Japan
- Coordinates: 33°15′06″N 130°18′05″E
- Opened: 1927
- Renovated: 1998

Website
- Official website

The Chōkokan (徴古館, Chōkokan) opened in Saga, Saga Prefecture, Japan, in 1927. Founded by Nabeshima Naomitsu (鍋島直映), son of Nabeshima Naohiro of the Nabeshima clan, the last daimyō of Saga Domain in Hizen Province, the collection comprises historical materials and artworks relating to the Saga Domain and the Nabeshima family. The museum closed in 1945 but was reopened by the Nabeshima Hōkokai Foundation (鍋島報效会) in 1998. The museum building itself is a Registered Tangible Cultural Property dating from 1927. The collection includes the oldest extant Saibara score, a National Treasure.

== See also ==
- List of National Treasures of Japan (writings: Japanese books)
- List of Cultural Properties of Japan - paintings (Saga)
- Saga Prefectural Museum
