= Nabeshima Naozumi =

Japanese daimyō

Daimyō of Hasunoike
- In office 1639–1665
- Preceded by: none
- Succeeded by: Nabeshima Naoyuki

Nabeshima Naozumi (鍋島 直澄; January 1, 1616 – April 5, 1669) was a Japanese daimyō of the early Edo period, who ruled the Hasunoike Domain in Hizen Province (modern-day Saga Prefecture). He was the son of Nabeshima Katsushige, and was a viable candidate for succession to the lordship of the Saga Domain upon the death of his brother Tadanao (Naozumi married Tadanao's widow); however, this plan was unsuccessful. Naozumi was instead granted 52,000 koku in Hizen Province, and became the first daimyō of Hasunoike.

Preceded by none	Daimyō of Hasunoike; 1639–1665	Succeeded by Nabeshima Naoyuki
