= Nabeshima Naotomo =

Japanese daimyō

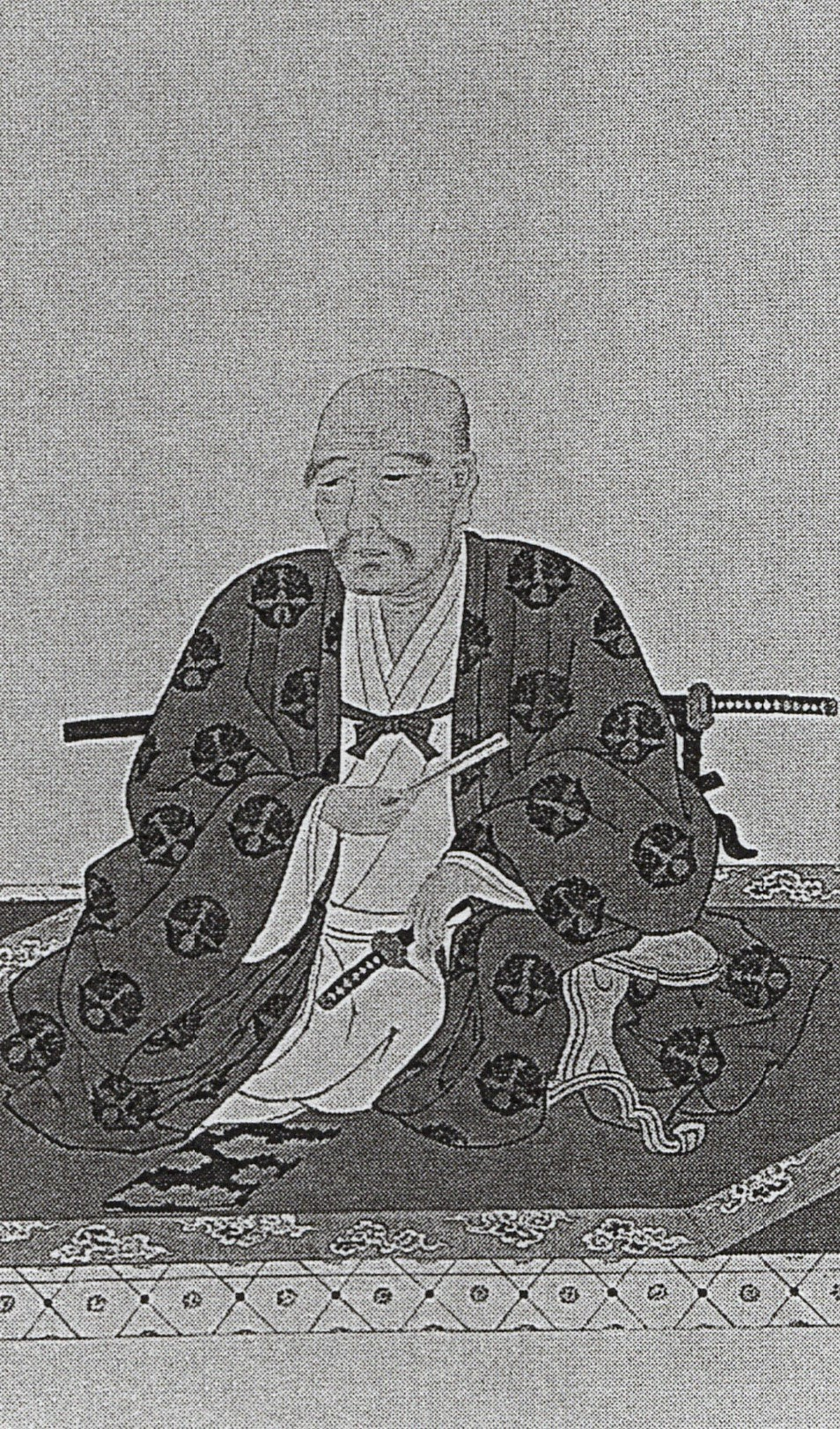

Daimyō of Hasunoike
- In office 1816–1845
- Preceded by: Nabeshima Naoharu
- Succeeded by: Nabeshima Naotada

Personal details
- Spouse: Nijō Suiko

Nabeshima Naotomo (鍋島 直与; June 16, 1798 – December 7, 1864) was a Japanese daimyō of the late Edo period, who ruled the Hasunoike Domain in Hizen Province (modern-day Saga Prefecture).

Preceded by Nabeshima Naoharu	Daimyō of Hasunoike; 1816–1845	Succeeded by Nabeshima Naotada
