= Nabeshima Naoharu =

Japanese daimyō

Daimyō of Hasunoike
- In office 1775–1816
- Preceded by: Nabeshima Naohiro
- Succeeded by: Nabeshima Naotomo

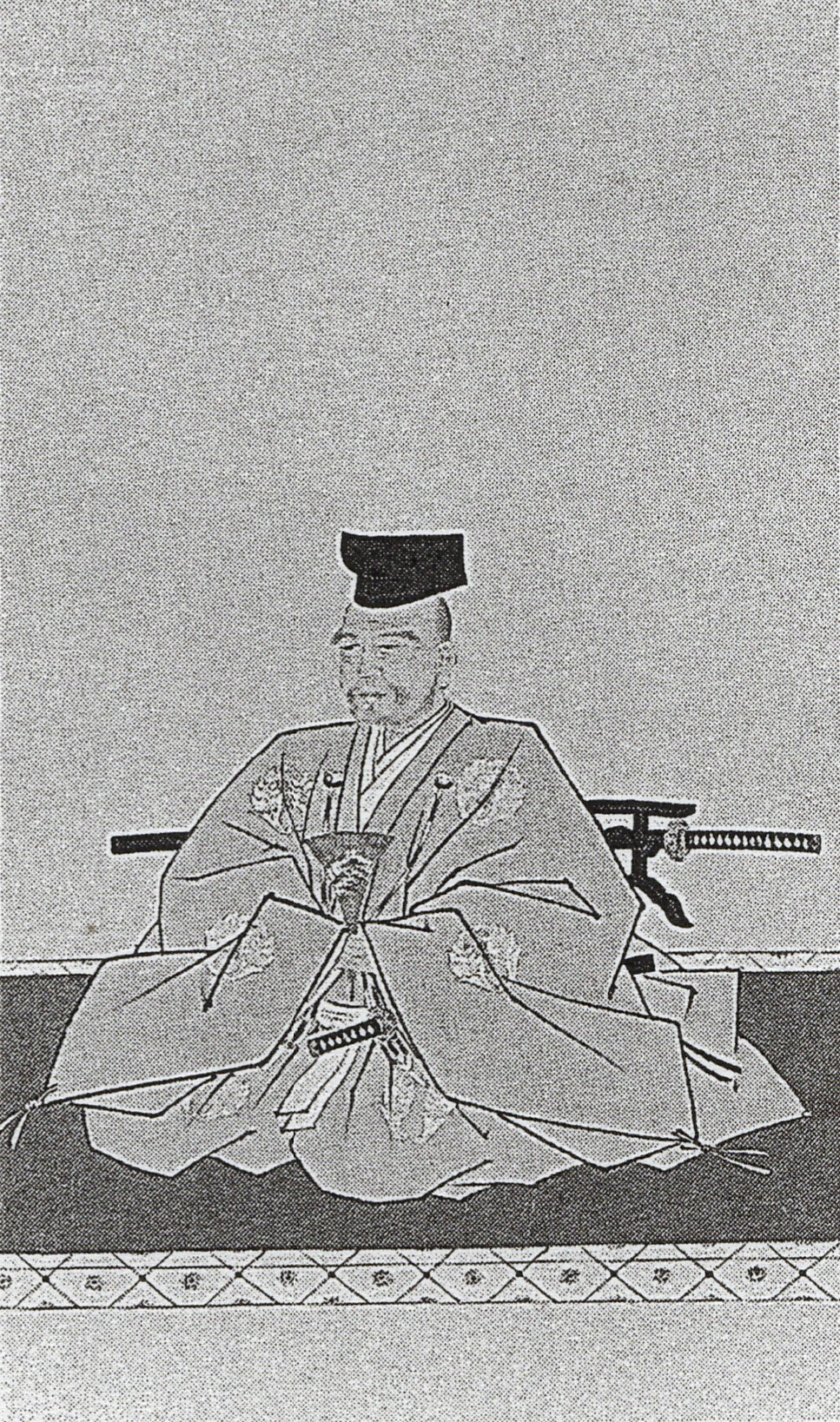

Nabeshima Naoharu (鍋島 直温; June 13, 1766 – December 10, 1825) was a Japanese daimyō of the late Edo period, who ruled the Hasunoike Domain in Hizen Province (modern-day Saga Prefecture).

Preceded by Nabeshima Naohiro	Daimyō of Hasunoike; 1774–1816	Succeeded by Nabeshima Naotomo
