= Nijō Tsunahira =

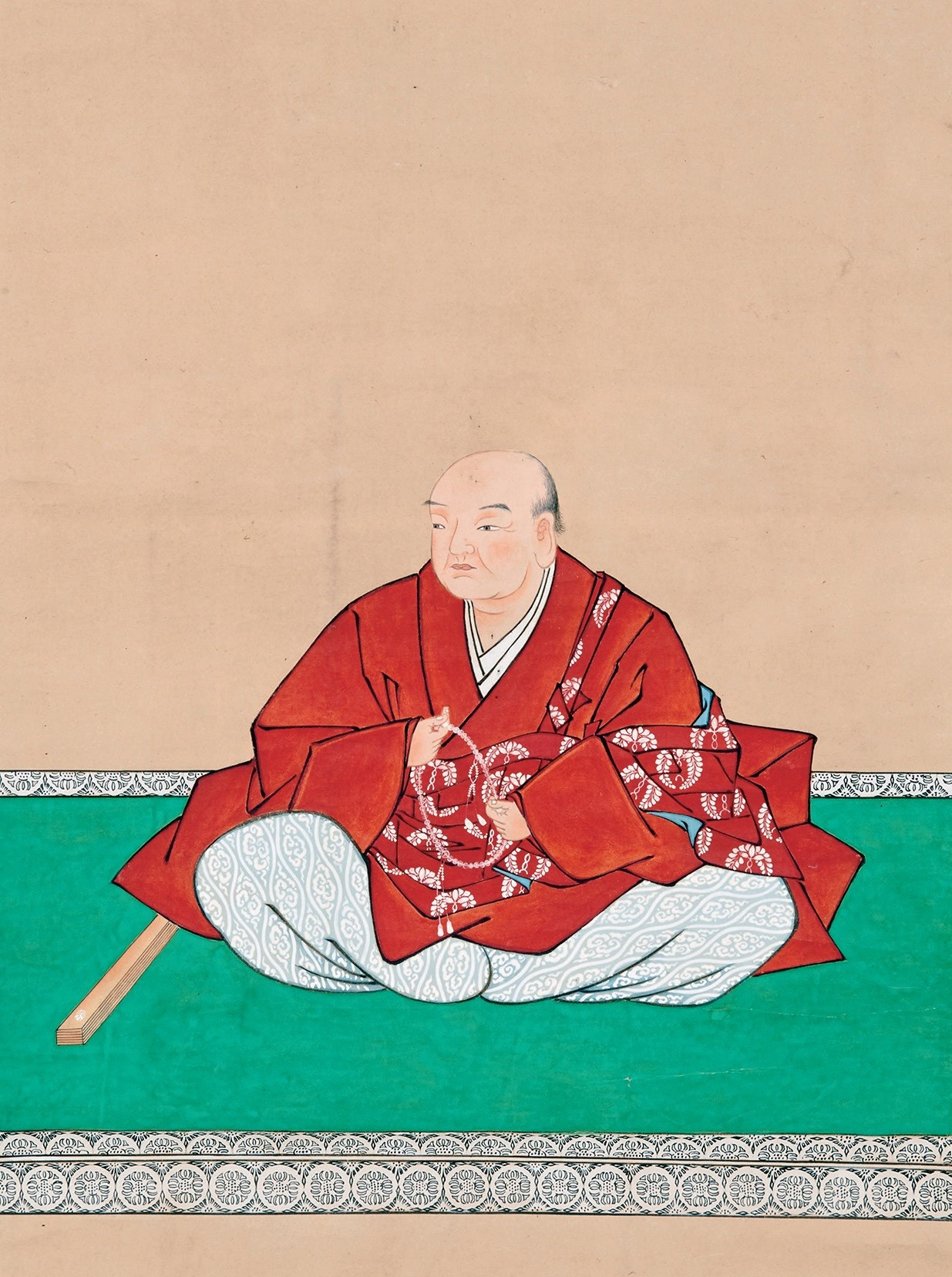

Nijō Tsunahira (二条 綱平; 1672–1732), son of Kujō Kaneharu and adopted son of Nijō Mitsuhira, was a Japanese kugyō (court noble) of the Edo period. He held a regent position kampaku from 1722 to 1726. A daughter of Emperor Reigen was his wife who gave birth to Nijō Yoshitada.
