= Kujō Suketsugu =

Japanese court noble

- Native name: 九条 輔嗣
- Born: 28 October 1784
- Died: 6 March 1807 (aged 22)
- Father: Nijō Harutaka
- Mother: Tokugawa Yoshihime
- Occupation: Kuge

Kujō Suketsugu (九条 輔嗣; October 28, 1784 – March 6, 1807), son of Nijō Harutaka with Tokugawa Yoshihime (daughter of Tokugawa Munemoto) and adopted son of Kujō Sukeie, was a kuge or Japanese court noble of the Edo period (1603–1868). He, as his father did, adopted son of Nijō Harutaka, Hisatada.
