= Nijō Munehira =

Japanese kugyō

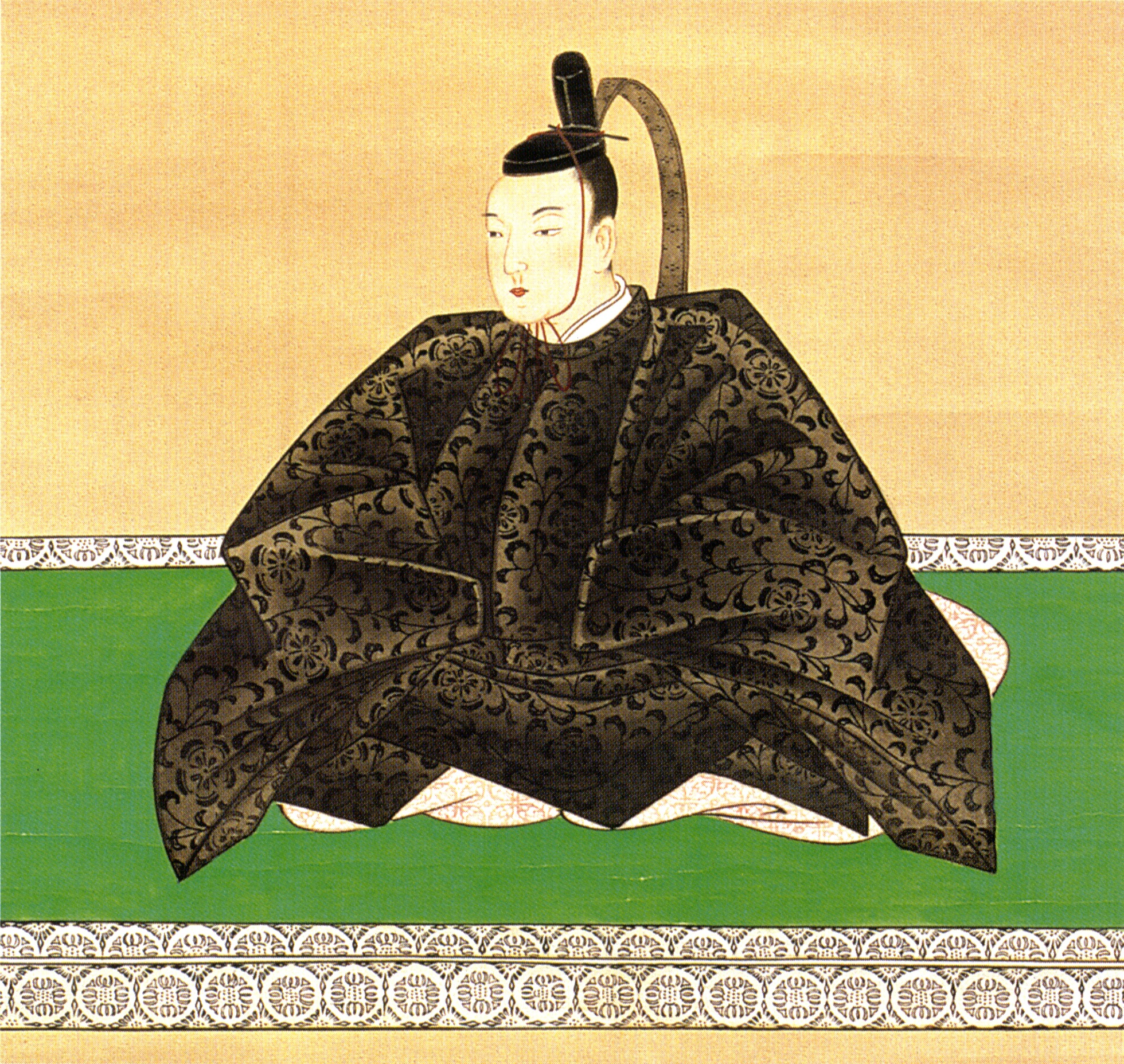

Nijō Munehira (二条 宗熙; December 27, 1718 – August 3, 1738), son of regent Nijō Yoshitada, was a Japanese kugyō (court noble) of the Edo period. He adopted Kujō Yukinori's son who became known as Nijō Munemoto.

== Family ==
Parents

- Father: Nijō Yoshitada (二条 吉忠, 26 September 1689– 28 August 1737)
- Mother: a Court lady (家女房)

Consorts and issues:

- Wife: Unknown name
- Adopted children: Nijō Munemoto (二条 宗基, June 8, 1727 – February 9, 1754), son of Kujō Yukinori
