= Saga Prefectural Nagoya Castle Museum =

- 佐賀県立名護屋城博物館
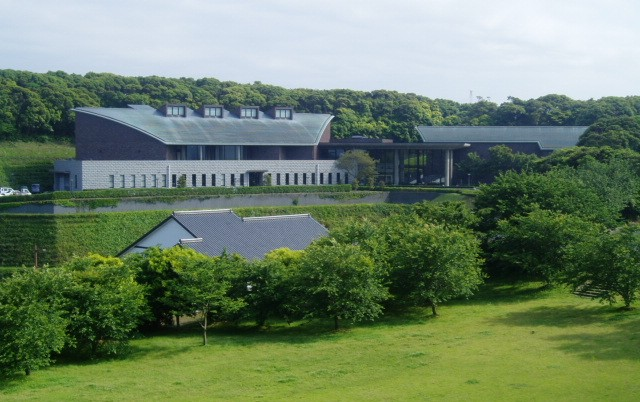
- Interactive map of Saga Prefectural Nagoya Castle Museum

General information
- Location: 1931-3, Nagoya, Chinzei-machi, Karatsu, Saga Prefecture, Japan
- Coordinates: 33°31′40″N 129°52′13″E
- Opened: 1993

Website
- homepage (jp)

Saga Prefectural Nagoya Castle Museum (佐賀県立名護屋城博物館, Saga Kenritsu Nagoya-jō Hakubutsukan) opened in 1993 in Karatsu, Saga Prefecture, Japan, on the site of Nagoya Castle, built in 1591 as the base for Hideyoshi's invasions of Korea. It displays artefacts excavated from the castle site and other materials relating to three main themes: (1) the history of exchange between the Japanese archipelago and Korean peninsula; (2) the preservation of the Special Historic Site of Nagoya Castle; (3) cultural and academic exchange between Japan and Korea. The 2,000,000th visit was in August 2010.

In April 2022 a replica of the Golden Tea Room was installed.

== See also ==
- Saga Prefectural Museum
- List of Historic Sites of Japan (Saga)
- Japan-Korea relations
