= Hasunoike Domain =

Japanese domain of the Edo period

Hasunoike Domain 蓮池藩
- Domain of Japan
- 1642–1871
- Mon of the Nabeshima clan
- Capital: Hasunoike jin'ya
  - Type: Daimyō
- Historical era: Edo period
  - Established: 1642
  - Disestablished: 1871
- Today part of: Saga Prefecture
- Location of Hasunoike Jin'ya Hasunoike Domain (Japan)

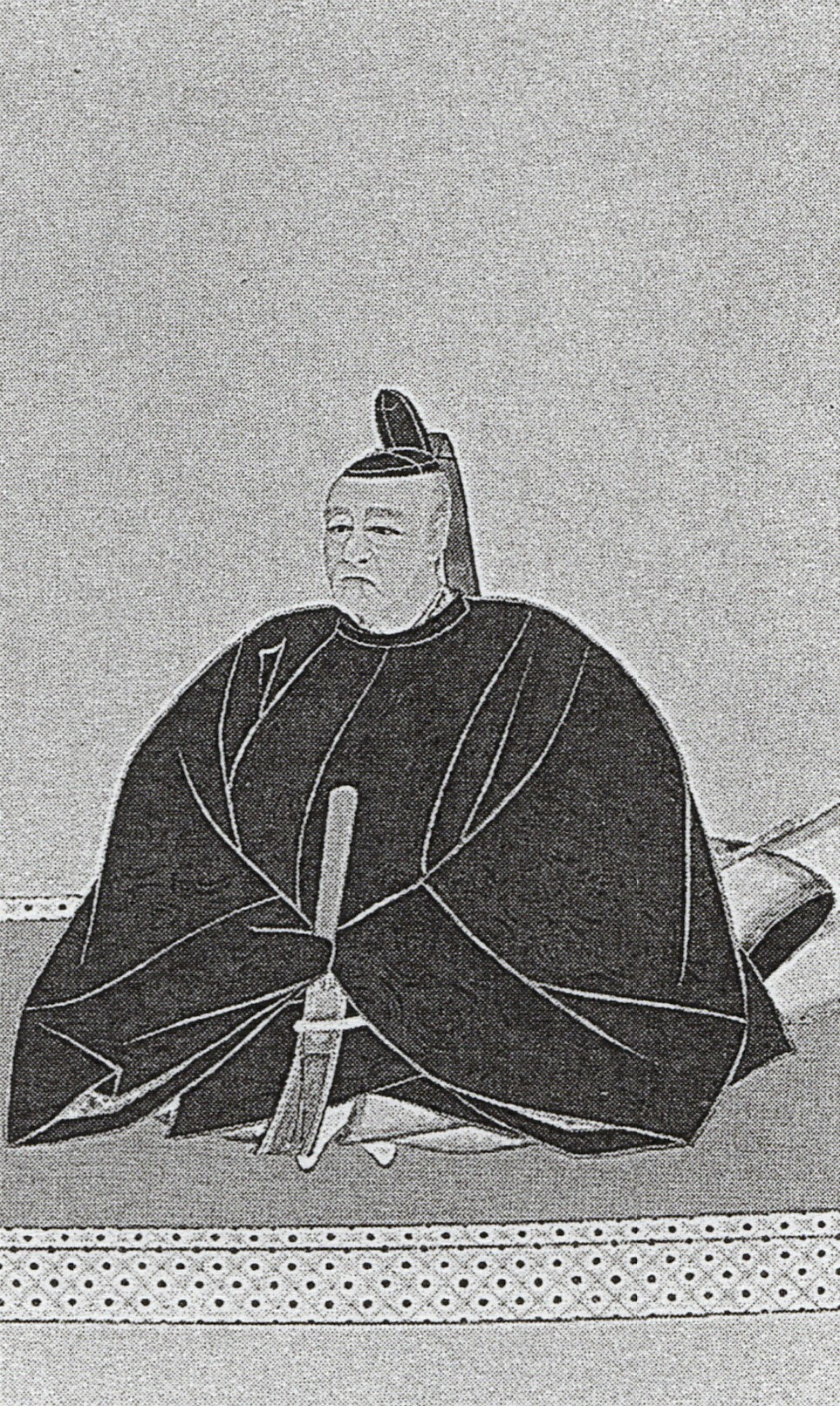
Nabeshima Naotada, final daimyo of Hasunoike Domain

Hasunoike Domain (蓮池藩, Hasunoike-han) was a Japanese domain of the Edo period. It was regarded as a sub-domain of Saga Domain. the headquarters of the domain were initially within the San-no-maru of Saga Castle; later a jin'ya was erected in the Hasunoike district of Saga city. It was ruled by a cadet branch of the tozama daimyō Nabeshima clan for all of its history.

== History ==
There are many theories about when Hasunoike Domain was established, as documentary evidence in unclear. Most accounts agree that it was created for Nabeshima Naozumi, the fifth son of the first daimyō of Saga Domain, Nabeshima Katsushige. Naozumi was assigned a kokudaka of 52,000 koku, which was taken directly from Saga Domain's revenues, with no specific estates granted. The headquarters of the domain were within the san-no-maru (third bailey) of Saga Castle. Later a jin'ya in the Hasunoike district of Saga city, approximately six kilometers east of Saga Castle was erected and the domain assigned estates scattered across the districts of Saga, Kanzaki, Kishima, Matsuura, and Fujitsu. This scattered nature of these holdings necessitated the creation of a secondary domain office in Shiota-juku, a post town on the Nagasaki Kaidō road, to administer its western estates.

Hasunoike initially was subject to sankin-kōtai and was treated as if an independent domain. However, in 1730, it petitioned the Tokugawa shogunate to be permitted to stop making the expensive trips to Edo, but this was rejected and it continued to attend as part of the retinue of Saga Domain.

During the unsettled Bakumatsu period, the 9th (and last) daimyō of Hasunoike, Nabeshima Naotada was ordered the Tokugawa shogunate to take responsibility of the defenses of the Nagasaki area against possible incursions by foreign ships, and was forced to raise and train troops, and build coastal defense fortifications in 1854. This greatly strained the already precarious finances of the domain, which could only be resolved by placing the domain into great debt. In 1864, Naotada dispatched troops to Kyoto to assist the Tokugawa forces in keeping public order. However, during the Boshin War of the Meiji Restoration, he switched sides to the Satchō Alliance and dispatched Hasunoike's forces under the command of his younger brother, against the Ōuetsu Reppan Dōmei and Tokugawa remnants at Akita in support of Emperor Meiji

With the abolition of the han system in 1871, Hasunoike Domain briefly became "Hasunoike Prefecture". It later became "Imari Prefecture", Saga Prefecture, "Mizuma Prefecture", and Nagasaki Prefecture, before it was merged into the new Saga Prefecture.

In 1884, Naotada and his heirs were granted the title of viscount (shishaku) under the kazoku peerage system. The site of the Hasunoike jin'ya is now the Hasuike Park is remnants of the gardens preserved and the site of the jin'ya marked by a stone monument and a Shinto shrine.

== Holdings at the end of the Edo period ==
As with most domains in the han system, Hasunoike Domain consisted of several discontinuous territories calculated to provide the assigned kokudaka, based on periodic cadastral surveys and projected agricultural yields.

- Hizen Province
  - 2 villages in Saga District
  - 10 villages in Kanzaki District
  - 8 villages in Kishima District
  - 13 villages in Fujitsu District
  - 1 village in Matsura District

== List of daimyō ==
| # | Name | Tenure | Courtesy title | Court Rank | kokudaka |
|---|---|---|---|---|---|
Nabeshima clan, 1642–1871 (Tozama daimyō)
| 1 | Nabeshima Naozumi (鍋島直澄) | 1642–1665 | Kai-no-kami (甲斐守) | Lower 5th, Junior grade (従五位下) | 52,000 koku |
| 2 | Nabeshima Naoyuki (鍋島直之) | 1665–1708 | Settsu-no-kami (摂津守) | Lower 5th, Junior grade (従五位下) | 52,000 koku |
| 3 | Nabeshima Naonori (鍋島直称) | 1708–1717 | Kai-no-kami (甲斐守) | Lower 5th, Junior grade (従五位下) | 52,000 koku |
| 4 | Nabeshima Naotsune (鍋島直恒) | 1717–1749 | Settsu-no-kami (摂津守) | Lower 5th, Junior grade (従五位下) | 52,000 koku |
| 5 | Nabeshima Naooki (鍋島直興) | 1750–1757 | Kai-no-kami (甲斐守) | Lower 5th, Junior grade (従五位下) | 52,000 koku |
| 6 | Nabeshima Naohiro (鍋島直寛) | 1757–1773 | Settsu-no-kami (摂津守) | Lower 5th, Junior grade (従五位下) | 52,000 koku |
| 7 | Nabeshima Naoharu (鍋島直温) | 1774–1816 | Kai-no-kami (甲斐守) | Lower 5th, Junior grade (従五位下) | 52,000 koku |
| 8 | Nabeshima Naotomo (鍋島直与) | 1816–1845 | Settsu-no-kami (摂津守) | Lower 5th, Junior grade (従五位下) | 52,000 koku |
| 9 | Nabeshima Naotada (鍋島直紀) | 1845–1871 | Kai-no-kami (甲斐守) | Lower 5th, Junior grade (従五位下) | 52,000 koku |

== See also ==
- List of Han
- Abolition of the han system
