= Nijō Harutaka =

Japanese kugyō (court noble)

- 二条 治孝
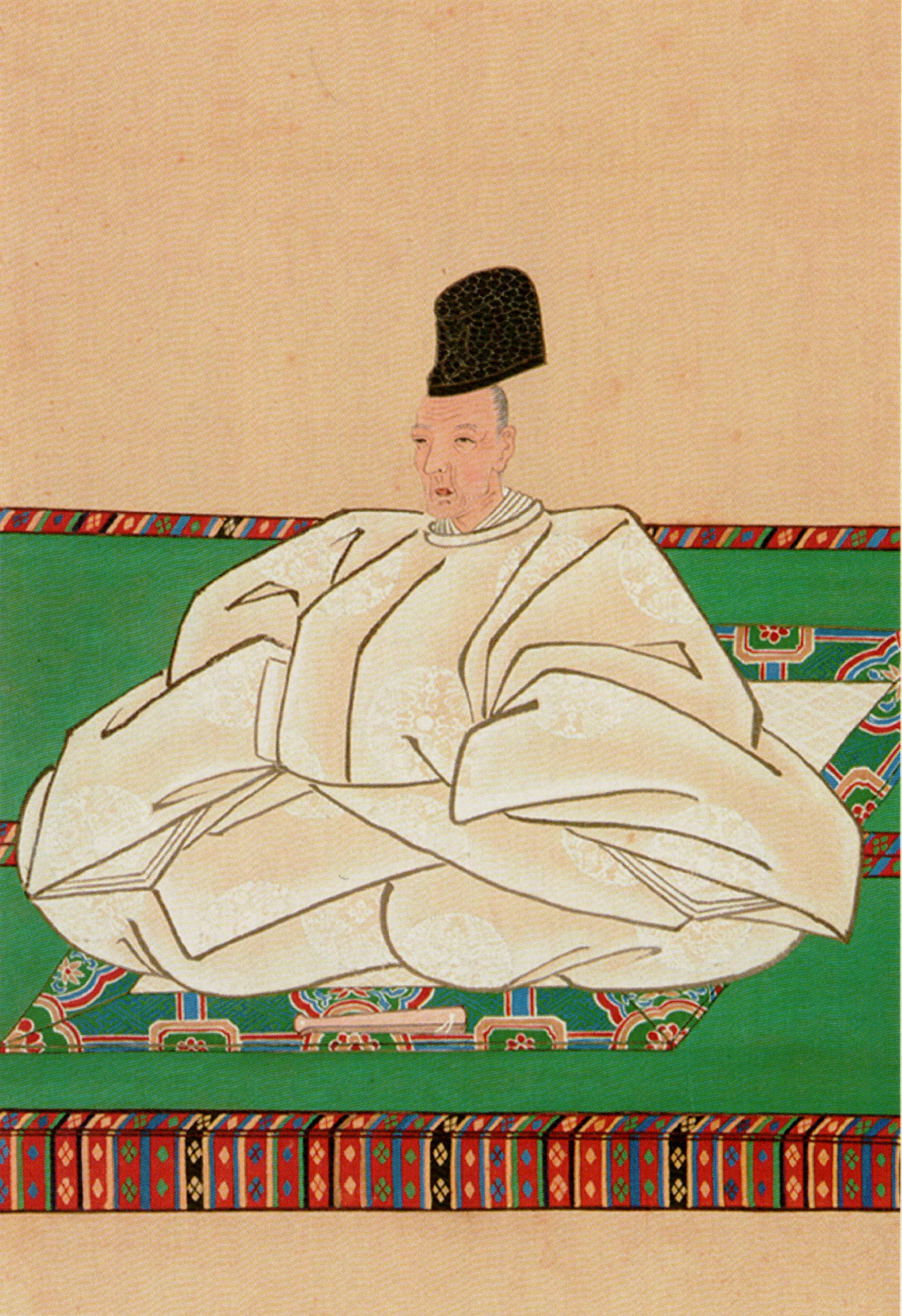

Minister of the Left
- In office 30 May 1796 – 21 May 1814

kugyō

Personal details
- Born: 30 October 1754
- Died: 5 November 1826 (aged 72)
- Spouse(s): Tokugawa Yoshihime; Higuchi Nobuko
- Children: Nijō Narimichi; Kujō Suketsugu; Nijō Narinobu; Kujō Hisatada and others
- Parent: Nijō Munemoto (father)

Nijō Harutaka (二条 治孝; October 30, 1754 – November 5, 1826), son of Nijō Munemoto, was a Japanese kugyō (court noble) of the Edo period (1603–1868).

He had many children with a daughter of the fifth lord of Mito Domain Tokugawa Munemoto. Among them were: (in order of birth)

- Nijō Narimichi (二条 斉通; 1781-1798)
- Kujō Suketsugu
- Saionji 寛季
- Consort of Tokugawa Nariatsu, third head of Hitotsubashi-Tokugawa family
- Nijō Narinobu (who was adopted by his brother Narimichi)
- Kujō Hisatada
- Nijo Suiko, Consort of Nabeshima Naotomo, eighth lord of Hasunoike Domain (subdomain of Saga Domain).
- Consort of Matsudaira Yoritsugu, eighth lord of Hitachi-Fuchū Domain.

== Family ==
Parents

- Father: Nijō Munemoto (二条 宗基, June 8, 1727 – February 9, 1754)
- Mother: Court Lady (家女房)

Consorts and issues:

- Wife: Tokugawa Yoshihime (徳川嘉姫), daughter of Tokugawa Munemoto
  - Nijō Narimichi (二条斉通, 31 Mai 1781 – 4 July 1794), first son
  - Kujō Suketsugu (九条 輔嗣, 28 October 1784 – 6 March 1807), third son
  - Nijō Narinobu (二条 斉信, April 10, 1788 – June 9, 1847), sixth son
- Concubine: Higuchi Nobuko (樋口信子), daughter of Higuchi Motoyasu (樋口基康)
  - Kujō Hisatada (九条 尚忠, September 5, 1798 – October 5, 1871), eleventh son
- Concubine: Court Lady (家女房)
  - Saionji Hirouse (西園寺寛季, 23 January 1787 – 18 March 1856), fourth son
  - Tanemaro (胤麿), fifth son
  - Zomamoru (増護, d. 1875), sixth son
  - Michinaga (道永, d.1821), seventh son
  - Shinkkan (信観), eighth son
  - Matsudono Takanori (松殿隆温, 1811 – 1875), ninth son
  - Lady Takako (隆子), Wife of Tokugawa Harukuni (徳川 治国), first daughter
  - Lady Tsunehime (恒姫), second daughter
  - Lady Oyako (親子), third daughter
  - Lady Yasuko (保子), Wife of Tokugawa Nariatsu (徳川 斉敦), fourth daughter
  - Lady Ueko (嬉子) fifth daughter
  - Lady Kyoko (軌子), Wife of Hanazono Kohei (花園公熙), sixth daughter
  - Lady Fukuko (福子), Wife of Kuroda Narikiyo (黒田 斉清), seventh daughter
  - Lady Takiko (多喜子), eighth daughter
  - Lady Takeko (武子), Eife of Otose Shigenobu (乙瀬重信), ninth daughter
  - Lady Hiroko (広子), tenth daughter
  - Lady Ikuko (育子), eleventh daughter
  - Lady Jūko (柔子), Wife of Echizen Seiteru (越前誠照), twelfth daughter
  - Lady Chikako (近子, 1804 – 1849), thirteenth daughter
  - Lady Junhine (純姫), fourteenth daughter
  - Nijo Suiko (二条 遂子), Wife of Nabeshima Naotomo (鍋島 直与), fifteenth daughter
  - Lady Saiko (最子), Wife of Matsudaira Yoritsuna ( 松平頼縄), sixteenth daughter
  - Lady Tsuneko (常子), seventeenth daughter

== Ancestry ==
Ancestors of Nijō Harutaka

16. Kujō Kaneharu (1641-1677)
8. Kujō Sukezane (1669-1729)
17. Kujō Toki-hime
4.Kujō Yukinori (1700-1728)
2. Nijō Munemoto (1727–1754)
20. Tokugawa Tsunanari, 3rd daimyō of Owari (1652-1699)
10. Tokugawa Yoshimichi, 4th daimyō of Owari (1689-1713)
21. Hōju-in (1665-1739)
5. Tokugawa Sen-hime
11. Osan no Kata
1.Nijō Harutaka
