= Nijō Munemoto =

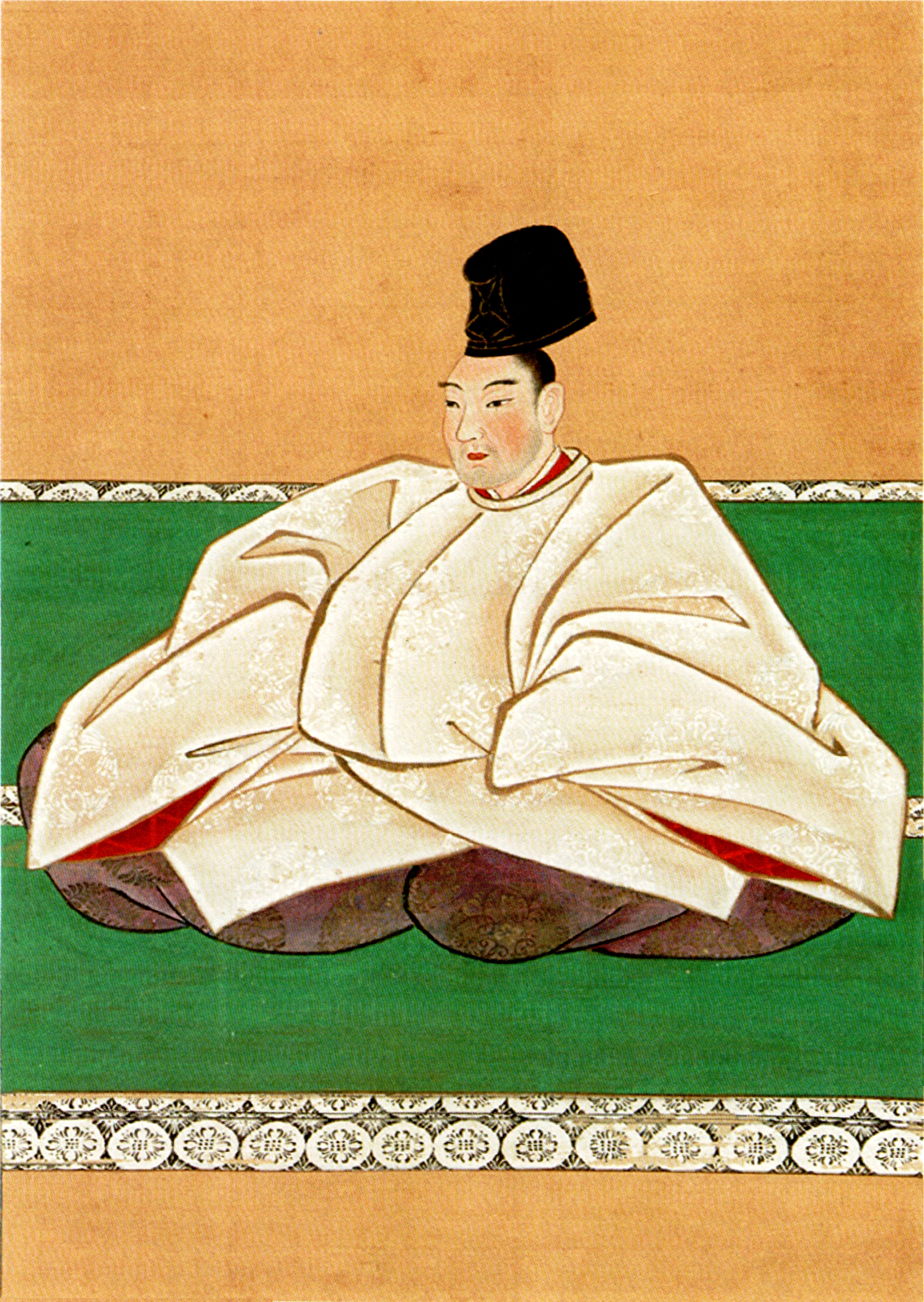

Nijō Munemoto (二条 宗基; June 8, 1727 – February 9, 1754), son of Kujō Yukinori and adopted son of Nijō Munehira, was a Japanese kugyō (court noble) of the Edo period (1603–1868). He had two sons, Nijō Shigeyori (二条 重良; 1751-1768) and Nijō Harutaka. As Shigeyori had died at a young age, Munemoto adopted Harutaka as his son.

== Ancestry ==
Ancestors of Nijō Munemoto

16. Takatsukasa Norihira (1609-1668)
8. Kujō Kaneharu (1641-1677)
17. Reizei
4. Kujō Sukezane (1669-1729)
18. Kujō Michifusa (1609-1647)
9. Kujō Tokihime
19. Matsudaira Tsuruhime (1618-1671)
2. Kujō Yukinori (1700-1728)
1.Nijō Munemoto
24. Tokugawa Mitsutomo, 2nd daimyō of Owari (1625-1700)
12. Tokugawa Tsunanari, 3rd daimyō of Owari (1652-1699)
25. Chiyohime (1637-1699)
6. Tokugawa Yoshimichi, 4th daimyō of Owari (1689-1713)
13. Hōju-in (1665-1739)
3. Tokugawa Senhime (1706-1757)
7. Osan no Kata
