= Saga Prefectural Museum =

- 佐賀県立博物館
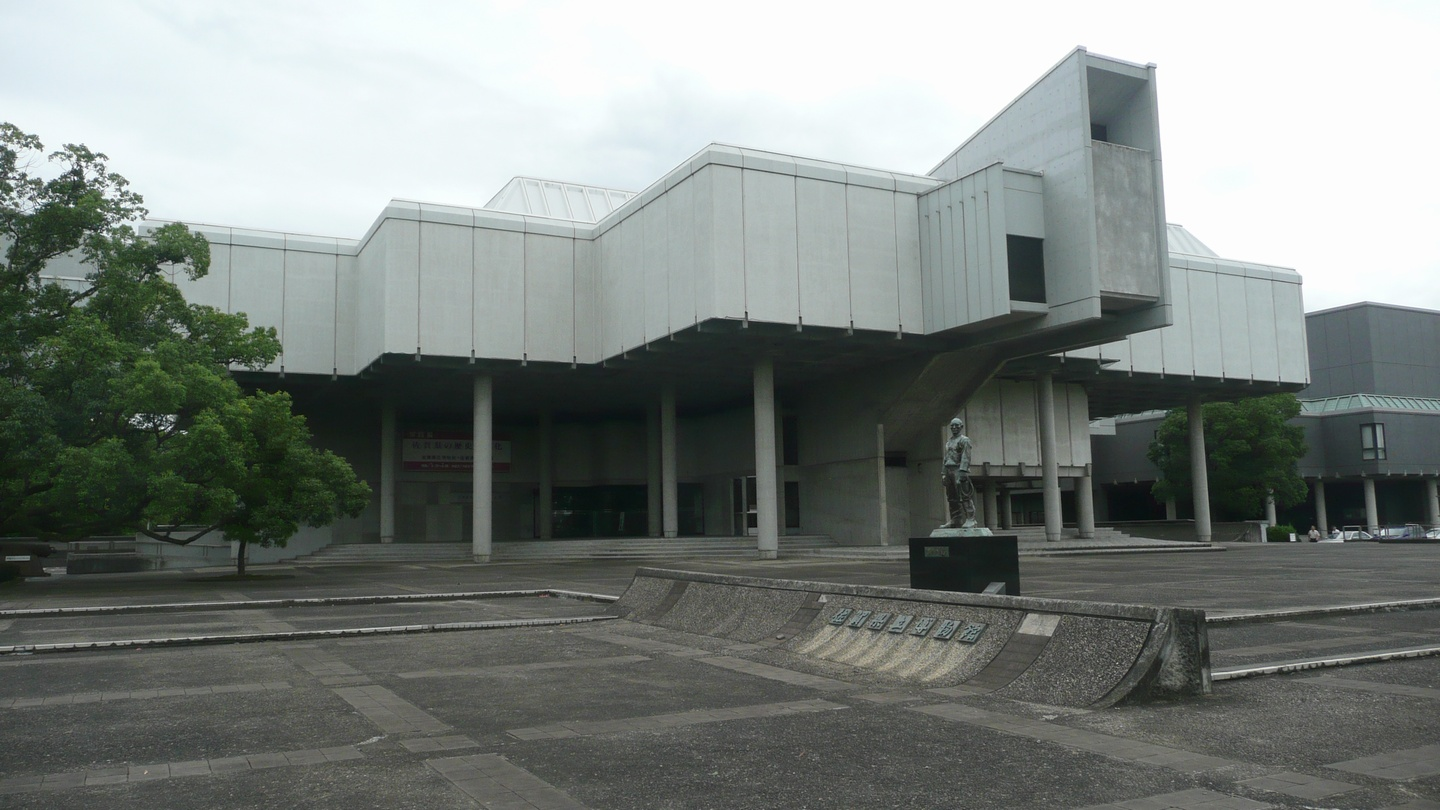
- Interactive map of the Saga Prefectural Museum area

General information
- Location: 1-15-23, Jōnai, Saga, Saga Prefecture, Japan
- Coordinates: 33°14′42″N 130°18′2″E
- Opened: 1970

Website
- homepage

Saga Prefectural Museum (佐賀県立博物館, Saga Kenritsu Hakubutsukan) opened in 1970 on the sannomaru site of Saga Castle in the city of Saga, Japan, in 1970. It is one of Japan's many museums which are supported by a prefecture.

The museum displays materials relating to the natural history, archaeology, history, art, craft, and folklore of Saga Prefecture. Adjacent is the Saga Prefectural Art Museum (佐賀県立美術館), which opened in 1983 as part of the centennial celebrations of the establishment of Saga Prefecture. A Tyrannosaurus rex model displayed at the museum, donated from the National Museum of Nature and Science in the 1970s, is said to have inspired the design of the original Godzilla.

== See also ==
- Hizen Province
- Saga Domain
- List of Historic Sites of Japan (Saga)
- Prefectural museum
