= Hizen Province =

Former province of Japan

Map of Japanese provinces (1868) with Hizen Province highlighted

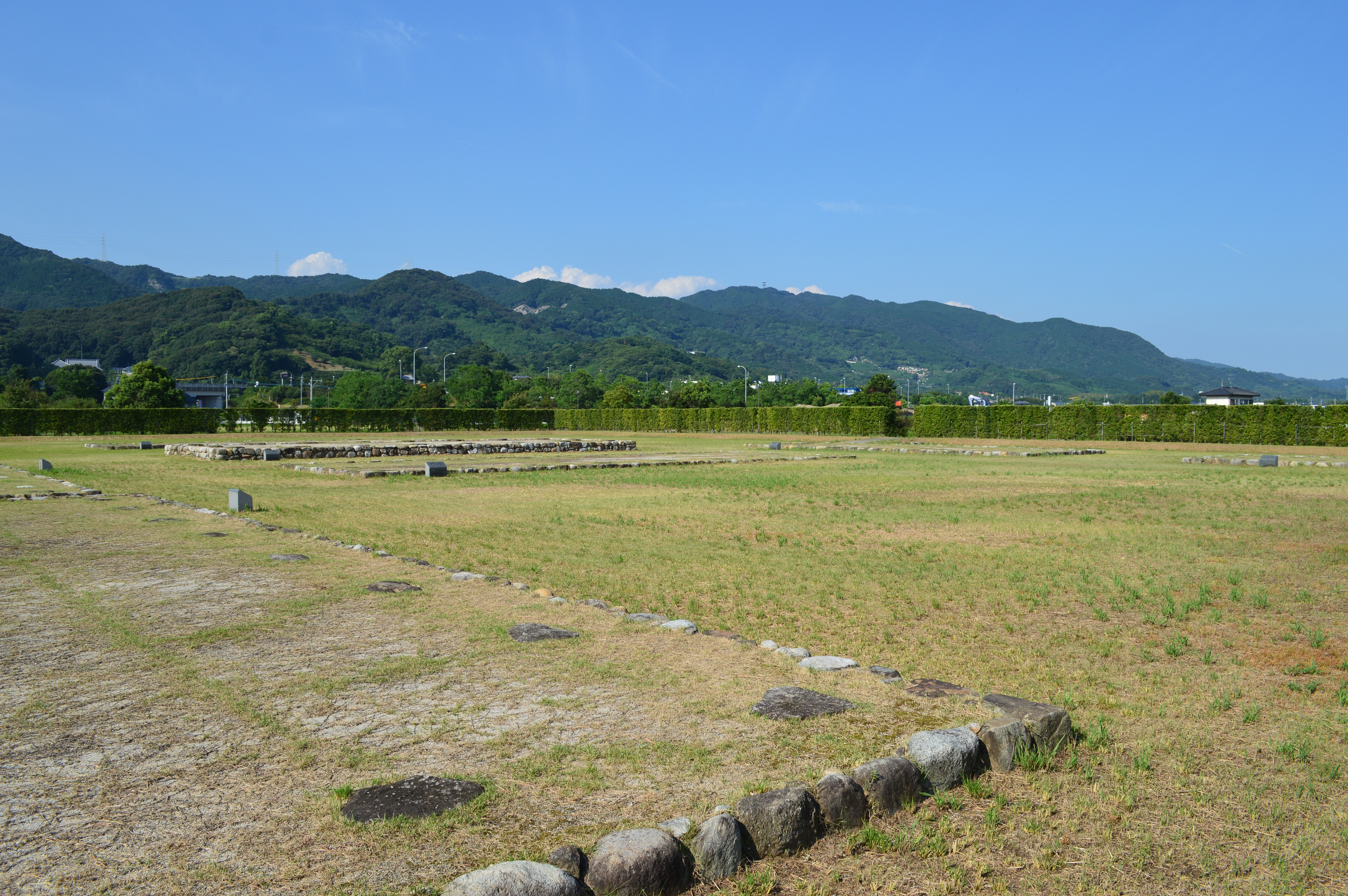
Hizen Kokuchō Site in Saga

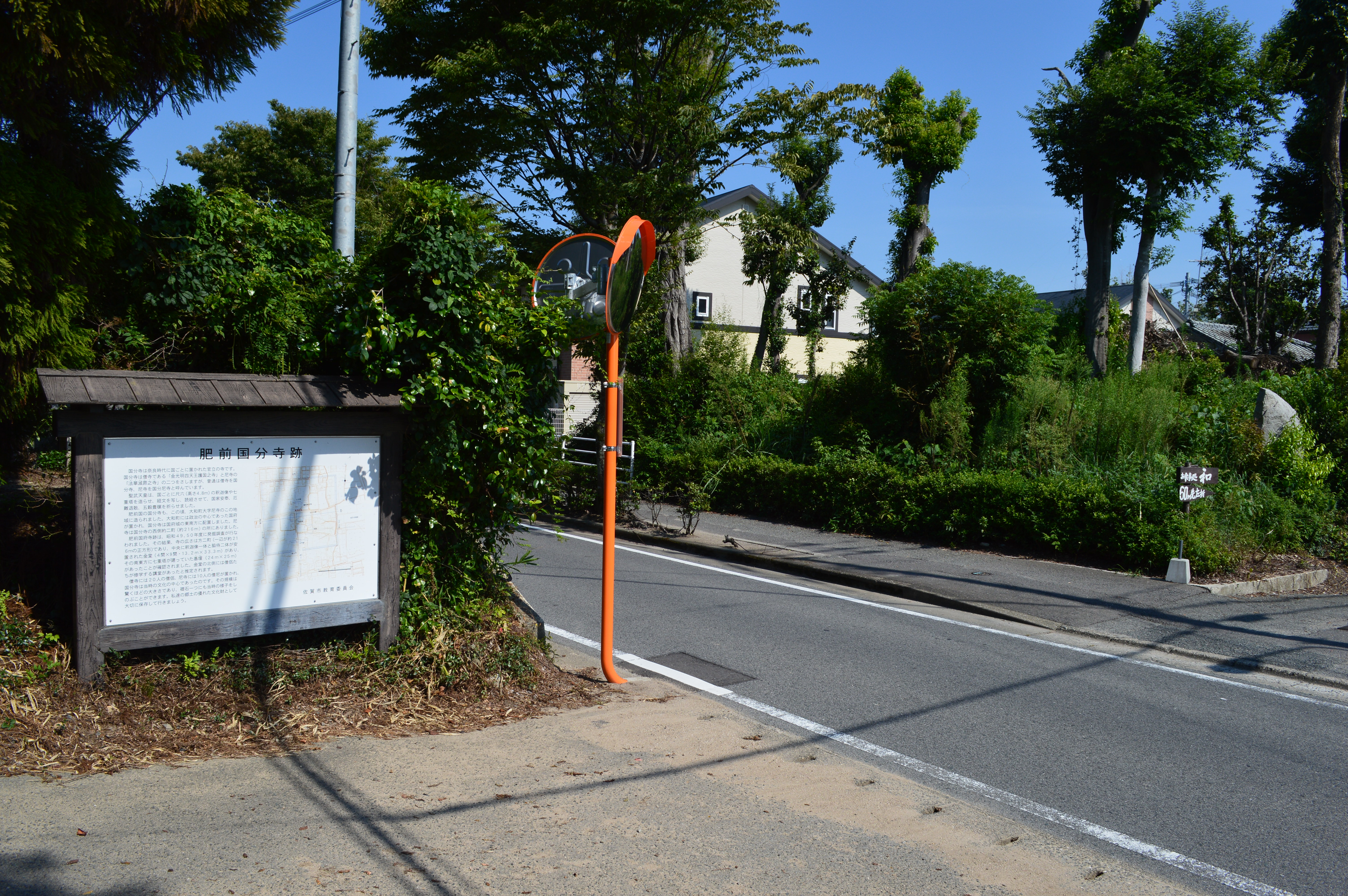
Hizen Kokubun-ji Site in Saga

Hizen Province (肥前国, Hizen no Kuni; Japanese pronunciation: [çí.(d͡)zè̞ɴ̀, -(d͡)zè̞ǹ nò̞ kɯ̈̀.ɲ̟ì]) was an old province of Japan in the area of the Saga and Nagasaki prefectures. It was sometimes called Hishū (肥州), with Higo Province. Hizen bordered on the provinces of Chikuzen and Chikugo. The province was included in Saikaidō. It did not include the island provinces (now municipalities) of Tsushima and Iki that are now part of modern Nagasaki Prefecture.

== History ==
The name "Hizen" dates from the Nara period Ritsuryō Kokugunri system reforms, when the province was divided from Higo Province. The name appears in the early chronicle Shoku Nihongi from 696 AD. The ancient provincial capital of Hizen was located near Yamato City.

During the late Muromachi period, the province was the site of much early contact between Japan and Portuguese and Spanish merchants and missionaries. Hirado, and later Nagasaki became major foreign trade centers, and a large percentage of the population converted to Roman Catholicism. Toyotomi Hideyoshi directed the invasion of Korea from the city of Nagoya, in Hizen, and after the suppression of foreign contacts and prohibition against the Kirishitan religion, the Shimabara Rebellion also took place in Hizen province.

=== List of han ===
During the Edo period, Hizen Province was divided among several daimyōs, but dominated by the Nabeshima clan, whose domain was centered at the castle town of Saga. At the end of the Tokugawa shogunate, Hizen was divided between the following han:

| Domain | Daimyō | Revenue (koku) | Type |
| Saga Domain | Nabeshima | 357,000 | tozama |
| Ogi Domain | Nabeshima | 73,000 | tozama |
| Shimabara Domain | Matsudaira | 70,000 | fudai |
| Hirado Domain | Matsuura | 61,000 | tozama |
| Karatsu Domain | Ogasawara | 60,000 | fudai |
| Hasunoike Domain | Nabeshima | 52,000 | tozama |
| Ōmura Domain | Ōmura | 28,000 | tozama |
| Kashima Domain | Nabeshima | 20,000 | tozama |
| Fukue Domain | Gotō | 12,000 | tozama |

During this period, the port of Nagasaki remained a tenryō territory, administered for the Tokugawa government by the Nagasaki bugyō, and contained the Dutch East India Company trading post of Dejima. After the Meiji Restoration in 1868 came the abolition of the han system in 1871, whereby all daimyo were obliged to surrender their domains to the new Meiji government, which then divided the nation into numerous prefectures, which were consolidated into 47 prefectures and 3 urban areas by 1888. The former Hizen province was divided into modern Saga Prefecture and a portion of Nagasaki Prefecture. At the same time, the province continued to exist for some purposes. For example, Hizen is explicitly recognized in treaties in 1894 (a) between Japan and the United States and (b) between Japan and the United Kingdom.

== Historical districts ==
- Saga Prefecture
  - Fujitsu District (藤津郡)
  - Kanzaki District (神埼郡)
  - Kii District (基肄郡) – merged with Mine and Yabu Districts to become Miyaki District (三養基郡) on March 26, 1896
  - Kishima District (杵島郡)
  - Mine District (三根郡) – merged with Kii and Yabu Districts to become Miyaki District on March 26, 1896
  - Ogi District (小城郡) – dissolved
  - Saga District (佐賀郡) – dissolved
  - Yabu District (養父郡) – merged with Kii and Mine Districts to become Miyaki District on March 26, 1896
- Nagasaki Prefecture
  - Sonogi District (彼杵郡)
    - Higashisonogi District (東彼杵郡)
    - Nishisonogi District (西彼杵郡)
    - Nagasaki-shi (長崎市)
  - Takaki District (高来郡)
    - Kitatakaki District (北高来郡) – dissolved
    - Minamitakaki District (南高来郡) – dissolved
- Mixed
  - Matsuura District (松浦郡)
    - Higashimatsuura District (東松浦郡) – part of Nagasaki Prefecture; transferred to Saga Prefecture in 1883 (along with Nishimatsuura District)
    - Kitamatsuura District (北松浦郡) – part of Nagasaki Prefecture
    - Minamimatsuura District (南松浦郡) – part of Nagasaki Prefecture
    - Nishimatsuura District (西松浦郡) – part of Nagasaki Prefecture; transferred to Saga Prefecture in 1883 (along with Higashimatsuura District)

== Maps ==
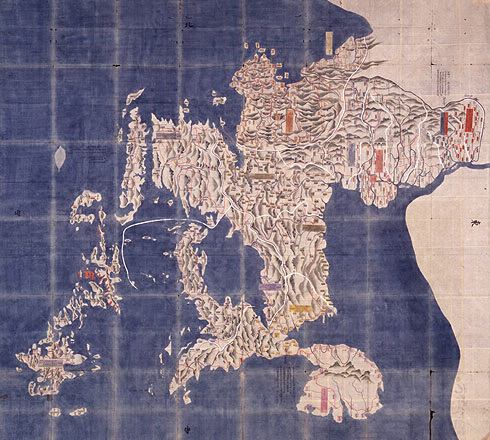
Keichō Kuniezu - Hizen Province (1837 copy of lost c.1605 original) (Takeo City Library and Historical Museum)

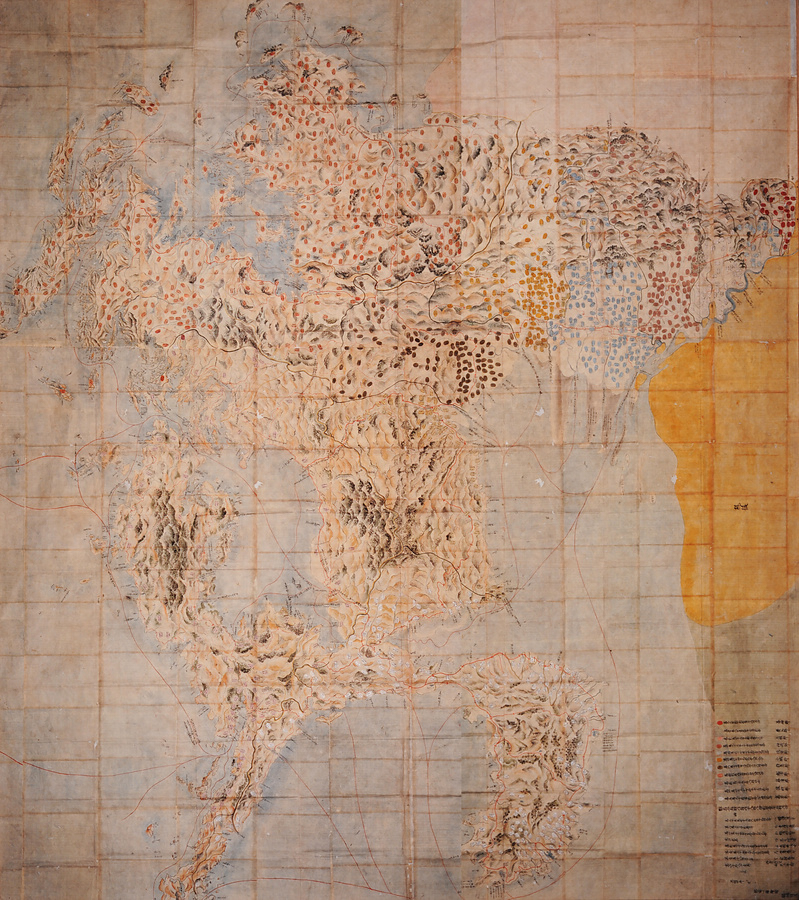
Shōhō Kuniezu - Hizen Province (1647) (Chōkokan)

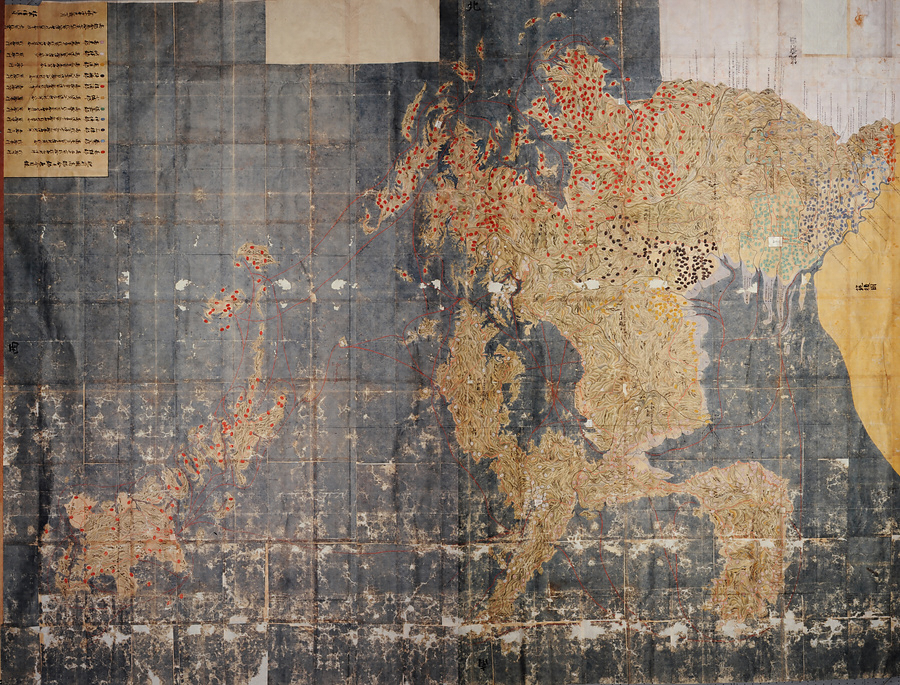
Genroku Kuniezu - Hizen Province (1701) (Chōkokan)

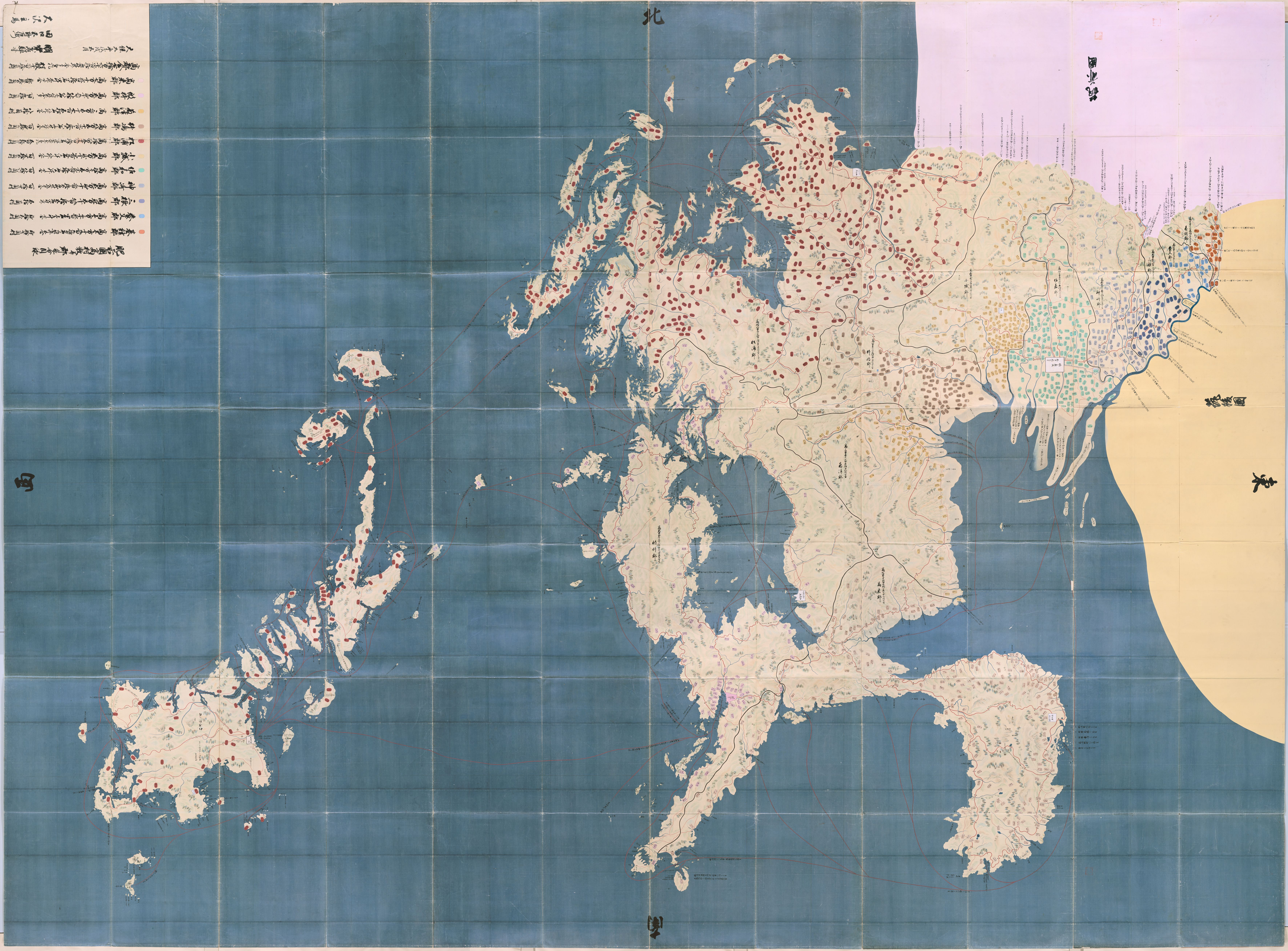
Tenpō Kuniezu - Hizen Province, with Chikuzen in pink and Chikugo in yellow (1838) (National Archives of Japan)

== See also ==
- List of Historic Sites of Japan (Nagasaki)
- List of Historic Sites of Japan (Saga)
- Nagasaki Museum of History and Culture
- Saga Prefectural Museum

== Other websites ==
Media related to Hizen Province at Wikimedia Commons

- Murdoch's map of provinces, 1903
- National Archives of Japan: Hinozenshu sanbutsu zuko, scroll showing illustrated inventory of industries in Karatsu Domain, 1773-1784
