= Asano clan =

Japanese samurai clan with Minamoto heritage

Asano 浅野
- Asano clan mon
- Home province: Mino; Owari; Aki; Bingo; Harima
- Parent house: Minamoto clan Toki clan Ashikaga clan Hatakeyama clan
- Titles: Various
- Founder: Asano Mitsutoki (浅野光時)
- Final ruler: Asano Nagayuki (浅野長勲)
- Current head: Asano Nagataka (浅野長孝)
- Founding year: 1221
- Ruled until: 1868

The Asano clan (淺野氏, Asano-shi) was a Japanese samurai clan that descended from the Minamoto clan, and the Emperor Seiwa (850-881), the 56th Emperor of Japan. The Main Lineage (sōke, 宗家) were Lords (daimyō) of the Hiroshima Domain in Aki Province and another famous branch family were Lords of the Akō Domain in Harima Province associated with the story of the Forty-seven rōnin. Their inherited character is "長". The family came to prominence when the sister of Asano Nagamasa married Toyotomi Hideyoshi.

After the Meiji Restoration and the abolition of the han system, the Asano clan became part of the new nobility.

== Origins ==
The Asano clan are a branch the Toki clan (土岐氏) who descend from Minamoto no Yorimitsu (源頼光) of the Seiwa Genji (清和源氏). The Toki clan's main residence was in the Toki District (土岐郡) of Mino Province from which they took their name.

Minamoto no Mitsuhira (源光衡) was the third son of Minamoto no Mitsunaga (源光長) who was killed in battle during the Genpei War. His uncle Minamoto no Mitsumoto (源光基) adopted him and he founded the Toki clan becoming Toki Mitsuhira (土岐光衡). His first son Toki Mitsuyuki (土岐光行) continued the clan but his second son Toki Mitsutoki (土岐光時) took the name Asano and became founder of the Asano clan. He resided at Asano, Toki district (Mino province) and took the name of the place.

Seiwa-tennō (清和天皇, 850–878)
 　┃
Sadazumi-shinnō (貞純親王, 873–916)
 　┃
Minamoto no Tsunemoto (源經基, 894–961)
 　┃
Minamoto no Mitsunaka (源満仲, 912?–997)
 　┃
Minamoto no Yorimitsu (源頼光, 948–1021)
 　┃
Minamoto no Yorikuni (源頼国, ?–1058?)
 　┃
Minamoto no Kunifusa (源国房, ?–1119)
 　┃
Minamoto no Mitsukuni (源光国, 1063–1148)
 　┃
Minamoto no Mitsunobu (源光信, 1093?–1145)
 　┃
Minamoto no Mitsunaga (源光長, ?–1184)
 　┃
Toki Mitsuhira (土岐光衡, 1159–1206)
 　┃
Asano Mitsutoki (浅野光時, ?–?)

== Asano Nagamasa (1546-1611) ==
He was the son of Yasui Shigetsugu, Lord of Miyago castle (Owari province), a descendant of Hatakeyama Iekuni, Shugo (Governor) of Kawachi province, descending from Ashikaga Yoshikane (1154-1199) of the Seiwa-Genji. Yoshikane was the third son of Minamoto no Yoshiyasu, also called Ashikaga Yoshiyasu (1127-1157), founder of the Ashikaga clan, grandson of the Chinjufu-shōgun (Commander-in-chief of the defense of the North) Minamoto no Yoshiie (1039-1106), and a descendant of the Emperor Seiwa (850-881), the 56th Emperor of Japan.

Nagamasa was adopted by his maternal uncle, Asano Nagakatsu, Lord of Asano castle, younger brother of his mother, and succeeded him as the fourteenth head of the Asano clan.

Until Nagakatsu, the Asano descended directly from Minamoto no Yorimitsu (948-1021) and the Toki clan, and after Nagamasa, the Asano are direct descendants of the Hatakeyama clan and the Ashikaga clan.

== Branches ==
=== Makabe Domain (真壁藩), Hitachi (50,000 koku) ===
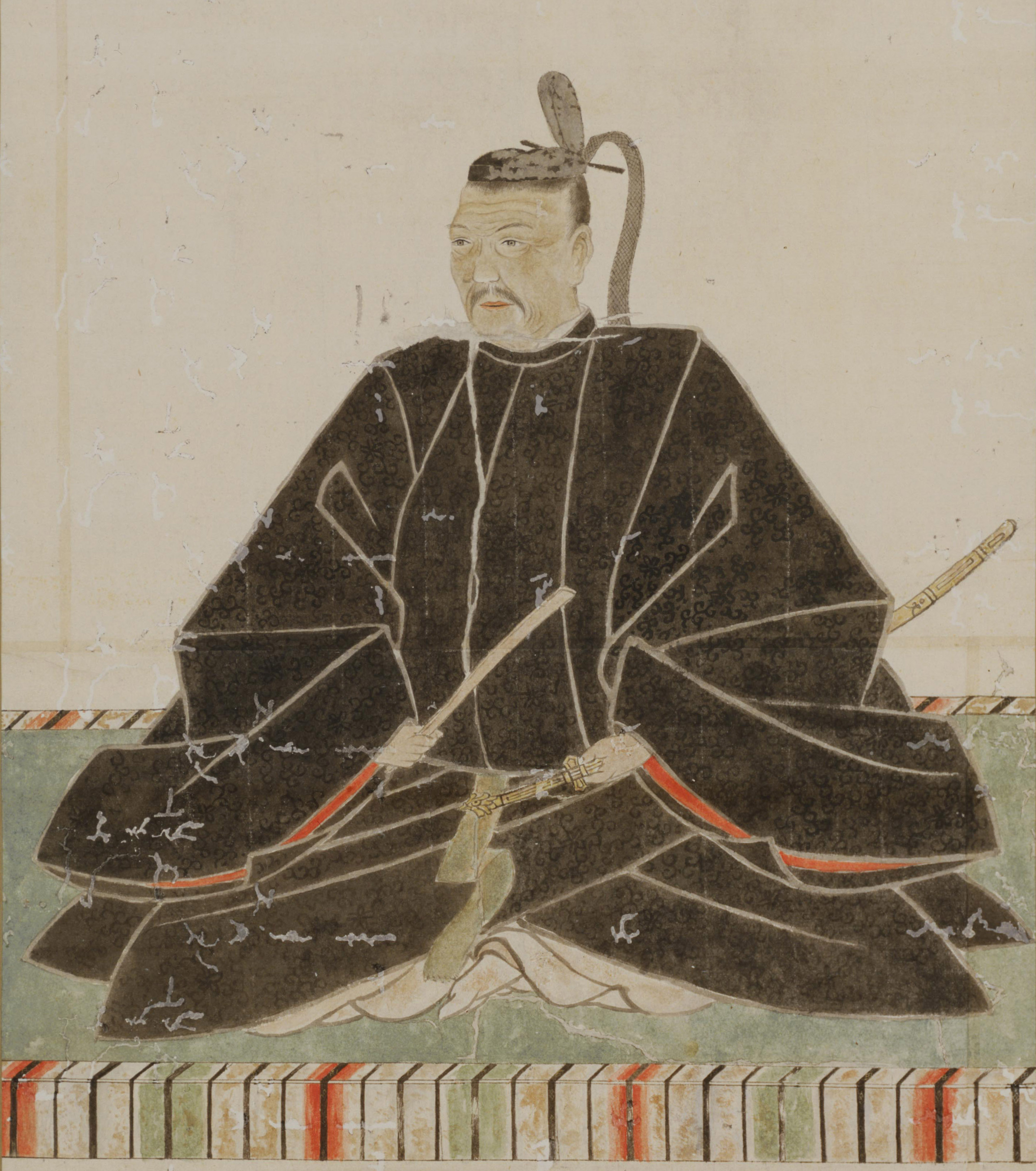
Asano Nagamasa (1546–1611)

- Asano Nagamasa (浅野長政, 1546–1611) - brother-in-law of Toyotomi Hideyoshi.
- Asano Nagashige (浅野長重, 1588–1632) - 3rd son of Asano Nagamasa.

=== Kishū Domain (紀州藩), Kii (376,000 koku) ===
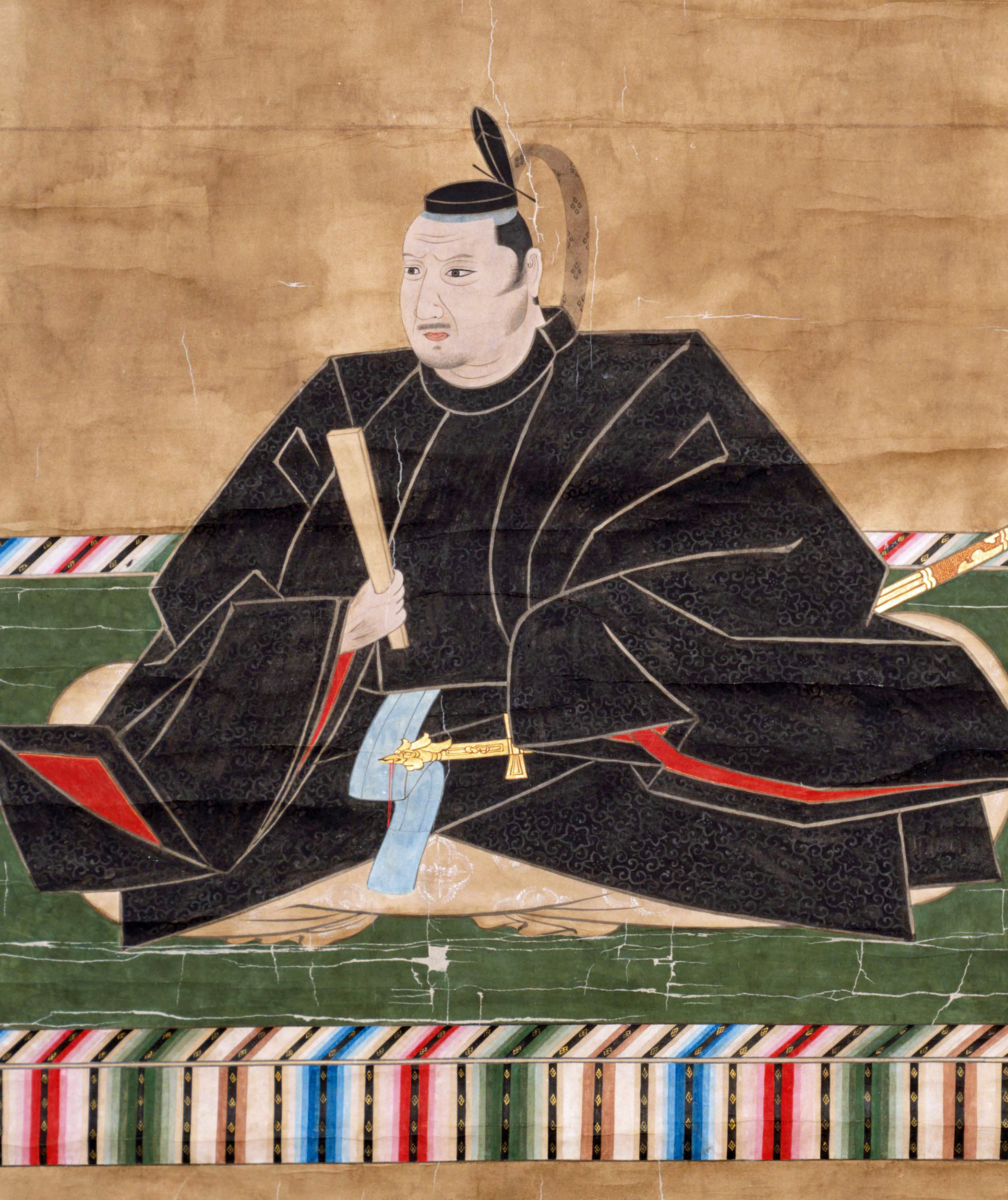
Asano Yoshinaga (1576–1613), 1st son of Asano Nagamasa

- Asano Yoshinaga (浅野幸長, 1576–1613) - 1st son of Asano Nagamasa.
- Asano Nagaakira (浅野長晟, 1586–1632) - 2nd son of Asano Nagamasa, transferred to Hiroshima Domain.

=== Mooka Domain (真岡藩), Shimotsuke (20,000 koku) ===
- Asano Nagashige (浅野長重, 1588–1632) - 3rd son of Asano Nagamasa.

=== Kasama Domain (笠間藩), Hitachi (53,500 koku) ===
- Asano Nagashige (浅野長重, 1588–1632) - 3rd son of Asano Nagamasa.
- Asano Naganao (浅野長直, 1610–1672) - eldest son of Nagashige, transferred to Akō Domain in 1645.

=== Hiroshima Domain (広島藩), Aki (426,500 koku) ===
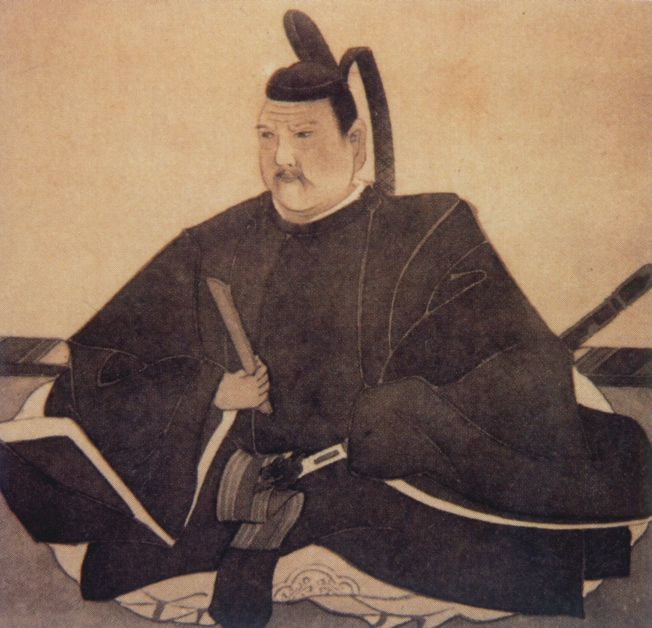
Asano Nagaakira, first Asano daimyō of Hiroshima.

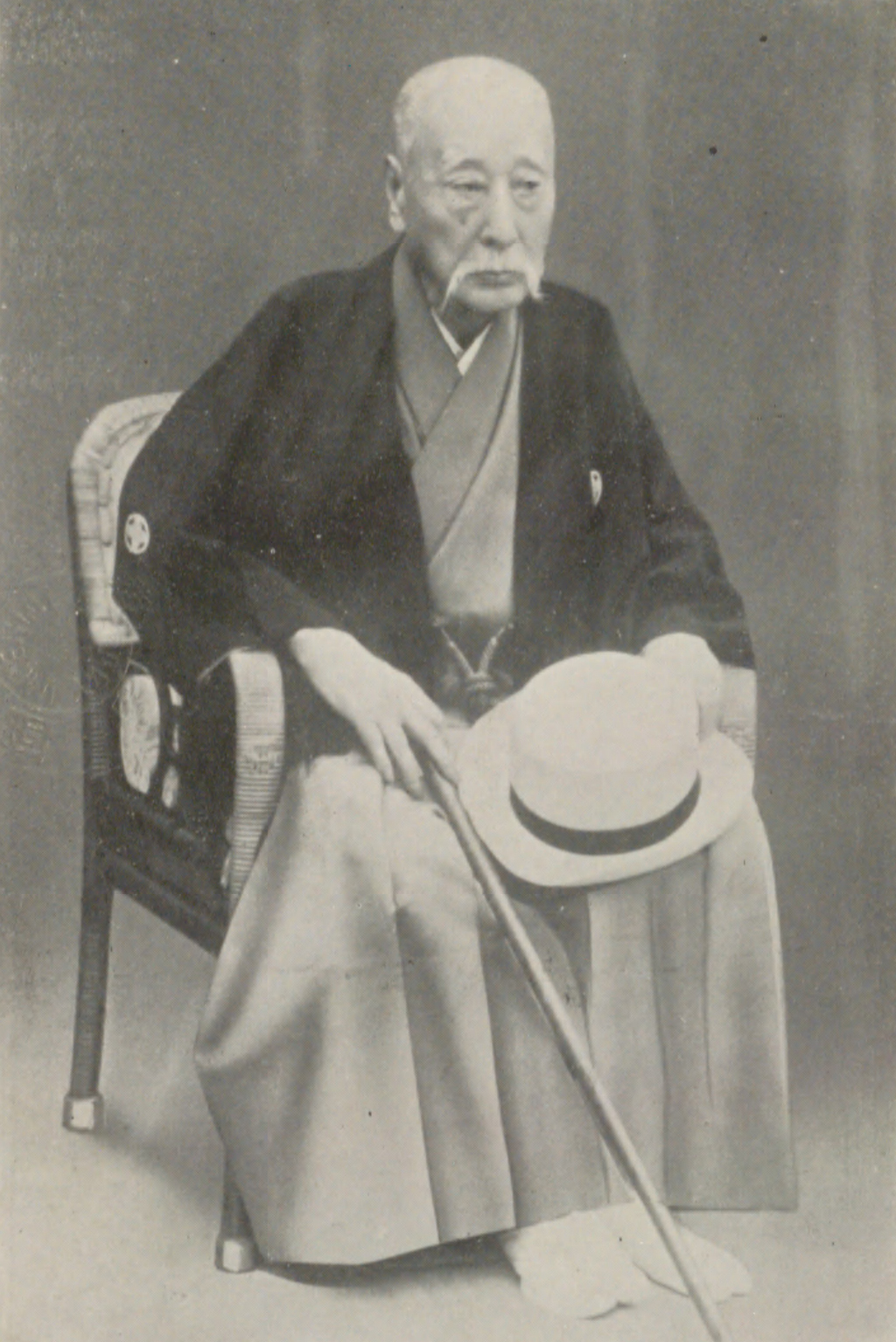
Asano Nagakoto, last daimyō of Hiroshima.

- Asano Nagaakira (浅野長晟, 1586–1632) - 2nd son of Asano Nagamasa.
- Asano Mitsuakira (浅野光晟, 1617–1693)
- Asano Tsunaakira (浅野綱晟, 1637–1673)
- Asano Tsunanaga (浅野綱長, 1659–1708)
- Asano Yoshinaga (浅野吉長, 1681–1752)
- Asano Munetsune (浅野宗恒, 1717–1788)
- Asano Shigeakira (浅野重晟, 1743–1814)
- Asano Narikata (浅野斉賢, 1773–1831)
- Asano Naritaka (浅野斉粛, 1817–1868)
- Asano Yoshiteru (浅野慶熾, 1836–1858)
- Asano Nagamichi (浅野長訓, 1812–1872)
- Asano Nagakoto (浅野長勲, 1842–1937)

=== Hiroshima-Shinden Domain, Aki (30,000 koku) ===
- Asano Nagakata (浅野長賢, 1693–1744) - 3rd son of Asano Tsunanaga of the Hiroshima Domain.
- Asano Nagataka (浅野長喬, 1732–1770)
- Asano Nagakazu (浅野長員, 1745–1808)
- Asano Nagakane (浅野長容, 1770–1824)
- Asano Nagamichi (浅野長訓, 1812–1872) - later Lord of the Hiroshima Domain.
- Asano Nagaoki (浅野長興, 1842–1937) - later Lord of the Hiroshima Domain as Asano Nagakoto (浅野長勲).
- Asano Nagaatsu (浅野長厚, 1843–1873)

=== Mihara Domain (三原藩), Bingo (30,000 koku) ===
- Asano Tadayoshi (浅野忠吉, 1546–1621) - son of Asano Nagatada (浅野長忠), making him 1st cousin of Asano Nagamasa.
- Asano Tadanaga (浅野忠長, 1592–1660)
- Asano Tadazane (浅野忠真, 1618–1694)
- Asano Tadayoshi (浅野忠義, 1667–1701)
- Asano Tadamasa (浅野忠綏, ?–?)
- Asano Tadachika (浅野忠晨, ?–?)
- Asano Tadamasa (浅野忠正, ?–?)
- Asano Tadayoshi (浅野忠愛, ?–?)
- Asano Tadasuke (浅野忠順, 1790–1824)
- Asano Tadahide (浅野忠敬, 1802–1860)
- Asano Tetsu (浅野忠, 1819–1892)

=== Akō Domain (赤穂藩), Harima (53,000 koku) ===
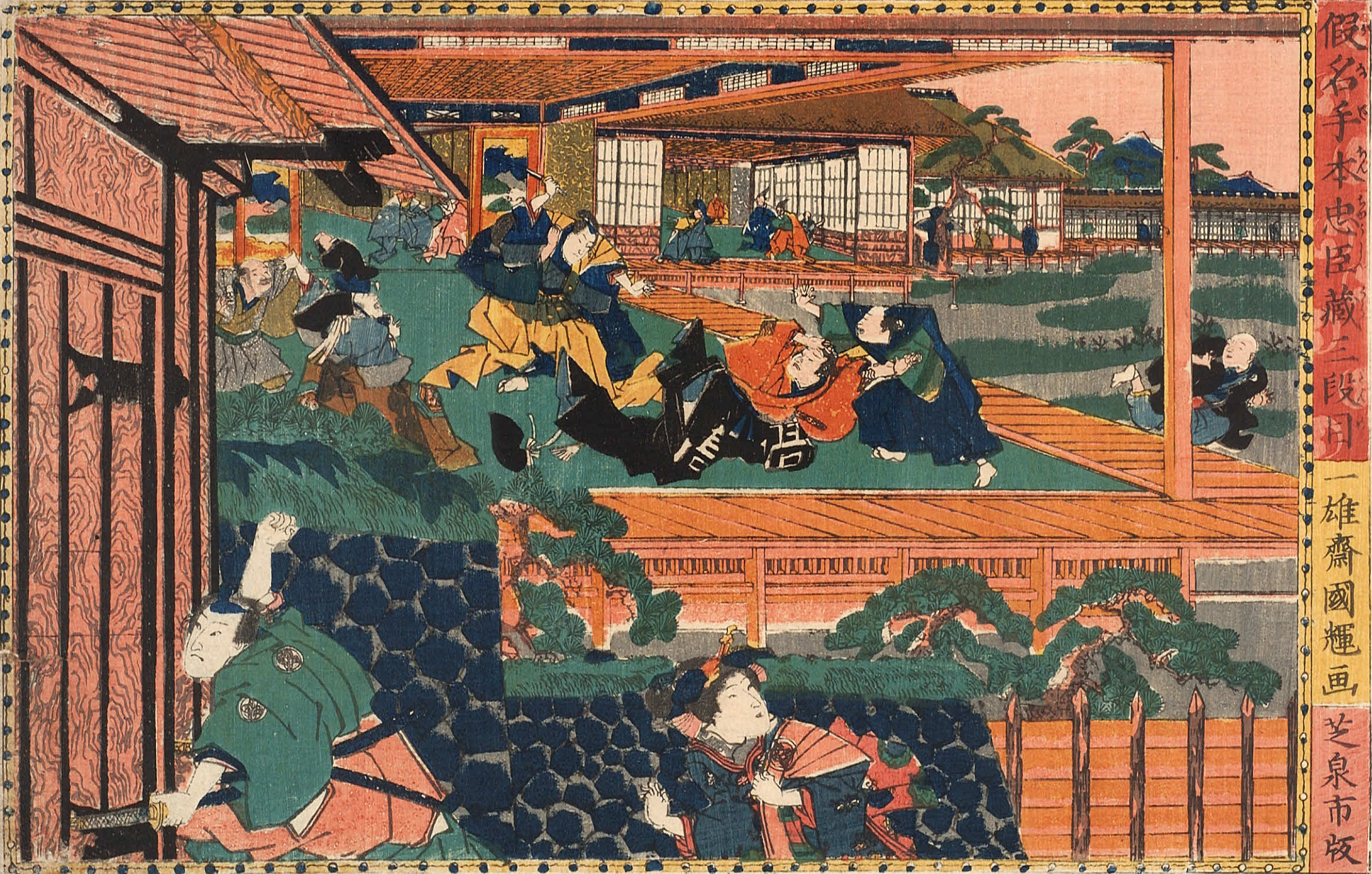
Ukiyo-e depicting the assault of Asano Naganori on Kira Yoshinaka in the Matsu no Ōrōka of Edo Castle

- Asano Naganao (浅野長直, 1610–1672)
- Asano Nagatomo (浅野長友, 1643–1675)
- Asano Naganori (浅野長矩, 1667–1701) - famous for being the lord of the Forty-seven rōnin.

=== Miyoshi Domain (三次藩), Bingo (50,000 koku) ===
- Asano Nagaharu (浅野長治, 1614–1675)
- Asano Nagateru (浅野長照, 1652–1705)
- Asano Nagazumi (浅野長澄, 1671–1718)
- Asano Nagatsune (浅野長経, 1709–1719)
- Asano Nagazane (浅野長寔, 1713–1720)

=== Tōjō Domain (東城藩), Bingo (10,000 koku) ===
- Asano Takakatsu (浅野高勝, 1538–1613) - adopted by Asano clan, formerly Horita Takakatsu (堀田高勝)
- Asano Takakana (浅野高英)
- Asano Takatsugu (浅野高次)
- Asano Takanao (浅野高尚)
- Asano Takakata (浅野高方)
- Asano Shunso (浅野俊峰)
- Asano Takaaki (浅野高明)
- Asano Michiyasu (浅野道寧)
- Asano Takakage (浅野高景)
- Asano Takamichi (浅野高通)
- Asano Takahira (浅野高平)
- Asano Michihiro (浅野道博)
- Asano Michioki (浅野道興)
- Asano Michitoshi (浅野道敏)
- Asano Morio (浅野守夫, 1856–1938) - 6th son of Asano Nagaatsu of the Hiroshima-Shoden Domain.

== Significant Members ==
- Asano Nagamasa (1526–1610), brother-in-law of Toyotomi Hideyoshi, fought for him in Japan and Korea
- Asano Yoshinaga (1556–1613), 1st son of Nagamasa. Also served under Hideyoshi, in both Japanese campaigns, and the Korean invasions
- Asano Nagaakira (1536–1632), brother of Yukinaga, first Asano lord of the Hiroshima Domain.
- Asano Naganori (1647–1701), lord of the Forty-seven rōnin

== In popular culture ==
The Asano clan of the Sengoku period led by Sōju Asano, and his daughter Sara from the anime of Inuyasha.

== See also ==
- Hiroshima Castle
- Hiroshima Domain
- Mihara Castle
- Mihara Domain
- Akō Domain
- Kishū Domain
- Kasama Domain
