= Hiroshima Castle =

Fortress in Japan

Hiroshima Castle 広島城
- Hiroshima, Japan
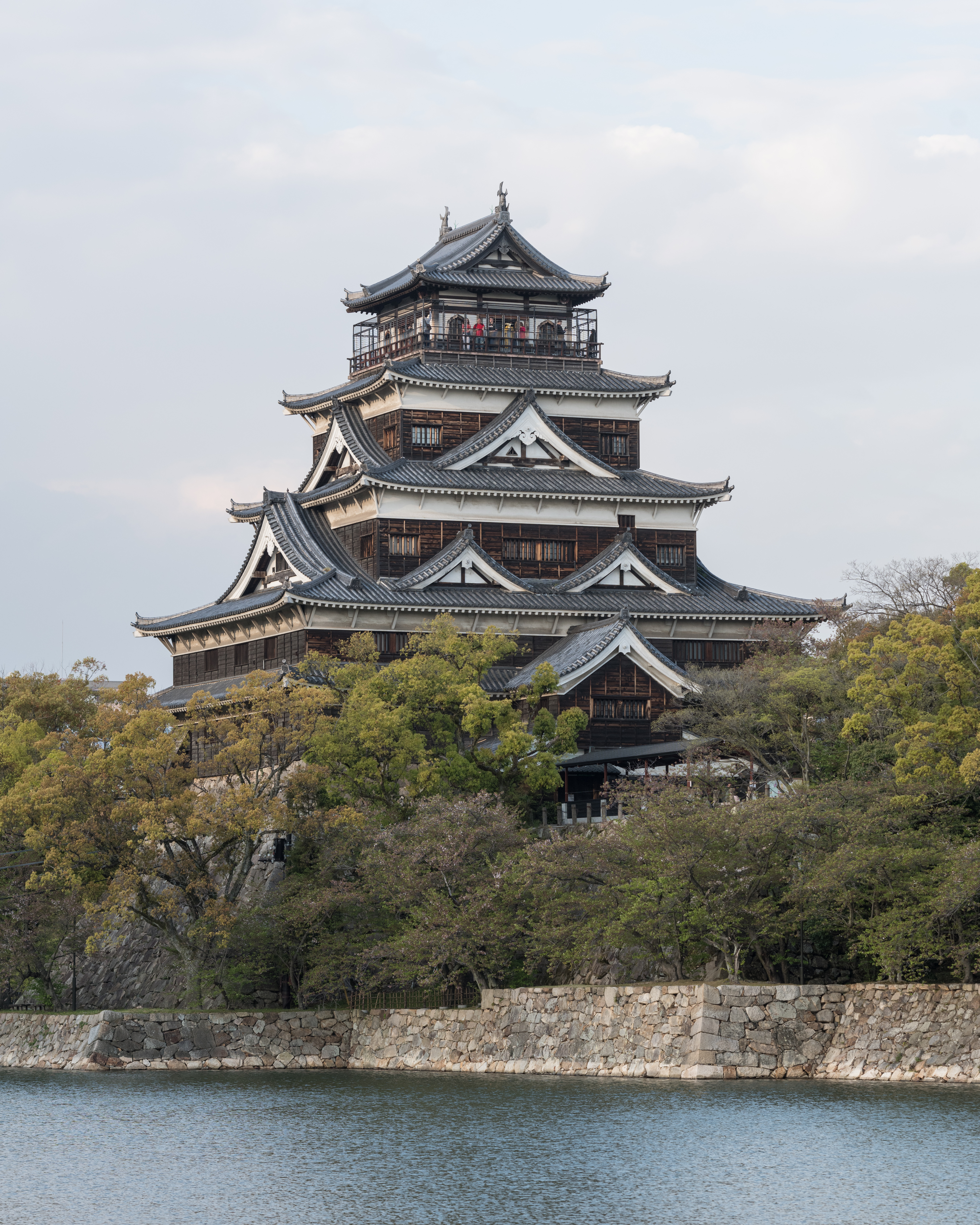
- Reconstructed main keep

Site information
- Type: Azuchi-Momoyama castle
- Controlled by: Mōri clan (1592–1600), Fukushima Masanori (1600–1619), Asano clan (1619–1869), Japan (1869–1945), Japan (1958–present)
- Condition: Reconstructed, serves as history museum
- Website: https://www.rijo-castle.jp/

Location
- Coordinates: 34°24′10″N 132°27′33″E
- Height: 12.4 meters (stone base), 26.6 meters (reconstructed keep, five stories)

Site history
- Built: 1592–1599 (original); 1958 (reconstruction)
- Built by: Mōri Terumoto
- In use: 1592–1945
- Materials: stone, wood, plaster walls (original); concrete, steel, wood, stone, plaster (reconstruction)
- Demolished: 6 August 1945 as a result of the atomic bombing.

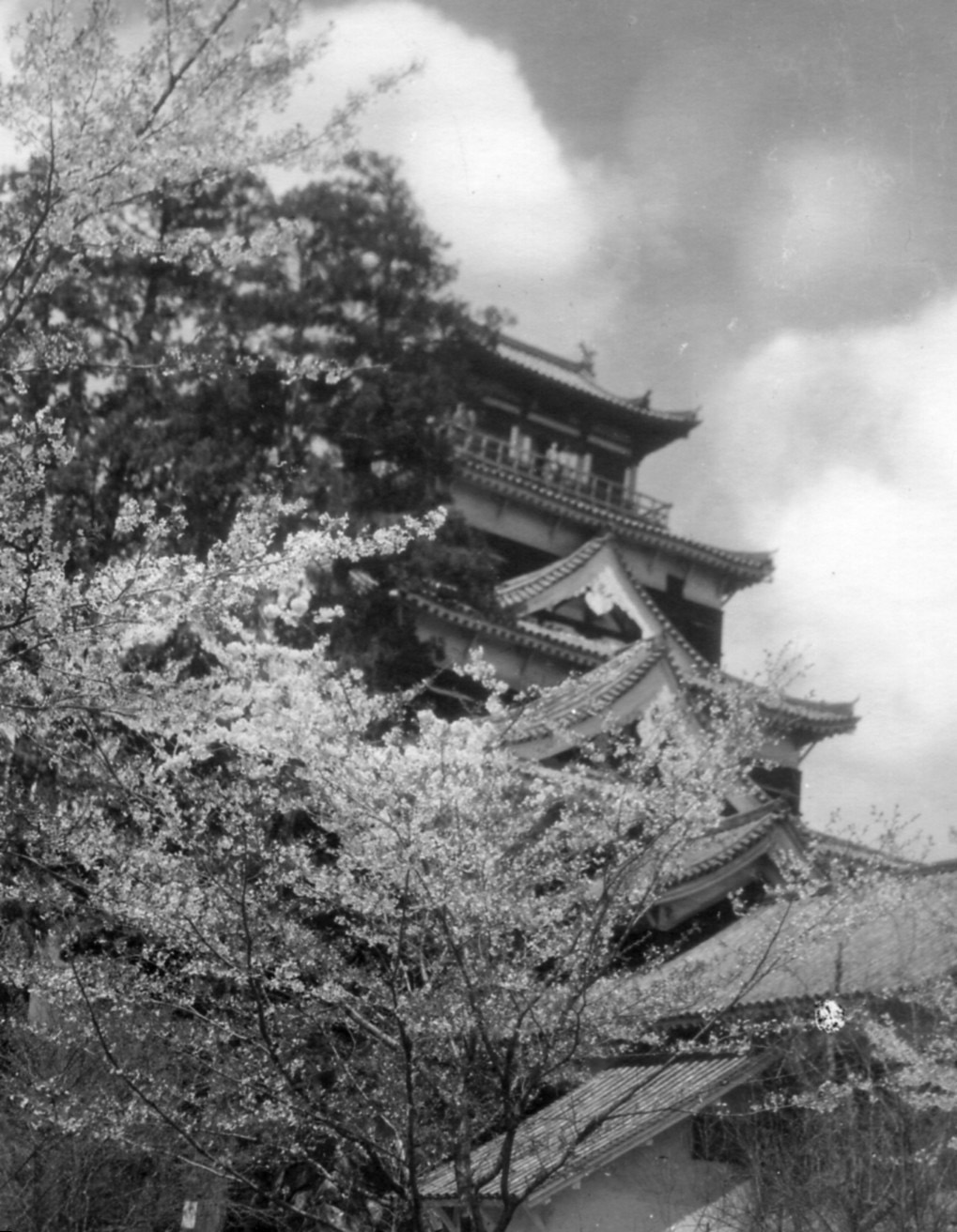
The tenshu prior to its destruction in 1945

Hiroshima Castle (広島城, Hiroshima-jō), sometimes called Carp Castle (鯉城, Rijō), is a castle in Hiroshima, Japan that was the residence of the daimyō (feudal lord) of the Hiroshima Domain. The castle was originally constructed in the 1590s, but much of it was dismantled in the Meiji era, and what remained was largely destroyed by the atomic bombing on August 6, 1945. The main keep was rebuilt in 1958, a replica of the original that now serves as a museum of Hiroshima's history before the Second World War, and other castle buildings have been reconstructed since.

== History ==
Mōri Terumoto, one of Toyotomi Hideyoshi's council of Five Elders, built Hiroshima castle between 1589 and 1599. It was located on the delta of the Ōta River (Ōtagawa). There was no Hiroshima city or town at the time, and the area was called Gokamura, meaning "five villages". Beginning in 1591, Mōri Terumoto moved from Yoshida-Kōriyama Castle and governed nine provinces from this castle, including much of what are now Shimane, Yamaguchi, Tottori, Okayama and Hiroshima Prefectures.

When construction on the castle began, Gokamura was renamed Hiroshima, as a more impressive name was called for. "Hiro" was taken from Ōe no Hiromoto, an ancestor of the Mōri family, and "Shima" was taken from Fukushima Motonaga, who helped Mōri Terumoto choose the castle site. Some accounts state that the name "Hiroshima", meaning "wide island", comes from the existence of several large islands in the delta of the Otagawa, near the castle's site.

Following the battle of Sekigahara in 1600, Mōri was forced out of the castle, retreating to Hagi in today's Yamaguchi Prefecture. Fukushima Masanori became the lord of Aki and Bingo Provinces (which today make up Hiroshima Prefecture) and of Hiroshima castle. However, the new Tokugawa shogunate forbade any castle construction without permission from Edo; this was part of how the shogunate kept the daimyōs from gaining power and overthrowing the shogunate. When Fukushima repaired the castle following a flood in 1619, he was dispatched to Kawanakajima in today's Nagano Prefecture. Asano Nagaakira then became lord of the castle.

From 1619 until the abolition of the feudal system during the Meiji Restoration (1869), the Asano family were lords of Aki and Bingo Provinces.

After the Meiji Restoration, the castle came to serve as a military facility, and the Imperial General Headquarters was based there during the First Sino-Japanese War in 1894–1895. The foundations of several of the GHQ outbuildings, just a few hundred paces from the castle's main tower, remain today.

During the final months of World War II, the castle served as the headquarters of the 2nd General Army and Fifth Division, stationed there to deter the projected Allied invasion of the Japanese mainland. The tenshu (main keep) was destroyed in the atomic bomb blast of August 6, 1945, along with its attached buildings. For many years, it was believed the whole tenshu structure was blown away by the explosion that destroyed Hiroshima, but evidence newly discovered in 2010 suggests that the explosion only destroyed the lower pillars of the structure, and the rest of it collapsed as a result.

The present tower, constructed largely of concrete, was completed in 1958.

=== Daimyōs of Hiroshima ===
1. Mōri Terumoto (1591–1600)*; 1,120,000 koku
2. Fukushima Masanori (1600–1619); 498,223 koku
3. Asano Nagaakira (1619–1632); 426,500 koku**
4. Asano Mitsuakira (1632–1672)
5. Asano Tsunaakira (1672–1673)
6. Asano Tsunanaga (1673–1708)
7. Asano Yoshinaga (1708–1752)
8. Asano Munetsune (1752–1763)
9. Asano Shigeakira (1763–1799)
10. Asano Narikata (1799–1830)
11. Asano Naritaka (1831–1858)
12. Asano Yoshiteru (1858–1858)
13. Asano Nagamichi (1858–1869)
14. Asano Nagakoto (1869–1871)

*The years listed are those in which the lord occupied Hiroshima castle, not the years of his life.

**All of the lords after Asano Nagaakira enjoyed the same 426,500 koku.

== Structure ==
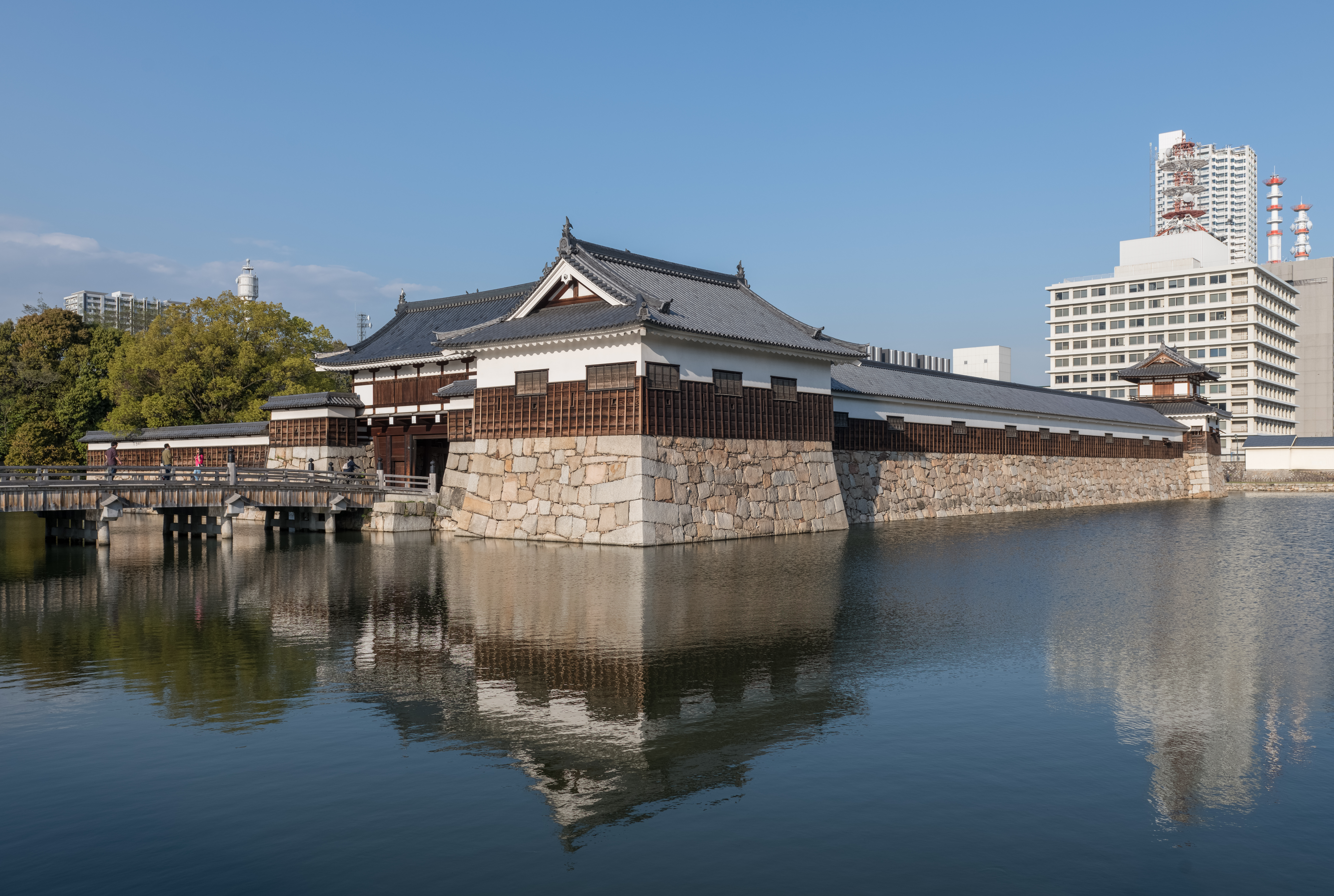
Part of the reconstructed ninomaru

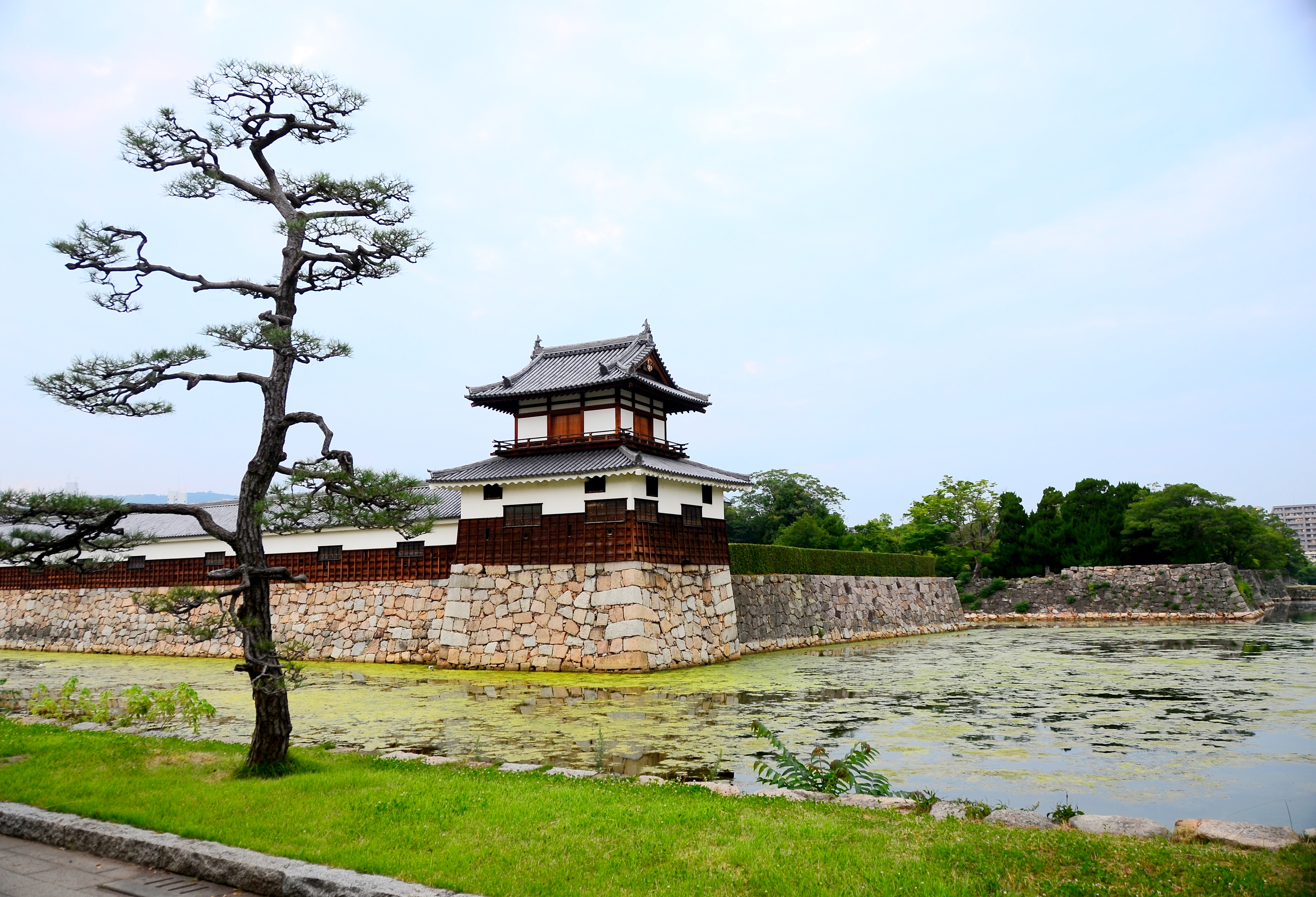
Part of the reconstructed castle

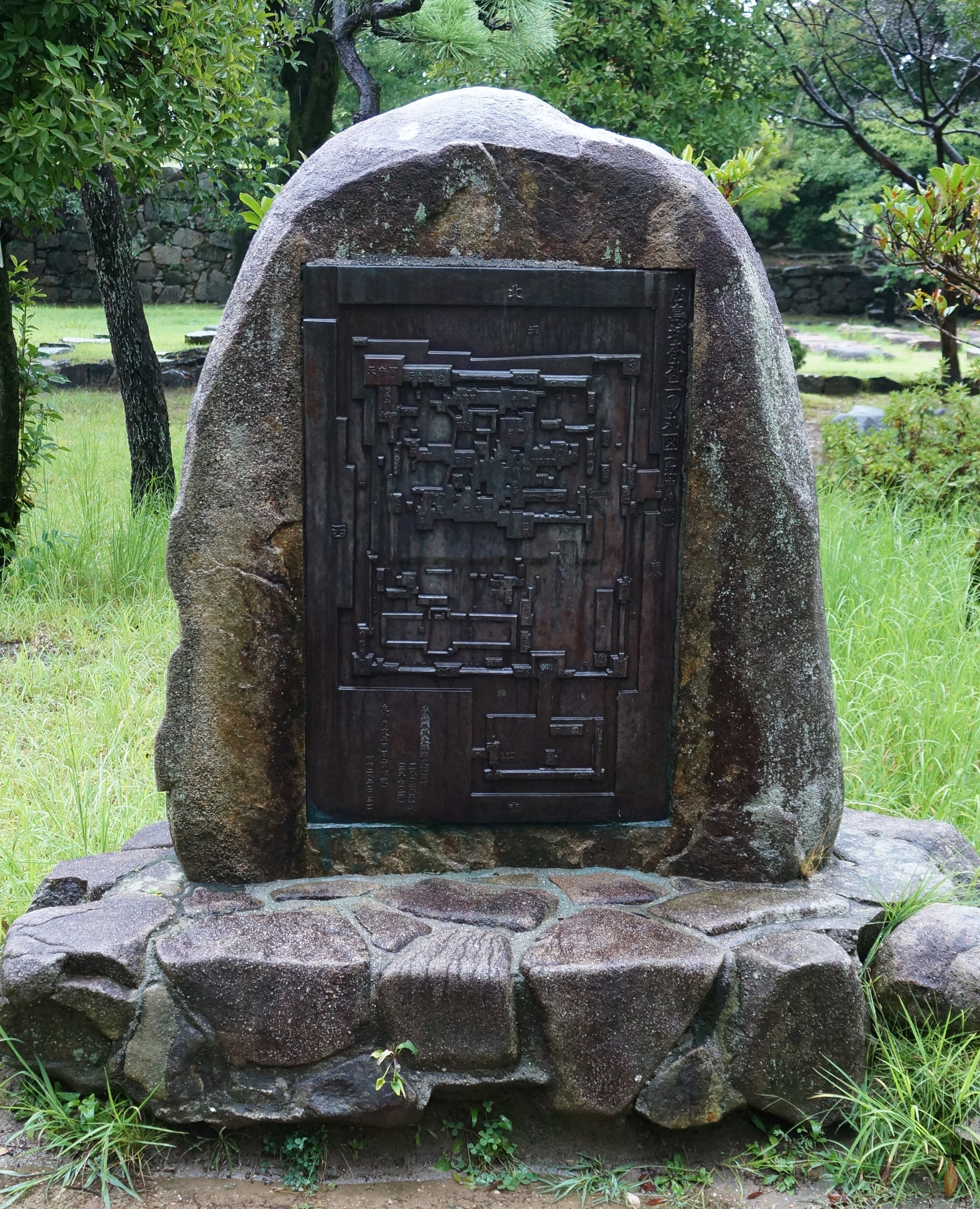
Map stone memorial

The castle buildings were originally constructed in wood, pine primarily, and the main keep had attached wings to the east and to the south. It was completed sometime between 1592 and 1599, and was designated a National Treasure in 1931. The reconstructed castle originally featured the main tower (tenshu) only, which is made primarily of reinforced concrete. Its five floors stand 26.6 meters (87 ft) above the stone foundation, which, in turn, is 12.4 meters (41 ft) high off the ground. However, in 1994, a gate and 3 yagura in the ninomaru were re-constructed out of wood using the original methods.

An excellent example of a hirajiro or flatlands (plains) castle, Hiroshima castle once had three concentric moats in addition to the Otagawa river to the west (now called the Hongawa), which provided an additional natural barrier. The two outer moats were filled in during the late 19th and early 20th centuries, and much of what was once within the castle grounds is now modern urban area, including homes, schools, offices and shops. A number of secondary castle buildings, towers and turrets once stood, and a Shinto shrine called Hiroshima Gokoku Jinja is located within the innermost moat, having been moved there after 1945.

Within the castle walls, three trees survived the atomic bombing: a eucalyptus and a willow at approximately 740 m from the hypocenter, and a holly approximately 935 m from the hypocenter. Both specimens are preserved just beyond the Honmaru. Also located inside the Honmaru is the concrete bunker from which the first radio broadcast out of Hiroshima following the atomic bombing was made.

== See also ==
- Hiroshima Tōshō-gū
