= Hiroshima Tōshō-gū =

Shrine in Higashi-ku, Hiroshima, Japan

Hiroshima Tōshō-gū 広島東照宮
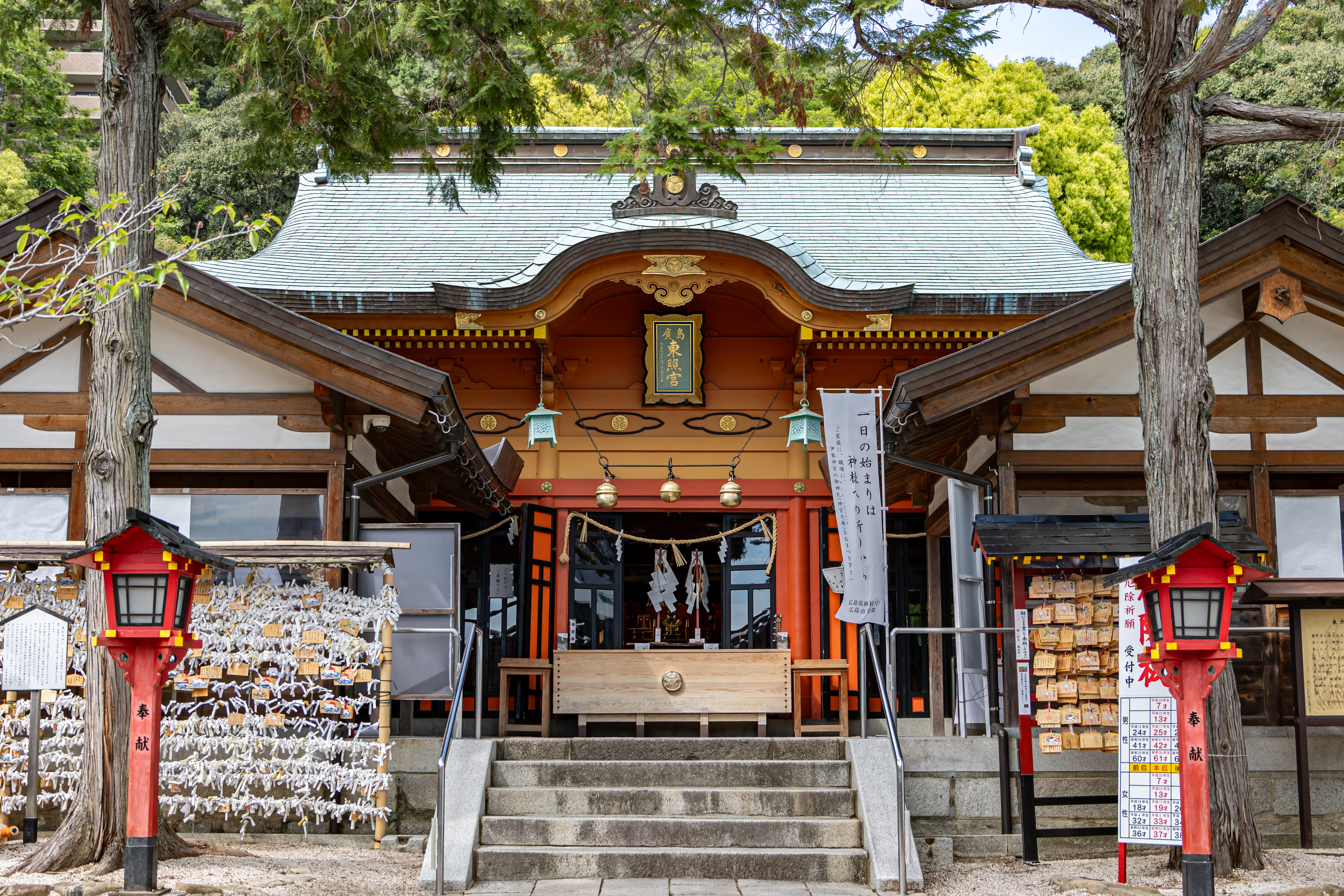
- Haiden (Worship Hall)

- Location within Japan

Religion
- Affiliation: Shinto
- Deity: Tokugawa Ieyasu
- Type: Tōshō-gū

Location
- Location: 2-1-18 Futaba-no-Sato, Higashi-ku, Hiroshima, Hiroshima Prefecture
- Interactive map of Hiroshima Tōshō-gū 広島東照宮
- Coordinates: 34.40349°N 132.47565°E

Architecture
- Established: 1648

Website
- www.hiroshima-toshogu.or.jp

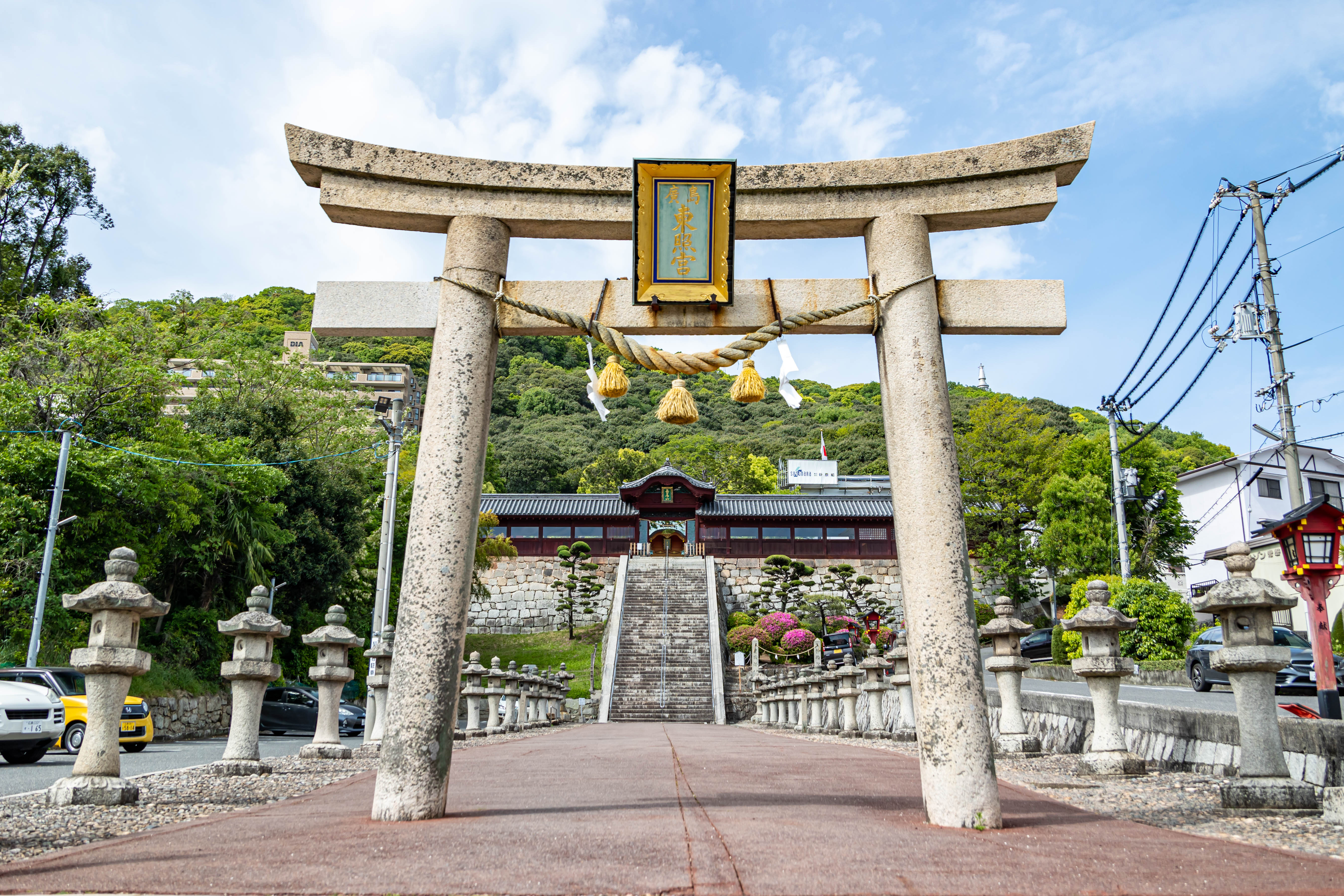
Torii at the entrance

Hiroshima Tōshō-gū (広島東照宮) is a Shinto shrine in Hiroshima, Hiroshima Prefecture, Japan. It is Tōshō-gū shrine, which enshrines the first Shōgun of the Tokugawa Shogunate, Tokugawa Ieyasu.

== Geography ==
This Toshogu is located on a hilltop 300 meters high on Mt.Futaba, which is located in the northeast direction of Hiroshima Castle. It is considered to be the kimon (鬼門) (Note: Kimon (鬼門) is a Japanese word that means "the gate of demons." It refers to the direction from which demons are believed to come. The concept of Kimon is an important concept in Yin-Yang philosophy. It is considered an inauspicious direction in the northeast, where negative energy and evil forces are thought to flow in. Therefore, in order to seal off the Kimon, shrines and temples were placed in the northeast direction of castles and towns.) of Hiroshima Castle. The Hiroshima Prefectural Shinto Association is located on the west side of the Toshogu Shrine, and the Kanemitsu Inari Shrine is located behind it.

== History ==
After the establishment of Nikkō Tōshō-gū Shrine by Tokugawa Iemitsu, the third shogun of the Tokugawa shogunate, he encouraged Daimyo throughout the country to build Tōshō-gū Shrines. As a result, Tōshō-gū Shrines were built all over Japan. The Hiroshima Tōshō-gū was built in 1648 by Asano Mitsuakira, the second Daimyo of the Hiroshima Domain, using a large amount of money from the domain. His birth mother, Shōsei-in, was the third daughter of Tokugawa Ieyasu, and being a grandson of Ieyasu, Asano Mitsuakira was particularly devoted to the construction of the Tōshō-gū Shrine. The construction of the Hiroshima Tōshō-gū began in 1646 and was completed in July 1648. The completion ceremony was held by Asano Mitsuakira, who wore the traditional formal attire of the Kuge and donated 300 koku of land to the shrine (Jisha-ryō). The most obvious reason for the construction of the Hiroshima Tōshō-gū was that Tokugawa Ieyasu was Mitsuakira's grandfather. However, another reason was that Mitsuakira wanted to show his loyalty to the Tokugawa shogunate by following the example of Ikeda Mitsumasa, the lord of the neighboring Okayama Domain, who built the first Tōshō-gū as Domain in 1645. Mitsuakira also wanted to use the Tōshō-gū as a symbol of his authority to citizen of the territory.

Hiroshima was bombed by an atomic bomb on August 6, 1945. Tōshō-gū was located about 2.2 kilometers from the hypocenter of the blast. The blast blew off the roof tiles and ceiling, and the building tilted to the north. The stone torii gate was blown away. The heat from the blast started a fire in the Haiden (Worship hall), and the fire spread to Heiden (Offertory hall), Honden (Sanctuary) and the Shinme-sha (Horse stable). In addition, the Karamon gate, Yokurō corridor, Chōzuya (water basin), Honji-dō Hall, and Gokyō-syo hall were damaged, but they did not burn down. Those buildings have been around since 1648, were repaired and designated as Hiroshima City Cultural Properties. The burnt-down buildings were reconstructed in 1965.

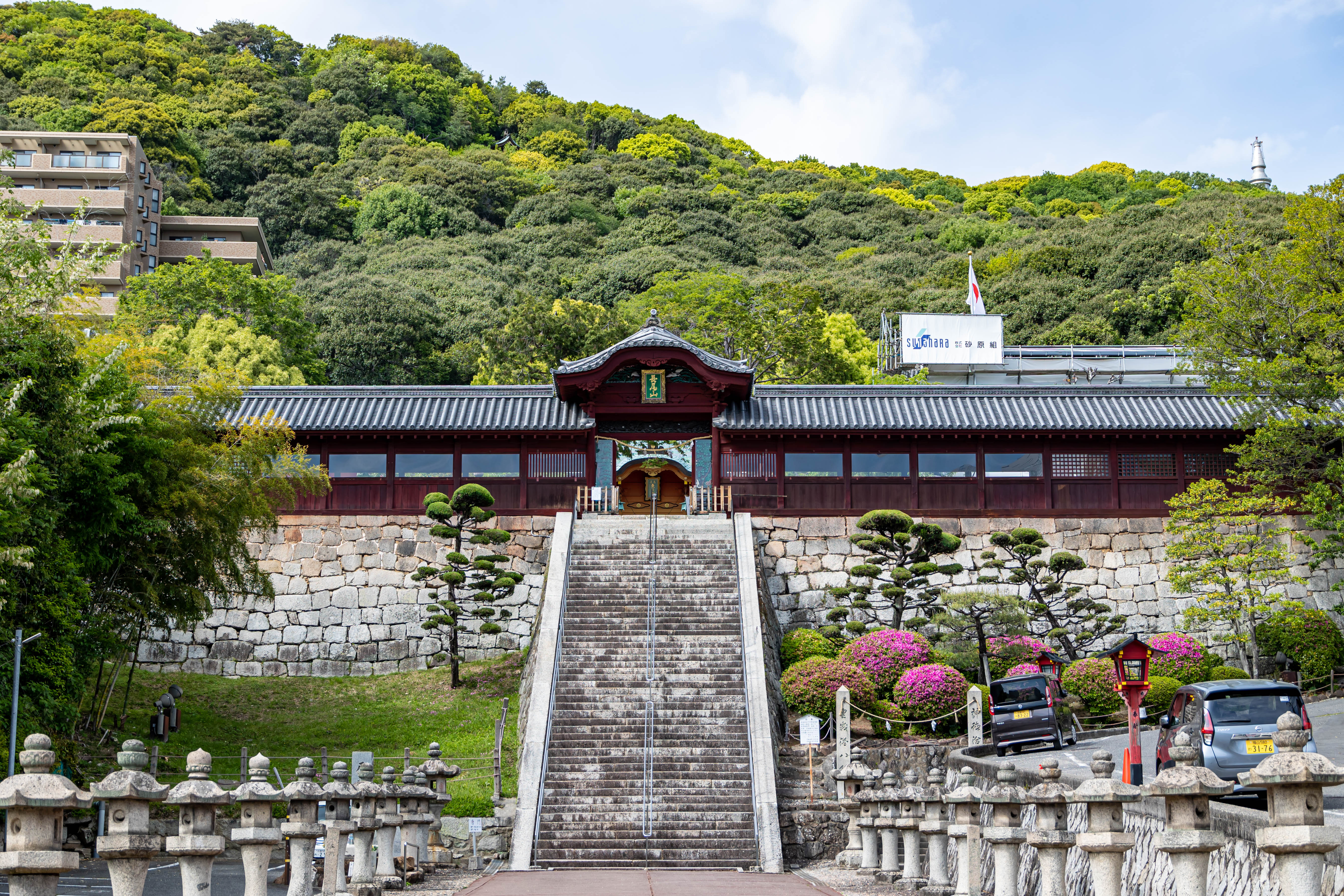
Karamon gate and Yokurō corridor

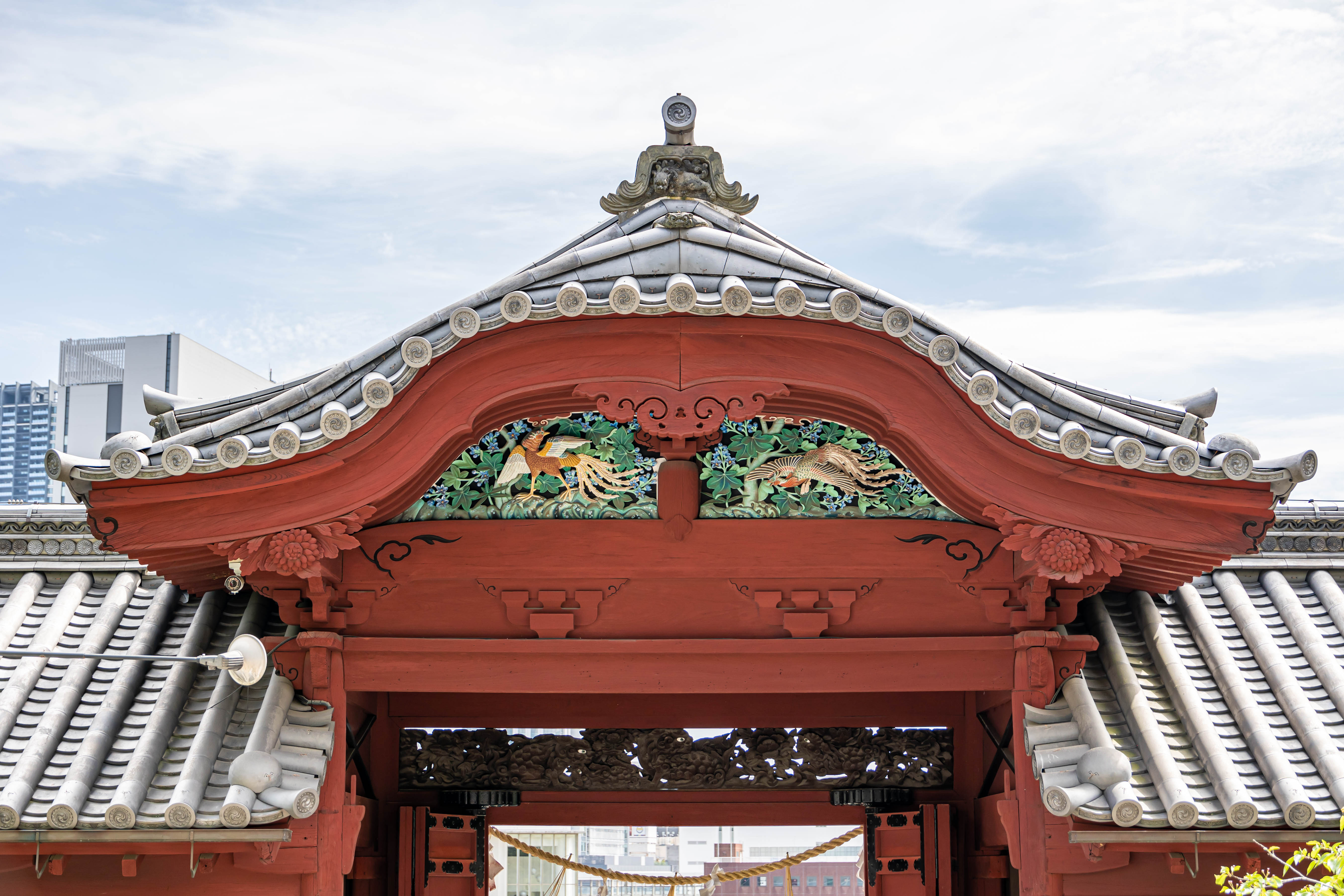
Karamon Gate

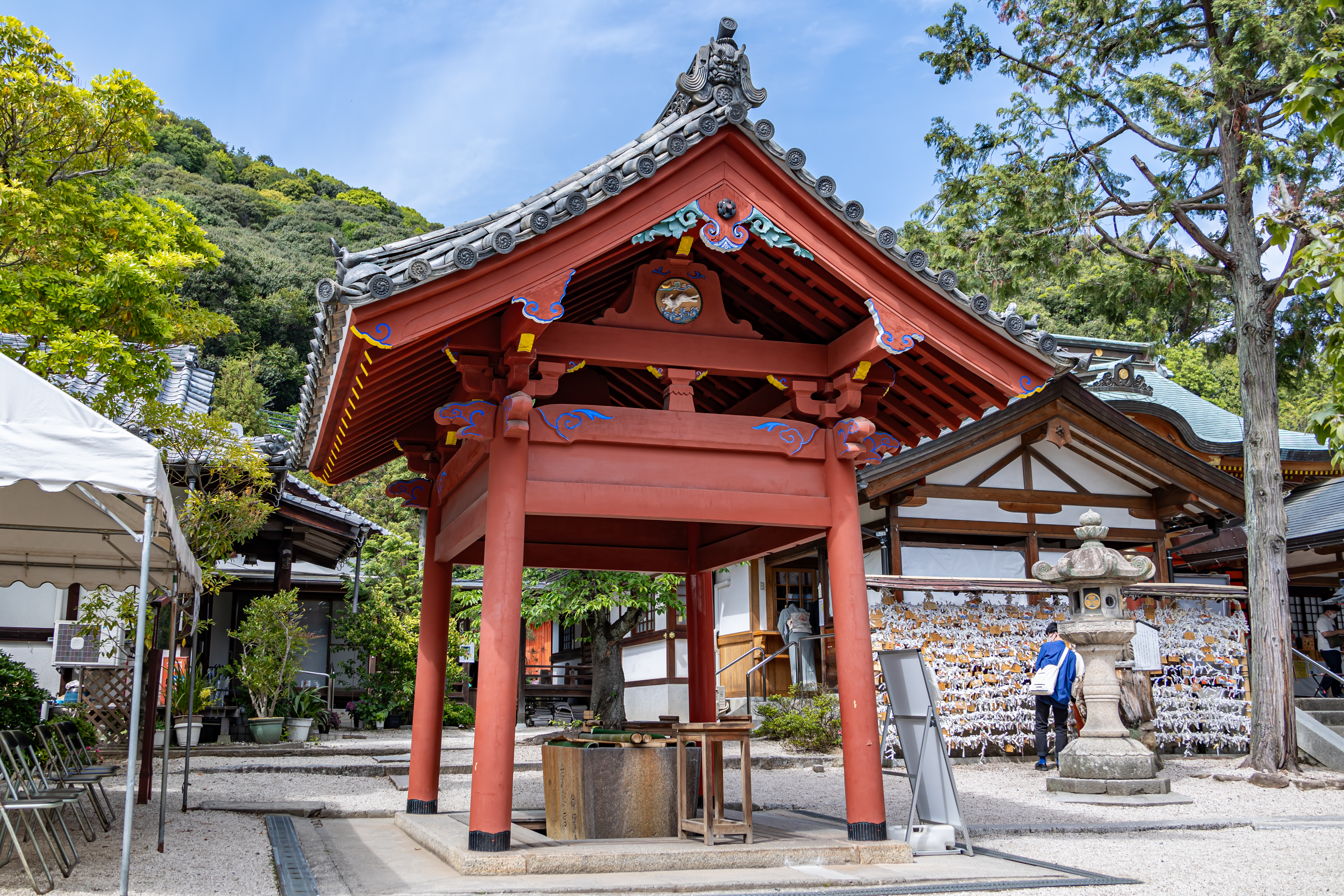
Chōzuya

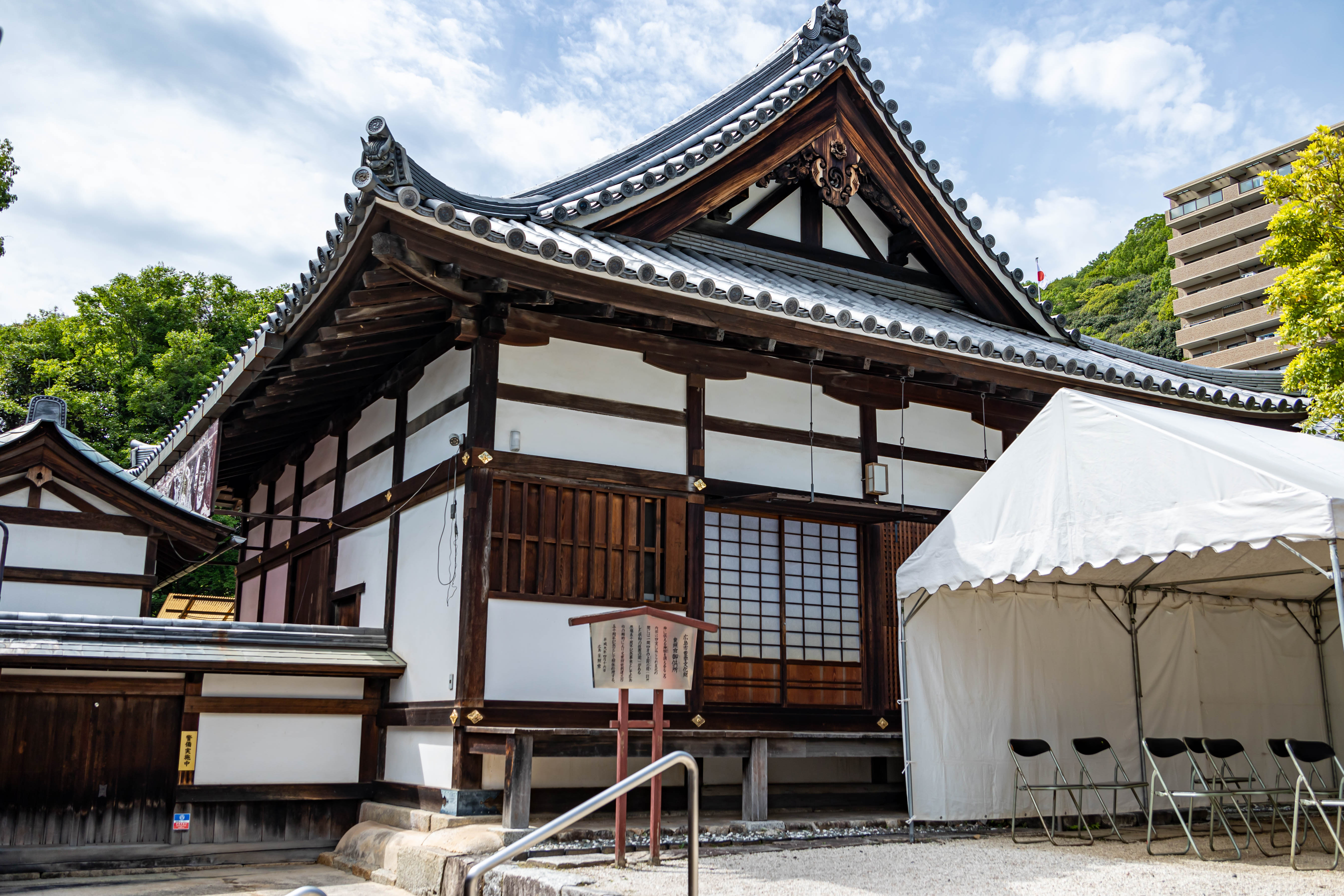
Honji-dō Hall
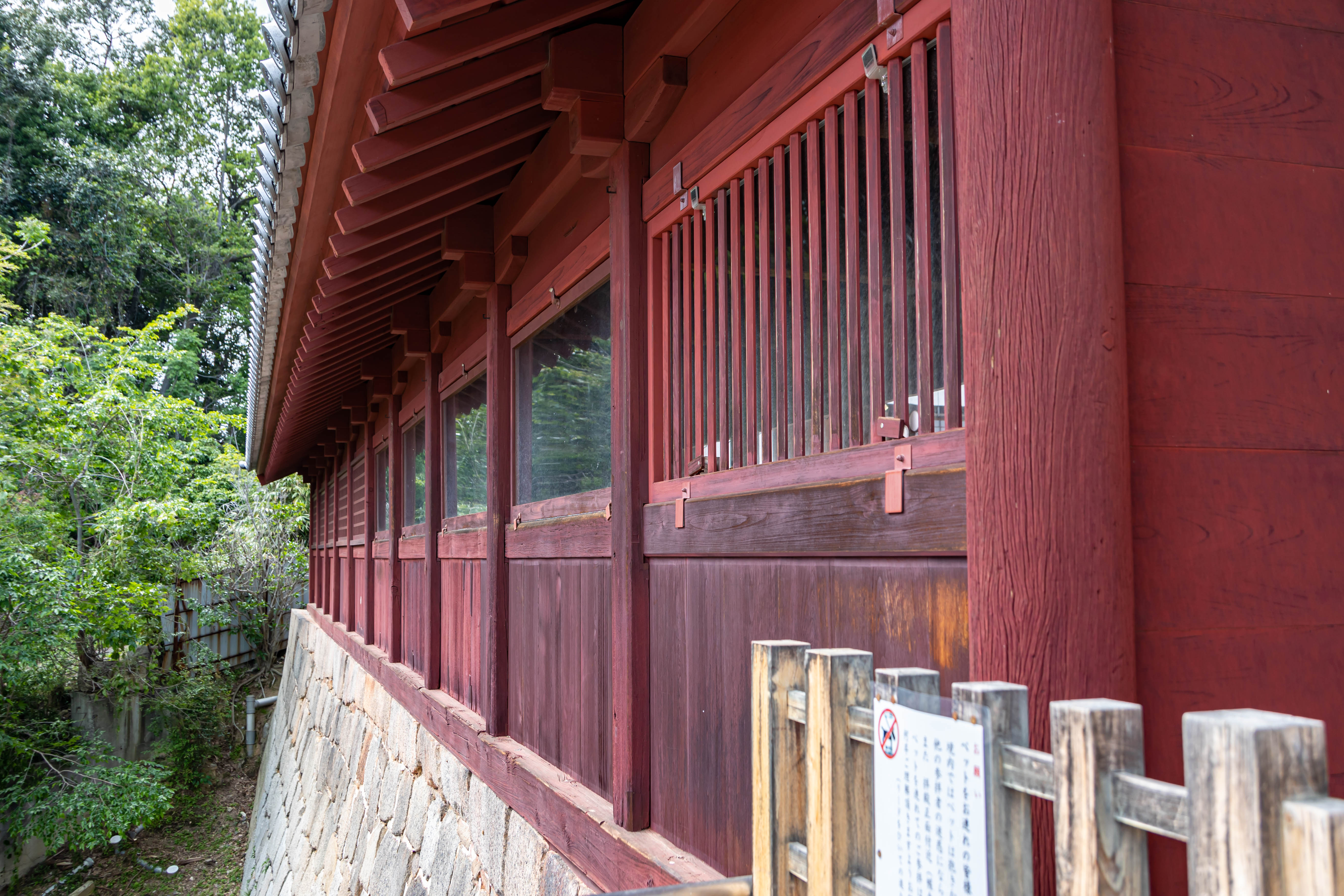
left side Yokurō corridor

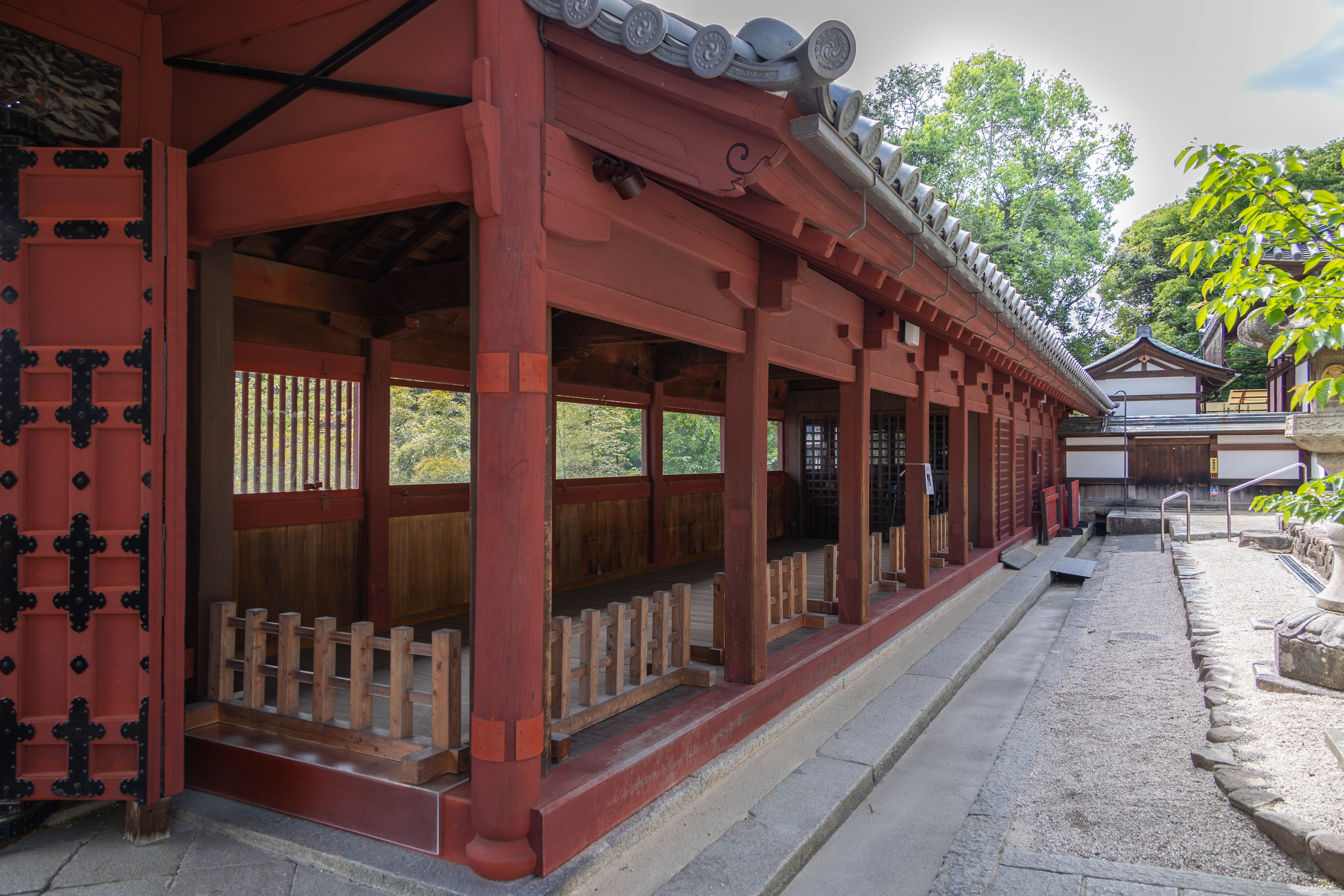
left side Yokurō corridor

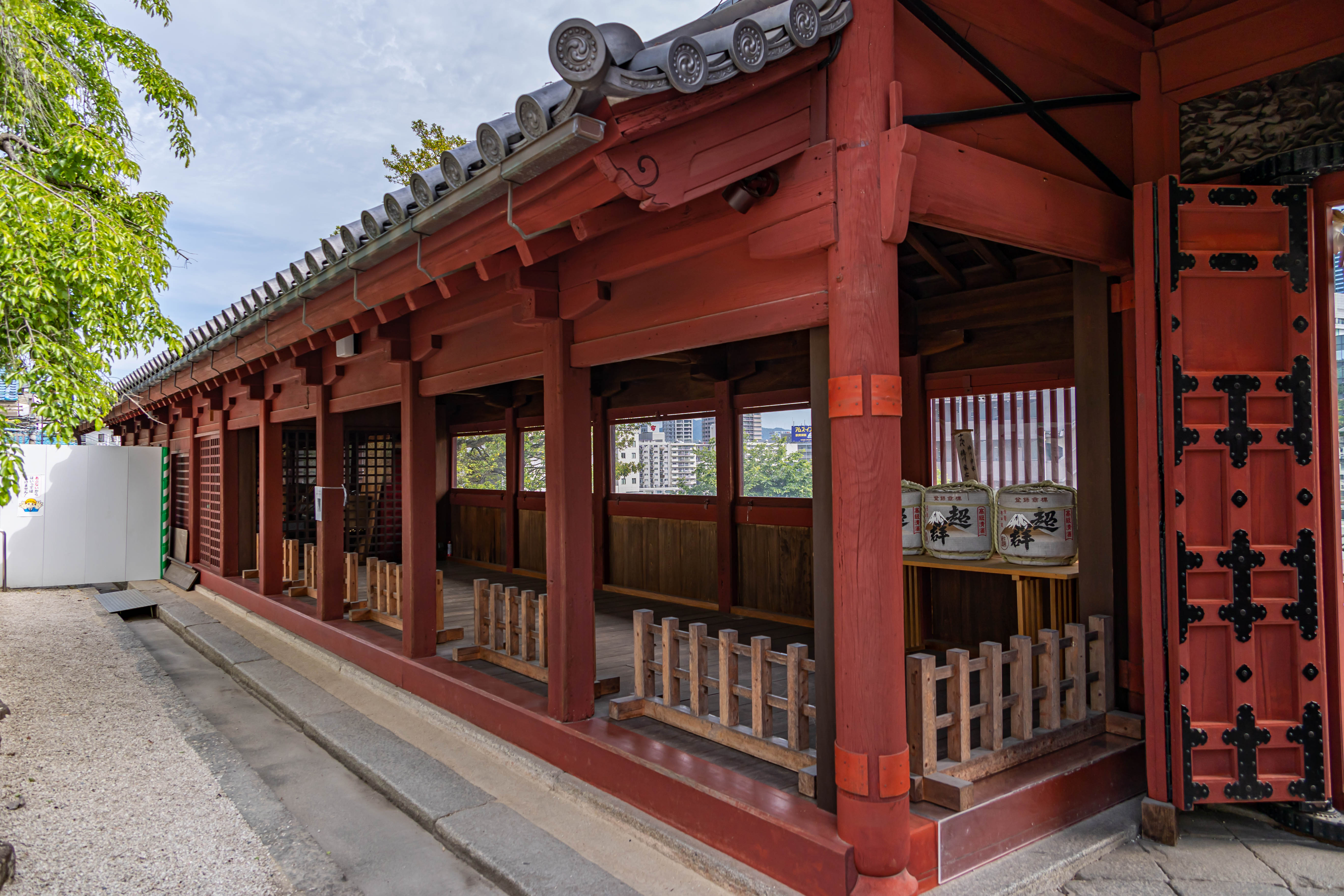
right side Yokurō corridor

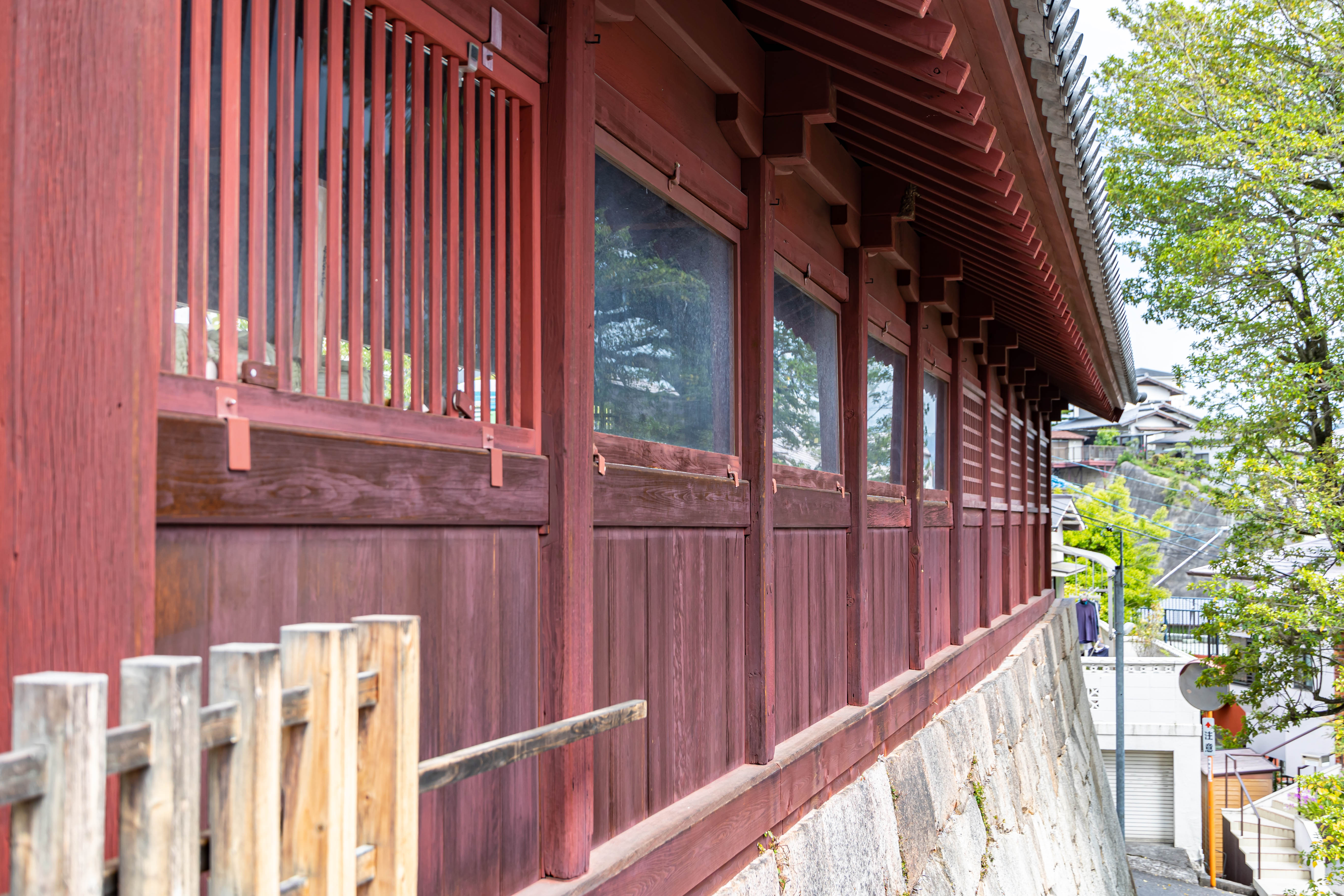
right side Yokurō corridor

== See also ==
- Tōshō-gū
- List of Tōshō-gū
