= Asano Yoshinaga (Lord of Hiroshima) =

Asano Yoshinaga (July 1, 1681 – January 13, 1752) was a Japanese daimyō of the Edo period, who ruled the Hiroshima Domain.

== Family ==
- Father: Asano Tsunanaga
- Mother: Tokugawa Atehime (1666–1683), daughter of Tokugawa Mitsutomo, 2nd Daimyo of Owari Domain
- Wife: Maeda Ushihime, daughter of Maeda Tsunanori, 4th Daimyo of Kaga Domain
- Children:
  - Asano Munetsune by Ushihime
  - Chohime married Sakai Tadayori of Tsuruoka Domain by Ushihime
  - daughter married Matsudaira Masamoto later married Soma Noritane of Sōma Domain
  - daughter married Matsudaira Sadateru of Takada Domain later married Abe Masanao

Preceded by Asano Tsunanaga	5th (Asano) Daimyō of Hiroshima; 1708–1752	Succeeded by Asano Munetsune
