= Asano Nagayuki =

Japanese politician

Marquess Asano Nagayuki
- 浅野 長之
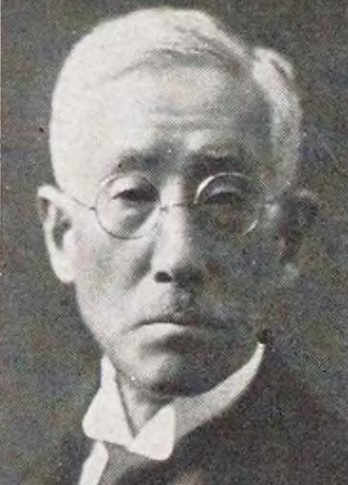

Member of the House of Peers
- In office 1 March 1937 – 20 December 1940 Hereditary peerage

Personal details
- Born: 27 June 1864
- Died: 23 April 1947 (aged 82)
- Children: Asano Nagatake
- Parents: Asano Nagaatsu (father); Asano Nagakoto (adoptive father)
- Education: Royal College of Science; Tokyo Imperial University

Asano Nagayuki (27 June 1864 – 23 April 1947) was the 28th family head of the Asano clan, which ruled over Hiroshima Domain before 1871.

He was cousin of the last feudal lord (daimyō) of Hiroshima Domain Asano Nagakoto, and succeeded him as head of the Asano family upon his death in 1937.

== Family ==
- Father: Asano Nagaatsu (1843–1873)
- Adoptive Father: Asano Nagakoto
- Wives:
  - Matsudaira Akiko, daughter of Matsudaira Sadayasu of Matsue Domain
  - Ōkōchi Kyoko, daughter of Ōkōchi Teruna of Takasaki Domain
- Children:
  - Asano Nagatake
  - Ōkōchi Terunobu by Kyoko
  - Asano Teruatsu

== See also ==
- Kazoku

| Preceded by Asano Nagakoto | 28th family head of the Asano clan of Hiroshima; 1937–1940 | Succeeded by Asano Nagatake |
