= Asano Munetsune =

- 浅野 宗恒
- Born: November 27, 1717
- Died: January 2, 1788 (aged 70)
- Spouse: Maeda Kiyohime
- Children: Asano Shigeakira (son); Mizuno Tadakane (son); Asano Nagakazu (son); Asano Nagatsumi (son); Daughter married to Matsudaira Sadakatsu
- Relatives: Asano Yoshinaga (father); Maeda Ushihime (mother); Izumi no Kata (concubine)
- Military career
- Allegiance: Hiroshima Domain
- Service years: 1752–1763
- Rank: Daimyō

Asano Munetsune (September 27, 1717 – January 2, 1788) was a Japanese daimyō of period, who ruled the Hiroshima Domain. His childhood name was Senjirō (仙次郎) later Iwamatsu (岩松).

== Family ==
- Father: Asano Yoshinaga (Lord of Hiroshima)
- Mother: Maeda Ushihime, daughter of Maeda Tsunanori, 4th Daimyo of Kaga Domain
- Wife: Maeda Kiyohime, daughter of Maeda Yoshinori, 5th Daimyo of Kaga Domain
- Concubine: Izumi no Kata
- Children:
  - Asano Shigeakira by Izumi no Kata
  - Mizuno Tadakane (1744–1818) of Karatsu Domain
  - Asano Nagakazu (1745–1808)
  - Asano Nagatsumi
  - daughter married Matsudaira Sadakatsu of Iyo-Matsuyama Domain later married Matsudaira Suketsugu of Miyazu Domain

| Preceded by Asano Yoshinaga | 6th (Asano) Daimyō of Hiroshima; 1752–1763 | Succeeded by Asano Shigeakira |
