= Asano Yoshiteru =

Japanese daimyō

- Born: Asano Yoshiteru; December 19, 1836
- Died: October 16, 1858 (aged 21)
- Spouse: Tokugawa Toshihime
- Father: Asano Naritaka

Asano Yoshiteru (浅野 慶熾; December 19, 1836 – October 16, 1858) was a Japanese daimyō of the Edo period, who ruled Hiroshima Domain. His childhood name was Sadakichi (定吉) later become Sadanosuke (定之丞) later become Zenjirō (善次郎).

== Family ==
- Father: Asano Naritaka
- Wife: Tokugawa Toshihime, daughter of Tokugawa Naritaka, 12th Daimyo of Owari Domain (and son of the 11th shōgun Tokugawa Ienari)

He was succeeded by his cousin Asano Nagamichi (1812-1872), grandson of Asano Shigeakira (1743-1814), 7th Daimyo of Hiroshima Domain.

Preceded by Asano Naritaka	10th (Asano) Daimyō of Hiroshima; 1858	Succeeded by Asano Nagamichi
