= Asano Tsunaakira =

Japanese daimyō

3rd (Asano) Daimyō of Hiroshima
- In office 1672–1673
- Preceded by: Asano Mitsuakira
- Succeeded by: Asano Tsunanaga

Personal details
- Born: June 21, 1637
- Died: February 18, 1673 (aged 35)
- Spouses: Kujō Aiko; Kujō Yasuko

Asano Tsunaakira (浅野 綱晟; June 21, 1637 – February 18, 1673) was a Japanese daimyō of the Edo period, who ruled the Hiroshima Domain.

Two of his consorts were daughters of the court noble and regent Kujō Michifusa. His childhood name was Iwamatsu (岩松).

== Family ==
- Father: Asano Mitsuakira
- Mother: Maeda Manhime (1618–1700), daughter of Maeda Toshitsune, 2nd Daimyo of Kaga Domain, and Tokugawa Tamahime (daughter of the 2nd shōgun Tokugawa Hidetada and Asai Oeyo)
- Wives:
  - Kujō Aiko (d. 1659), second daughter of the regent Kujō Michifusa (son of the regent Kujō Yukiie and Toyotomi Sadako), and Matsudaira Tsuruhime (daughter of Matsudaira Tadanao, 2nd Daimyo of Fukui Domain and Tokugawa Katsuhime, daughter of the 2nd shōgun Tokugawa Hidetada and Asai Oeyo))
  - Kujō Yasuko (d. 1679), fifth daughter of Kujō Michifusa and Matsudaira Tsuruhime
- Children:
  - Asano Tsunanaga by Aiko
  - Asano Nagazumi (1671–1718) by Yasuko
  - daughter married Honda Tadatsune of Koriyama Domain

Preceded by Asano Mitsuakira	3rd (Asano) Daimyō of Hiroshima; 1672–1673	Succeeded by Asano Tsunanaga
