= Asano Yoshinaga =

Japanese samurai

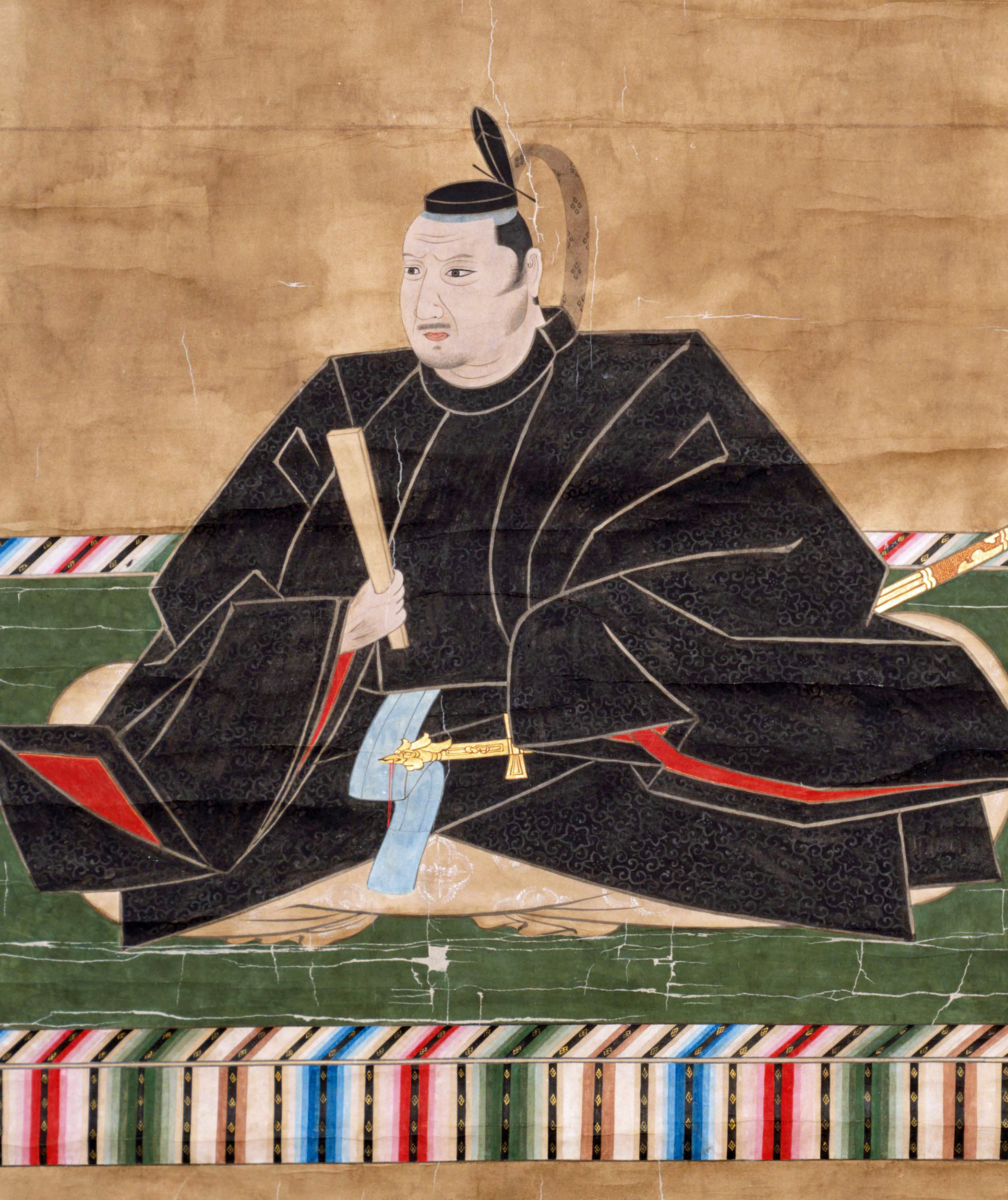
Asano Yoshinaga

Asano Yoshinaga (浅野 幸長; 1576 – October 9, 1613) was a Japanese samurai and feudal lord of the late Sengoku and early Edo periods. His father served as one of the Go-Bugyō in the late Azuchi–Momoyama period.

Asano Yoshinaga was born in Sakamoto, in the Asai district of Ōmi Province, in 1576. He was the eldest son of Asano Nagamasa.

He married a daughter of Ikeda Tsuneoki.

In April 1589, he was appointed to the rank of Junior Fifth Rank and the title of Saikyo-no-Daibu.

In 1590, Yoshinaga was involved in the Siege of Odawara. This was his first battle, and he was 15 years old at the time. In May, he participated in the siege of Iwatsuki Castle, and on the 20th, he and Honda Tadamasa broke through the main gate and fought fiercely. Hideyoshi highly praised his military achievements, and sent Takigawa Tadamasa to present him with a Noshitsuki katana and a wakizashi.

During the Imjin War in 1592 , he was stationed at Nagoya Castle in Hizen.

In 1593, together with his father, he was granted Fuchu, in Kai Province. Though the Asano family was to be sent to Noto Province as a result of their implication in the alleged treason of Toyotomi Hidetsugu, the good offices of Maeda Toshiie kept them in Kai Province.

In 1595, following the conclusion of a peace treaty between Japan and Ming dynasty, he returned to Japan.

In 1597, when the Imjin War broke out again, Yoshinaga crossed the sea and set up camp at Nishinoura.

== Conflict with Ishida Mitsunari ==
According to popular theory In 1598 after the death of Toyotomi Hideyoshi, the government of Japan had an accident when seven military generals consisted of Fukushima Masanori, Katō Kiyomasa, Ikeda Terumasa, Hosokawa Tadaoki, Asano Yoshinaga, Katō Yoshiaki, Kuroda Nagamasa, Hachisuka Iemasa, Tōdō Takatora, and Kuroda Yoshitaka brought their troops and entourage to storm Ishida's residence to confront Mitsunari.

It was said that the reason of this conspiracy was a dissatisfaction of those generals towards Mitsunari, as he wrote bad assessments and underreported the achievements of those generals during the Imjin war against the Korea & Chinese empire. At first, these generals gathered at Kiyomasa's mansion in Osaka Castle, and from there they moved into Mitsunari's mansion. However, Mitsunari learned of this through a report from a servant of Toyotomi Hideyori named Jiemon Kuwajima, and fled to Satake Yoshinobu's mansion together with Shima Sakon to hide. When they found out that Mitsunari was not in the mansion, they searched the mansions of various feudal lords in Osaka Castle, and Kato's army also approached the Satake residence. Therefore, Mitsunari and his party escaped from the Satake residence and barricaded themselves at the Fushimi Castle. The next day, the seven generals surrounded Fushimi Castle with their soldiers as they knew Mitsunari was hiding there. Tokugawa Ieyasu, who was in charge of political affairs in Fushimi Castle tried to arbitrate the situation. The seven generals requested Ieyasu to hand over Mitsunari, which was refused by Ieyasu. Ieyasu then negotiated to let Mitsunari retire and to review the assessment of the Battle of Ulsan Castle in Korea which became the major source of this incident. He later told his second son, Yūki Hideyasu, to escort Mitsunari to Sawayama Castle. However, historian Watanabe Daimon stated from the primary and secondary sources about the accident that this was more of legal conflict between those generals rather than conspiracy to murder him. The role of Ieyasu here was not to physically protect Mitsunari, but to mediate the complaints of those generals.

Nevertheless, historians viewed this incident not just simply personal problems between those seven generals and Mitsunari, but rather as an extension of the political rivalries between the Tokugawa faction and the anti-Tokugawa faction led by Mitsunari. Since this incident, military figures who didn't like Mitsunari would later support Ieyasu during the conflict of Sekigahara between the Eastern army led by Tokugawa Ieyasu and the Western army led by Ishida Mitsunari. Muramatsu Shunkichi, writer of "The Surprising Colors and Desires of the Heroes of Japanese History and violent women”, gave his assessment that the reason of Mitsunari failure in his war against Ieyasu was due to his unpopularity among the major political figures of that time.

Though the Asano clan was secure following its service under Tokugawa Ieyasu at the Battle of Sekigahara, it would be moved to Wakayama Domain, in Kii Province. The clan would again be moved, to Hiroshima Domain, in the early 17th century.

== Personal life ==
Yoshinaga's three-dimensional battle standard, a gold-plated basketlike object, was well known during the Korean campaign.

His daughters, Hanahime married Matsudaira Tadamasa of Fukui Domain and Haruhime (Haruhime was his daughter with Ikeda Tsuneoki's daughter) married Tokugawa Yoshinao of Owari Domain.

He studied gunnery expert under the tutelage of Inadome Sukenao and was known as the "best in the world" with his firearms.

== Bibliography ==
- Berry, Mary Elizabeth. Hideyoshi. Cambridge: Harvard University Press, 1982.
- Turnbull, Stephen. The Samurai Sourcebook. Sterling: New Edition, 2000.
- Turnbull, Stephen. Samurai Invasion. London: Cassell & Co., 2002.
- Hotta Masayoshi (1923). "Asano clan". 寛政重脩諸家譜. 第2輯 [Kansei Chushū Sho Kafu. Part 2] (in Japanese). 國民圖書. pp. 697–699. ndldm:1082719/358.
- Genealogy of the lords of Wakayama, including the Asano (in Japanese)
- Genealogy of the Asano after their move to Hiroshima (in Japanese)
- Biographies of various Azuchi-Momoyama generals, including Asano Yoshinaga
