= Asano Nagakoto =

Japanese politician

Marquess Asano Nagakoto
- 浅野 長勲
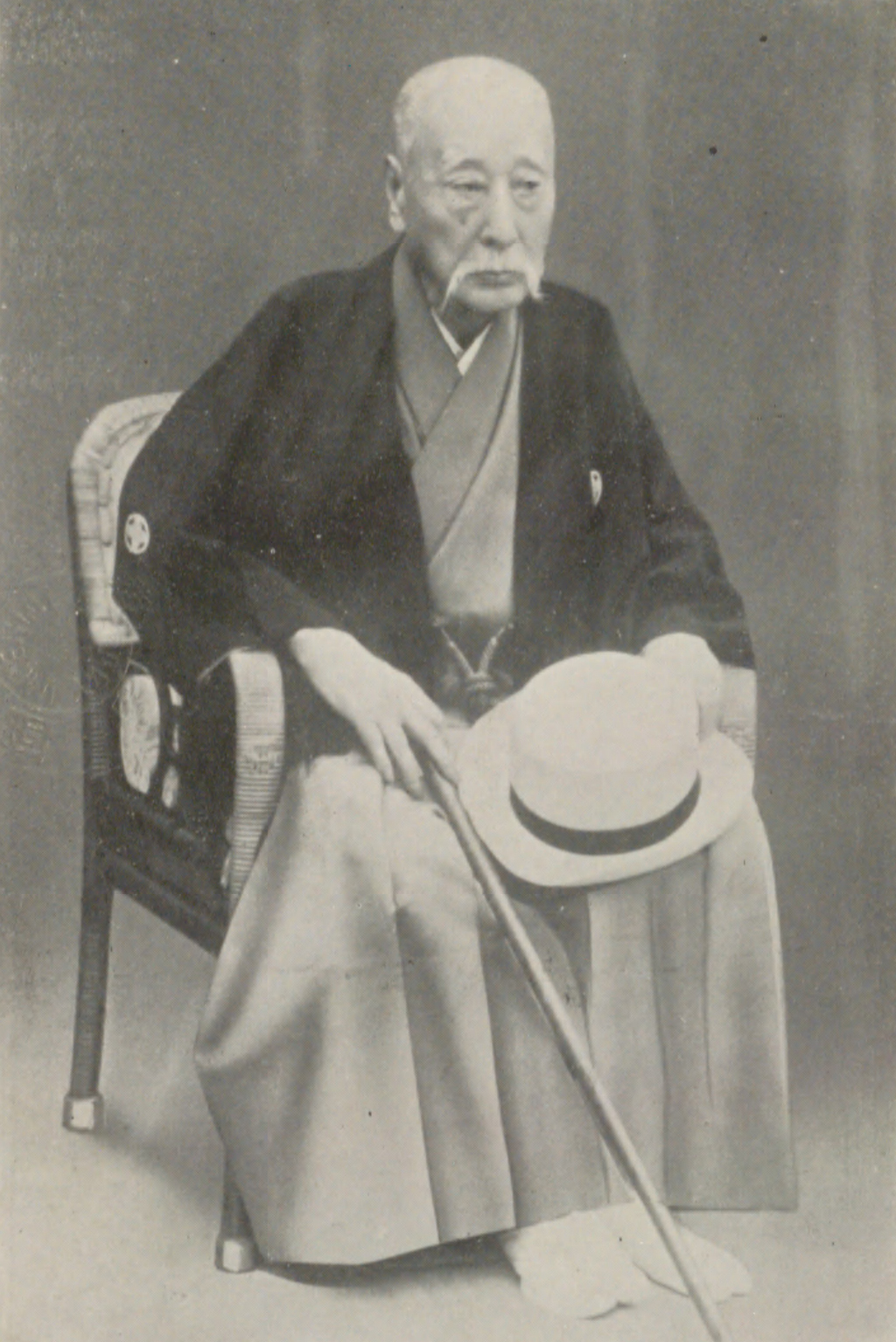

Member of the House of Peers
- In office February 1890 – 1 February 1937 Hereditary peerage

Member of the Genrōin
- In office 27 December 1880 – 20 March 1882

Daimyō of Hiroshima Domain
- In office 17 June 1869 – 14 July 1871
- Preceded by: Asano Nagamichi
- Succeeded by: Position abolished

Personal details
- Born: 28 August 1842 Hiroshima, Aki, Japan
- Died: 1 February 1937 (aged 94) Kamikawa, Hiroshima, Japan
- Spouse: Yamanouchi Tsunahime

Marquess Asano Nagakoto (浅野 長勲; 28 August 1842 – 1 February 1937) was a daimyō of Hiroshima Domain for a short time after the Meiji Restoration. For the rest of the Meiji period, he was a politician and diplomat, and was one of the last surviving Japanese daimyō (Hayashi Tadataka and Wakebe Mitsunori outlived him).

== Biography ==
Adopted by his uncle Asano Nagamichi, he served as assistant to his adoptive father through the 1860s, and attended many of the meetings and events surrounding the restoration of Imperial rule, and as such was one of many who advised the shōgun Tokugawa Yoshinobu to return power to the Emperor of Japan. Unlike many from domains such as Satsuma and Chōshū, however, Asano was opposed to taking military action against the shogunate. His childhood name was Kiyotsuchi (喜代槌) later Tamegoro (為五郎).

Nagakoto became the twelfth daimyō of Hiroshima in 1869 upon Nagamichi's retirement. The domains (han) were abolished in 1871, but Asano was granted the title of Marquis (kōshaku) under the kazoku system of peerage which was instituted at that time.

He became a member of the Genrōin (Chamber of Elders) in 1880, was appointed ambassador to Italy two years later, and served in the House of Peers for a time as well. Though living and serving in Tokyo, he worked to support industry and other enterprises in his home area, newly dubbed Hiroshima Prefecture.

The Asano Library (now the Hiroshima Central City Library) opened in 1926, and Asano died in 1937 at the age of 94.

== Family ==
- Father: Asano Tsutomo
- Mother: daughter of Sawa Yoshimoto
- Adoptive Father: Asano Nagamichi
- Wife: Yamanouchi Tsunahime, daughter of Yamanouchi Toyoteru, 13th Daimyo of Tosa Domain
- Adopted Children:
  - Asano Nagamichi
  - Asano Nagaatsu (1843–1873)
  - Mashiko married Matsura Atsushi
  - Asano Nagayuki, his cousin (son of his uncle Asano Toshitsugu)

Preceded by Asano Nagamichi	12th and last (Asano) Daimyō of Hiroshima; 1869–1871	Succeeded by none, as Hiroshima domain was transformed into a modern Prefecture
Preceded by Asano Nagamichi	27th family head of the Asano clan of Hiroshima; 1869–1871	Succeeded by Asano Nagayuki
