= Asano Tsunanaga =

Japanese daimyō

Lord of Hiroshima
- In office 1673–1708
- Preceded by: Asano Tsunaakira
- Succeeded by: Asano Yoshinaga

Personal details
- Born: July 28, 1659
- Died: April 1, 1708 (aged 48)
- Spouse: Atehime

Asano Tsunanaga (浅野 綱長; July 28, 1659 – April 1, 1708) was a Japanese daimyō of the Edo period, who ruled the Hiroshima Domain. He was the chamberlain of Aki and held the title of Aki no kami. His childhood name was Iwamatsu (岩松).

During the 47 rōnin incident, Tsunanaga sent a messenger to Akō, which was ruled by a branch family of the Hiroshima Asano, and recommended that Ōishi Kuranosuke peacefully surrender the castle to the shogunate's envoys.

His daughter married the court noble Ichijō Kaneka.

== Family ==
- Father: Asano Tsunaakira
- Mother: Kujō Aiko (d. 1659), daughter of the regent Kujō Michifusa (son of the regent Kujō Yukiie and Toyotomi Sadako), and Matsudaira Tsuruhime (daughter of Matsudaira Tadanao, 2nd Daimyo of Fukui Domain and Tokugawa Katsuhime, daughter of the 2nd shōgun Tokugawa Hidetada and Asai Oeyo))
- Wife: Tokugawa Atehime (1666–1683), daughter of Tokugawa Mitsutomo, 2nd Daimyo of Owari Domain
- Children:
  - Asano Yoshinaga by Atehime
  - Asano Nagakata (1693–1744)
  - Nakagawa Hisayoshi (1708–1743)
  - Umehime married Ogasawara Tadamoto of Kokura Domain
  - daughter married Kujō Morotaka
  - daughter married the regent Ichijō Kaneka
  - daughter married Matsudaira Sukekuni of Hamamatsu Domain
  - daughter married Matsudaira Yoshikata of Mutsu-Yanagawa Domain
  - daughter married Mizuno Tadamoto of Matsumoto Domain later married Mori Naganari of Akō Domain later married Kawaha Tadateru

Preceded by Asano Tsunaakira	4th (Asano) Daimyō of Hiroshima; 1673–1708	Succeeded by Asano Yoshinaga
