= Asano Naritaka =

- 浅野 斉粛
- Born: November 7, 1817
- Died: February 5, 1868 (aged 50)
- Spouse: Tokugawa Suehime
- Children: Asano Yoshiteru (son); Yakuhime (daughter)
- Relatives: Asano Narikata (father)
- Military career
- Allegiance: Hiroshima Domain
- Service years: 1831–1858
- Rank: Daimyō

Asano Naritaka (November 7, 1817 – February 5, 1868) was a Japanese daimyō of the Edo period, who ruled Hiroshima Domain. His childhood name was Katsukichi (勝吉) later Nagataka (長粛).

== Family ==
- Father: Asano Narikata
- Wife: Tokugawa Suehime (1817–1872), daughter of the 11th shōgun Tokugawa Ienari
- Children:
  - Asano Yoshiteru
  - Yakuhime (1843–1843) by Suehime

Preceded by Asano Narikata	9th (Asano) Daimyō of Hiroshima; 1831–1858	Succeeded by Asano Yoshiteru
