= Asano Nagamichi =

Japanese daimyō

Asano Nagamichi (浅野 長訓; September 9, 1812 – August 29, 1872) was a Japanese daimyō of the Edo period, who ruled Hiroshima Domain. His childhood name was Sennosuke (千之助), later Tamegorō (為五郎).

== Family ==
- Father: Asano Nagatomo
- Wife: Shunhime, daughter of Asano Nagakane
- Adopted Sons:
  - Asano Nagakoto
  - Asano Yukitoshi (1861–1936)

He was succeeded by his nephew Asano Nagakoto (1842–1937), son of his brother Asano Toshiteru.

Preceded by Asano Yoshiteru	11th (Asano) Daimyō of Hiroshima; 1858–1869	Succeeded by Asano Nagakoto
