= Asano Narikata =

Asano Narikata (November 5, 1773 – January 4, 1831) was a Japanese daimyō of the Edo period, who ruled the Hiroshima Domain. His childhood name was Jinnosuke (時之丞) later Zenjirō (善次郎).

== Family ==
- Father: Asano Shigeakira
- Mother: Tokugawa Yokohime (1751–1773), daughter of Tokugawa Munekatsu, 8th Daimyo of Owari Domain
- Wives:
  - Princess Arisugawa no Miya Oriko, daughter of Prince Arisugawa no Miya Orihito
  - Tokudaiji Yasuko, daughter of Tokudaiji Kanmichi
- Children:
  - Asano Naritaka
  - Utahime married Mizoguchi Naoaki of Shibata Domain
  - Teruhime married Matsudaira Naonobu of Kawagoe Domain later married Uesugi Narisada of Yonezawa Domain
  - Akihime married Hosokawa Narimori of Kumamoto Domain
  - Kumihime married Maeda Toshiyasu of Toyama Domain
  - daughter married Akimoto Hisatomo of Yamagata Domain
  - Kayohime married Sō Yoshiyori of Tsushima-Fuchū Domain
  - daughter married Mizoguchi Naoryo
  - Kayoko married Tachibana Akinobu of Yanagawa Domain

== See also ==
- Hiroshima Domain

Preceded by Asano Shigeakira	8th (Asano) Daimyō of Hiroshima; 1799–1830	Succeeded by Asano Naritaka
