= Hiroshima Domain =

Former Japanese regional subdivision

Hiroshima Domain 広島藩 Hiroshima-han
- Domain of Japan
- 1601–1871
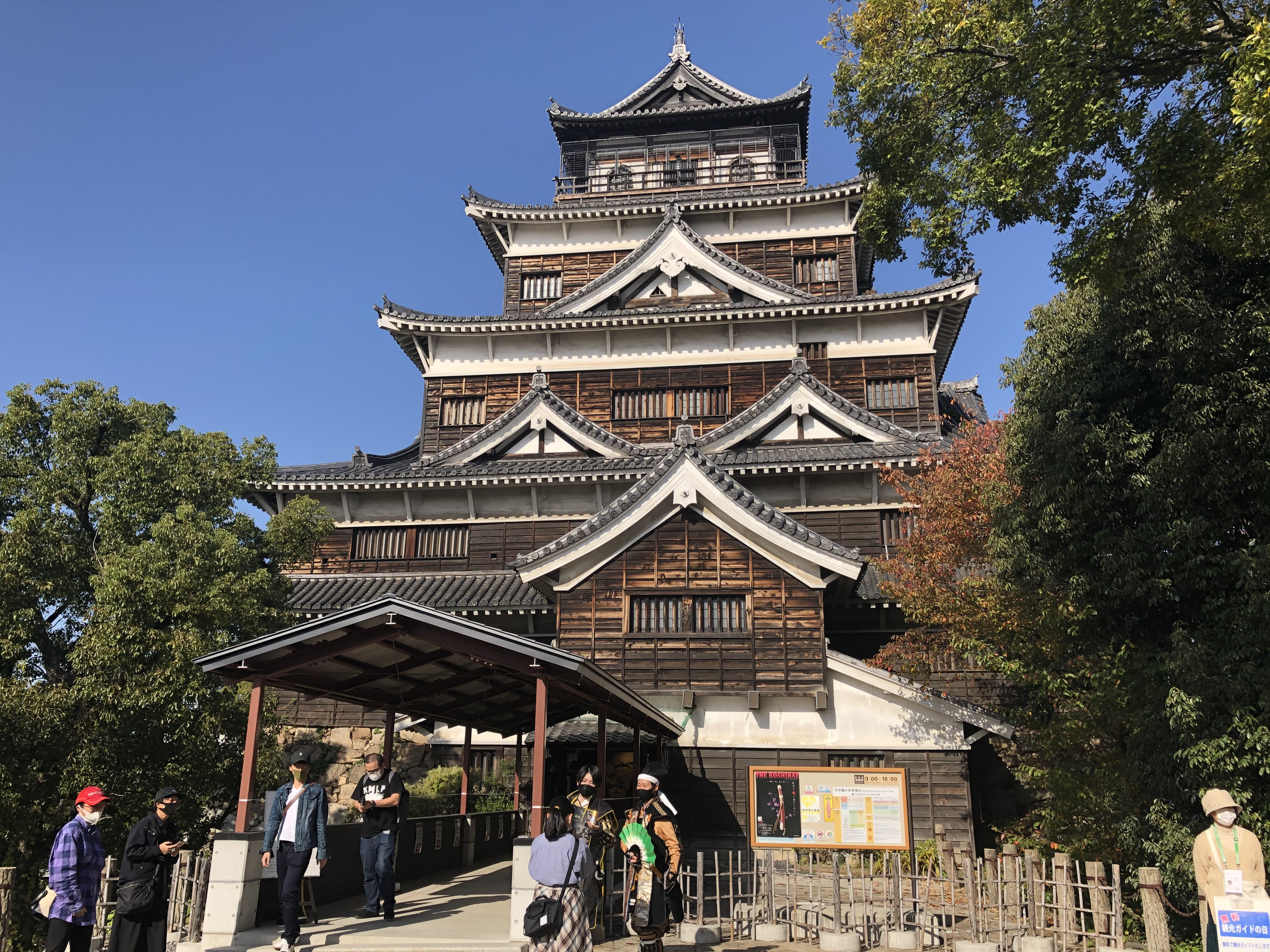
- View of Hirohima Castle

- Flag Mon of the Asano

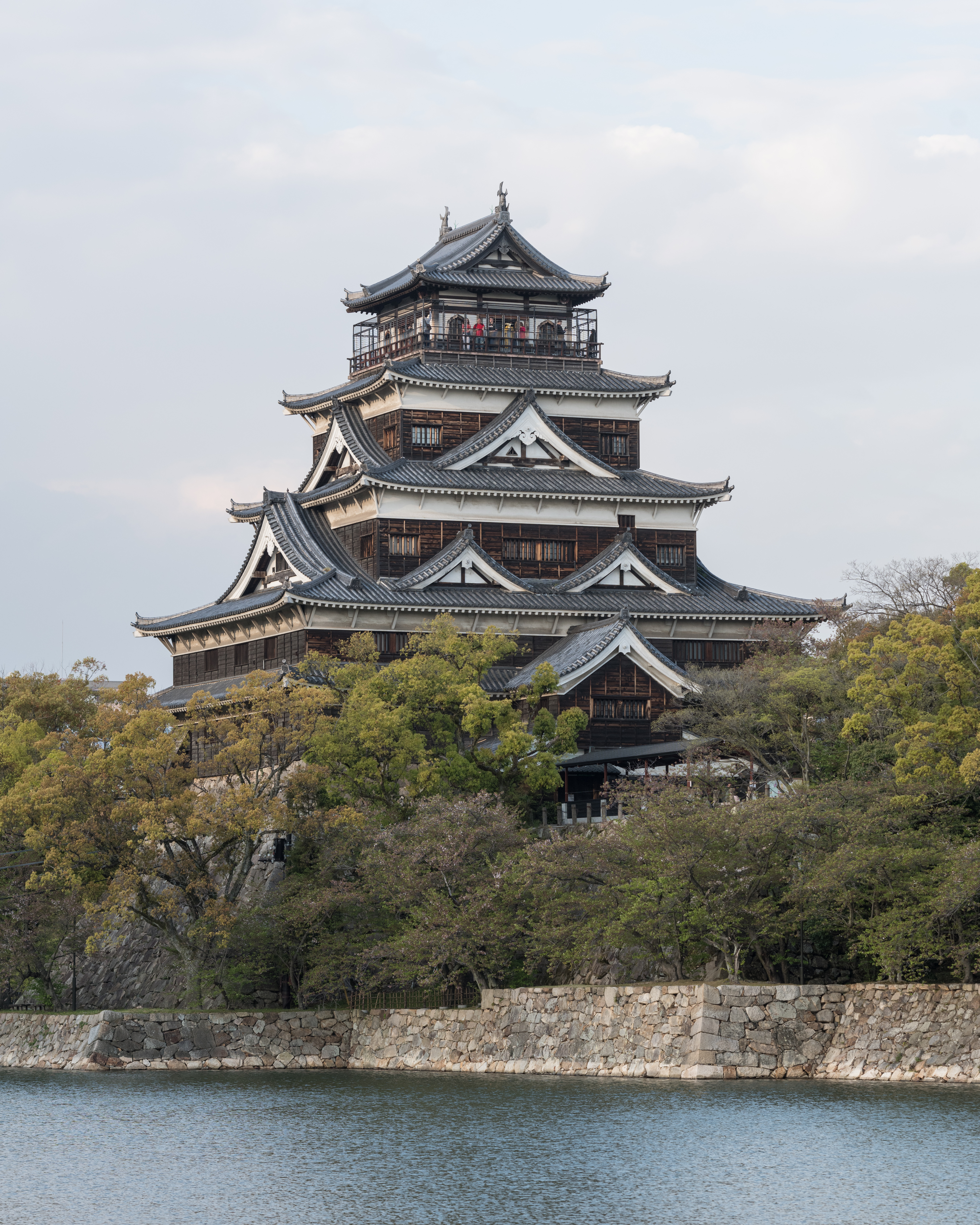
- Reconstructed Hiroshima Castle in Hiroshima
- Capital: Hiroshima Castle
- Area
  - Coordinates: 34°24′10″N 132°27′33″E
- Government
- Daimyō
  - 1591–1600: Mōri Terumoto (first)
  - 1869–1871: Asano Nagakoto (last)
- Historical era: Edo period
  - Established: 1601
  - Abolition of the han system: 1871
- Contained within
  - Province: Aki, Bingo
- Today part of: Hiroshima Prefecture

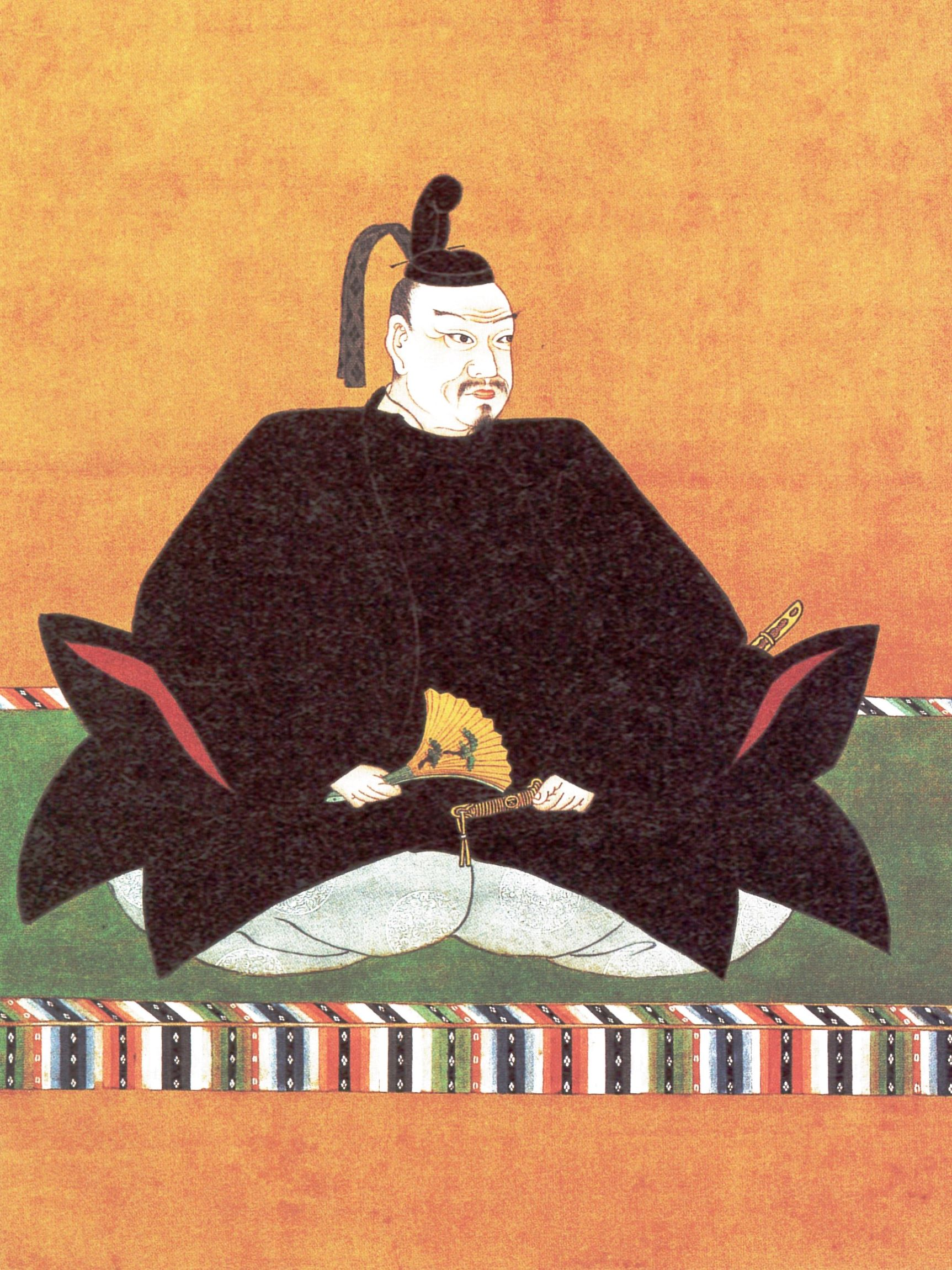
Mōri Terumoto founder of Hiroshima Domain

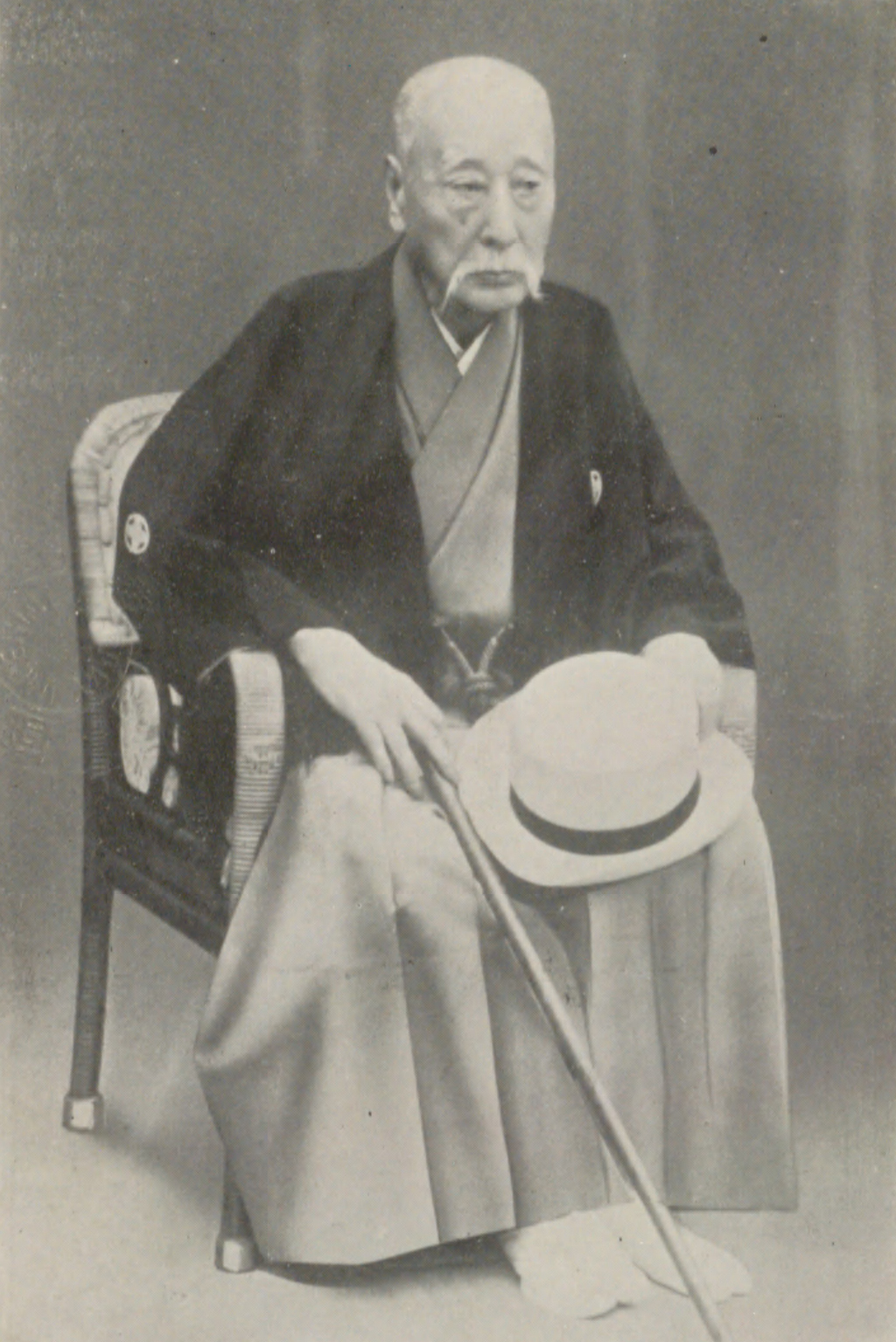
Asano Nagakoto, final daimyo of Hiroshima Domain

The Hiroshima Domain (広島藩, Hiroshima-han) was a large domain that owned all of Aki Province and half of Bingo Province. It occupies most of current Hiroshima Prefecture. The domain office was located at Hiroshima Castle in Sato District, Aki Province (renamed Numata District in 1664), Hiroshima (present-day Motomachi, Naka Ward, Hiroshima City, Hiroshima Prefecture). It is often called Geishu Domain (or Aki Domain).

The Hiroshima Domain was based at Hiroshima Castle in Aki Province, in the modern city of Hiroshima, located in the Chūgoku region of the island of Honshu. The Hiroshima Domain was ruled for most of its existence by the daimyō of the Asano clan and encompassed Aki Province and parts of Bingo Province with a Kokudaka system value of 426,500 koku. The Hiroshima Domain was dissolved in the abolition of the han system in 1871 by the Meiji government and its territory was absorbed into Hiroshima Prefecture.

== History ==
During the Kamakura period, Mori Tsunemitsu granted his fourth son, Mori Tokichika, Yoshidanosho in Aki Province. Tokichika's descendants remained in Echigo while ruling indirectly over the territory of Aki. However, during the Northern and Southern Courts period, Mori Tokichika's great-grandson Mori Motoharu moved to Aki and directly ruled over the territory at Koriyama Castle. The Mori clan grew in power and became a prominent feudal lord in Aki Province during the Muromachi period. In the Sengoku period, they defeated various clans, including the Takeda and Ouchi clans, and established their dominance over the Chugoku region. Hiroshima Castle was built in 1591 and became the Mori clan's residence, making Hiroshima the political and economic center. However, in the Battle of Sekigahara in 1600, Mori Terumoto, the clan's leader, was defeated, and their territory was significantly reduced.

Fukushima Masanori became the satrap of Aki and Bingo, succeeding the Mori clan. He re-evaluated the land and obtained a larger territory. Masanori implemented changes in the military and education systems, but compromises were made in Aki due to the influence of local feudal lords. The Sengoku period saw the development of castle towns and domestic industry in Hiroshima. However, in 1615, Aki Province was destroyed, Hiroshima Castle was demolished, and only Kannabe Castle remained in Bingo Province. The Mizuno family destroyed Hiroshima Castle and moved to Fukuyama Castle. Mihara Fortress had been abandoned, but the Fukushima family secretly relocated a turret from the destroyed Tomo Castle. In 1619, Masanori was found guilty of unauthorized renovations to Hiroshima Castle and his territory was significantly reduced. He was transferred to the Kawanakajima Domain.

In 1589, Hiroshima Castle was commissioned by Mōri Terumoto, head of the powerful Mōri clan and a member of Toyotomi Hideyoshi's Council of Five Elders. In 1591, Terumoto relocated to Hiroshima while it was still under construction, using it as his base to rule his domain covering most of the Chūgoku region. Following the Battle of Sekigahara in 1600, the Mōri were forced out of Hiroshima by Tokugawa Ieyasu and relocated their base to Hagi Castle, losing most of their eastern territories. The Hiroshima han (domain) was subsequently established with Fukushima Masanori as its daimyō (feudal lord), covering Aki Province and parts of neighboring Bingo Province. However, nineteen years later, Hiroshima Castle suffered extensive flood damage and Fukushima repaired it in violation of the Tokugawa shogunate's laws on the construction and repair of castles (see buke shohatto). The shogunate then ordered Fukushima to Kawanakajima Domain, and awarded Hiroshima to the Asano clan, who ruled it for the remainder of the Edo period. Under the Tokugawa Kokudaka system for domains the Hiroshima Domain was assessed at 426,500 koku, the sixth-largest domain in Japan, excepting those held by the Tokugawa-Matsudaira dynasty.

Asano Nagaaki, the second son of Asano Nagamasa, who served as Gobugyo under the Toyotomi administration, became the feudal lord of Aki and eight districts of Bingo from the Kishu Domain. Despite being smaller than the Fukushima territory, it gained approval from the shogunate with a detection level of 426,000 koku. Hiroshima benefited from excellent maritime transport through the Seto Inland Sea route with Osaka and established a monopoly on timber, iron, paper, and other goods from the early stages of its establishment. Additionally, it made significant profits by skillfully manipulating rice market prices and purchasing rice from other domains at low prices.

Chosei followed the policies of the Fukushima clan era while simultaneously adopting a strict approach towards local clans in order to modernize the governing structure. Mitsunori, the second lord of the domain and Nagaaki's second son, was the grandson of Tokugawa Ieyasu. With permission from the shogunate, Mitsunori distributed 50,000 koku to his illegitimate brother, Nagaharu Asano, establishing the Miyoshi domain as a branch domain. Mitsunori focused on improving the roads and was granted permission to use the surname Matsudaira.

The third lord of the domain, Asano Tsunaaki, who was Mitsuaki's eldest son, had Kujo Michifusa's daughter as his legal wife and successor wife. Michifusa's mother was Toyotomi Kanshi, the daughter of Toyotomi Hidekatsu. As a result, the Asano clan inherited the bloodline of the Toyotomi clan through the female line.

After the death of the 14th shogun, Tokugawa Iemochi, and the defeat of the shogunate army in the Second Long March, the Hiroshima domain gradually aligned itself with the Choshu Domain. In 1867, they formed an alliance with the Choshu and Satsuma clans to overthrow the Shogunate. However, their plea to restore imperial rule to the 15th Shogun, Tokugawa Yoshinobu, was seen as opportunistic, leading to mistrust and their removal from the mainstream of the Meiji Restoration. Despite this, the Hiroshima Domain joined the government army and fought in the Boshin War.

In 1869, the 12th lord of the domain, Asano Nagakoto, became the governor of the Hiroshima Domain after the restoration of land ownership. The domain reported a total debt of 3,742,290 ryo to the Meiji government in the same year. In 1871, the Hiroshima Domain was abolished and became Hiroshima Prefecture, along with the establishment of prefectures nationwide. Reports indicated that there were over 830,000 ryo of uncollected domain bills, which were to be exchanged by the Meiji government, after the abolition of domains and the establishment of prefectures.

== Hiroshimashinden Domain ==
The Hiroshimashinden Domain (広島新田藩), founded in the 1730s by Asano Nagakata, member of the Asano clan, received 30,000 koku of rice. Governed by daimyo Edo Sadafu, the main family lived in Edo. In 1864, the Hiroshimashinden Domain established a Yoshida Jinya in Yoshida, now Akitakata City. By 1869, it was absorbed into the Hiroshima Domain, ending the Hiroshimashinden Domain.

== List of daimyo ==
#	Name	Tenure	Courtesy title	Court Rank	kokudaka
Mōri clan, 1591 - 1600 (Tozama daimyo)
1	Mōri Terumoto (毛利輝元)	1591 - 1600	Uemonokan (大輔 宮内)	Junior 4th Rank, Lower Grade (従五位下)	1,120,000 koku
Fukushima clan, 1600 - 1619 (Tozama daimyo)
1	Fukushima Masanori (福島 正則)	1600 - 1619	Saemon Daibu (左衛門 だいぶ)	Junior 5th Rank, Lower Grade (従五位下)	498,223 koku
Asano clan, 1619 - 1871 (Tozama daimyo)
1	Asano Nagaakira (浅野長晟)	1619 - 1632	Tajima no kami (但馬守)	Junior 4th Rank, Lower Grade (従五位下)	426,550 koku
2	Asano Mitsuakira (浅野光晟)	1632 - 1672	Kii no kami, Aki no kami (紀伊守、安芸守)	Junior 4th Rank, Lower Grade (従五位下)	426,550 koku
3	Asano Tsunaakira (浅野綱晟)	1672 - 1673	Danjo Daisuke (弾正大弼)	Junior 4th Rank, Lower Grade (従五位下)	426,550 koku
4	Asano Tsunanaga (浅野綱長)	1673 - 1708	Aki no kami (安芸守)	Junior 4th Rank, Lower Grade (従五位下)	426,550 koku
5	Asano Yoshinaga (浅野吉長)	1708 - 1752	Shimoaki no kami (下秋の髪)	Junior 4th Rank, Lower Grade (従五位下)	426,550 koku
6	Asano Munetsune (浅野宗恒)	1752 – 1763	Ise no kami, Aki no kami, Gyobu Daisuke, Tajima no kami (伊勢守、安芸守、魚部大輔、 但馬守)	Junior 4th Rank, Lower Grade (従五位下)	426,550 koku
7	Asano Shigeakira (浅野重晟)	1763 – 1799	Aki no kami (安芸守)	Junior 4th Rank, Lower Grade (従五位下)	426,550 koku
8	Asano Narikata (浅野斉賢)	1799 - 1830	Aki no kami (安芸守)	Junior 4th Rank, Lower Grade (従五位下)	426,550 koku
9	Asano Naritaka (浅野斉粛)	1830 - 1858	Aki no kami (安芸守)	Junior 4th Rank, Lower Grade (従五位下)	426,550 koku
10	Asano Yoshiteru (浅野慶熾)	1858	Aki no kami (安芸守)	Junior 4th Rank, Lower Grade (従五位下)	426,550 koku
11	Asano Nagamichi (浅野茂長)	1858 - 1869	Aki no kami (安芸守)	Junior 4th Rank, Lower Grade (従五位下)	426,550 koku
12	Asano Nagakoto (浅野茂勲)	1869 - 1871	None (なし)	Junior 5th Rank, Lower Grade (従五位下)	426,550 koku

Hiroshimashinden Domain

#	Name	Tenure	Courtesy title	Court Rank	kokudaka
Asano clan, 1730 - 1869 (fudai daimyo)
1	Asano Nagakata (浅野長賢)	1730 - 1744	Hyobu Shosuke, Miyauchi Shosuke (兵部少輔、宮内少輔)	Junior 5th Rank, Lower Grade (従五位下)	30,000 koku
2	Asano Nagataka (浅野長喬)	1744 - 1769	Hyobu Shosuke (兵部少輔)	Junior 5th Rank, Lower Grade (従五位下)	30,000 koku
3	Asano Nagakazu (浅野長員)	1769 - 1800	Omi no kami (近江守)	Junior 5th Rank, Lower Grade (従五位下)	30,000 koku
4	Asano Nagahiro (浅野長容)	1800 - 1824	Omi no kami (近江守)	Junior 5th Rank, Lower Grade (従五位下)	30,000 koku
5	Asano Nagamichi (浅野長訓)	1824 - 1858	Mimasaka no kami, Omi no kami (美作守、近江守)	Junior 5th Rank, Lower Grade (従五位下)	30,000 koku
6	Asano Nagakoto (浅野長勲)	1858 - 1862	Kii no kami (紀伊守)	Junior 5th Rank, Lower Grade (従五位下)	30,000 koku
7	Asano Nagaatsu (浅野長厚)	1862 - 1869	Omi no kami (近江守)	Junior 5th Rank, Lower Grade (従五位下)	30,000 koku

*The years listed are those in which the lord occupied Hiroshima castle, not the years of his life. **All of the lords after Asano Nagaakira enjoyed the same 426,500 koku.

=== Simplified family tree of the Asano lords of Hiroshima ===
The following a simplified family tree of the Asano lords.

- I. Nagaakira, 1st Lord of Hiroshima (cr. 1619) (1586–1632; Lord: 1619–1632)
  - II. Mitsuakira, 2nd Lord of Hiroshima (1617–1693; r. 1632–1672)
    - III. Tsunaakira, 3rd Lord of Hiroshima (1637–1673; r. 1672–1673)
      - IV. Tsunanaga, 4th Lord of Hiroshima (1659–1708; r. 1673–1708)
        - V. Yoshinaga, 5th Lord of Hiroshima (1681–1752; r. 1708–1752)
          - VI. Munetsune, 6th Lord of Hiroshima (1717–1788; r. 1752–1763)
            - VII. Shigeakira, 7th Lord of Hiroshima (1743–1814; r. 1763–1799)
              - VIII. Narikata, 8th Lord of Hiroshima (1773–1831; r. 1799–1830)
                - IX. Naritaka, 9th Lord of Hiroshima (1817–1868; r. 1831–1858)
                  - X. Yoshiteru, 10th Lord of Hiroshima (1836–1858; r. 1858)
              - Nagatoshi
                - XI. Nagamichi, 5th Lord of Hiroshima-Shinden, 11th Lord of Hiroshima, 26th family head (1812–1872; Lord of Hiroshima-Shinden: 1824–1858; Lord of Hiroshima: 1858–1869; 26th family head: 1869–1872)
                - Toshitsugu
                  - Nagayuki, 28th family head, 2nd Marquess (1864–1947; 28th family head and 2nd Marquess: 1937–1940)
                    - Nagatake, 29th family head, 3rd Marquess (1895–1969; 29th family head: 1940–1969; 3rd Marquess: 1940–1947)
                      - Nagayoshi, 30th family head (1927–2007; 30th family head: 1969–2007)
                        - Nagataka, 31st family head (b. 1956; 31st family head: 2007–present)
                - Toshiteru
                  - XII. Nagakoto, 6th Lord of Hiroshima-Shinden, 12th Lord of Hiroshima, 27th family head, 1st Marquess (1842–1937; Lord of Hiroshima-Shinden: 1858–1869; Lord of Hiroshima: 1869; Governor of Hiroshima: 1869–1871; 27th family head: 1872–1937; Marquess: cr. 1884)

== See also ==
- List of han
- Abolition of the han system
