= Asano Shigeakira =

Japanese daimyō

Asano Shigeakira (December 2, 1743 – January 4, 1814) was a Japanese daimyō of the Edo period, who ruled the Hiroshima Domain.

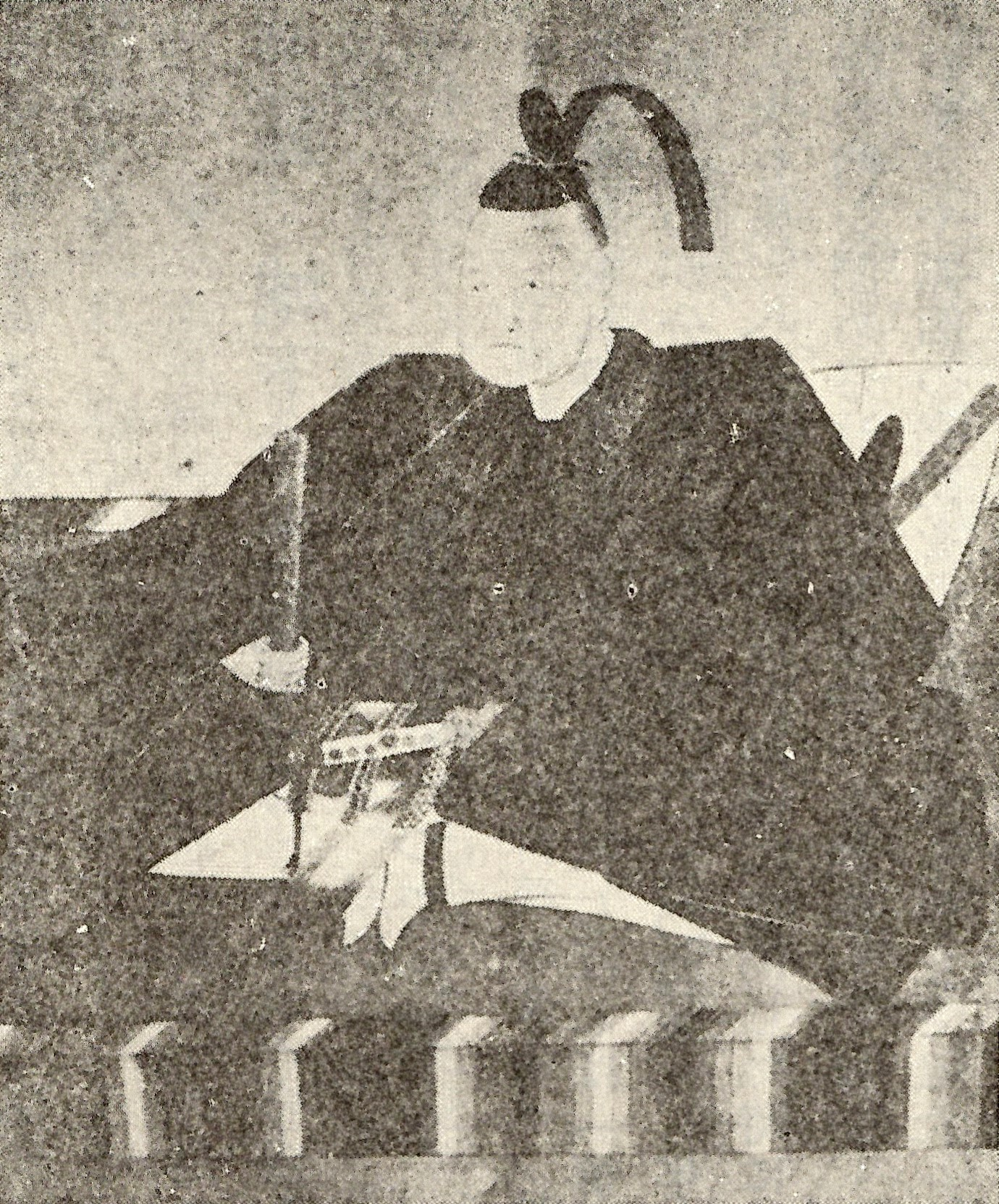

== Family ==
- Father: Asano Munetsune
- Mother: Izumi no Kata
- Wives:
  - Tokugawa Kunihime (1736–1767), daughter of Tokugawa Munekatsu, 8th Daimyo of Owari Domain
  - Tokugawa Yokohime (1751–1773), daughter of Tokugawa Munekatsu of Owari Domain
- Children:
  - Iwamatsu by Kunihime
  - Asano Narikata by Yokohime
  - Mori Hayatsu (1769–1801) of Mikazuki Domain
  - Asano Nagatoshi
  - Asano Nagatomo
  - Asano Samumaru
  - Katsuko married Mizuno Tadamitsu of Karatsu Domain
  - Koki-in married Nanbu Toshitaka of Morioka Domain
  - daughter married Ito Hirotami of Obi Domain
  - daughter married Asano Nagakata
  - daughter married Akimoto Chikatomo
  - daughter married Ogasawara Nagateru

Preceded by Asano Munetsune	7th (Asano) Daimyō of Hiroshima; 1763–1799	Succeeded by Asano Narikata
