= Asano =

- Language: Japanese

Asano (written: 浅野, 淺野 or hiragana あさの) is a Japanese language surname. Notable people with the surname include:

- Asano clan, samurai family in feudal Japan.
  - Asano Mitsuakira (浅野 光晟; 1617–1693), Japanese samurai
  - Asano Munetsune (浅野 宗恒; 1717–1788), Japanese daimyō
  - Asano Nagaakira (浅野 長晟; 1586–1632), Japanese samurai
  - Asano Nagakoto (浅野 長勲; 1842–1937), Japanese daimyō, politician and diplomat
  - Asano Nagamasa (浅野 長政; 1546–1611), Japanese samurai
  - Asano Nagamichi (浅野 長訓; 1812–1872), Japanese daimyō
  - Asano Naganao (浅野 長直; 1610–1672), Japanese daimyō
  - Asano Naganori (浅野 長矩; 1667–1701), Japanese daimyō and important historical figure title: Takumi no Kami
  - Asano Nagatake (浅野 長武; 1895–1969), the 29th family head of the clan
  - Asano Nagatomo (浅野 長友; 1643–1675), Japanese daimyō
  - Asano Nagayoshi (1927–2007), the 30th family head of the clan
  - Asano Nagayuki (浅野 長之; 1864–1947), the 28th family head of the clan
  - Asano Narikata (浅野 斉賢; 1773–1831), Japanese daimyō
  - Asano Naritaka (浅野 斉粛; 1817–1868), Japanese daimyō
  - Asano Shigeakira (浅野 重晟; 1743–1814), Japanese daimyō
  - Asano Tsunaakira (浅野 綱晟; 1637–1673), Japanese daimyō
  - Asano Tsunanaga (浅野 綱長; 1659–1708), Japanese daimyō
  - Asano Yoshinaga (浅野 幸長; 1576–1613)), Japanese samurai and feudal lord
  - Asano Yoshinaga (Lord of Hiroshima) (浅野 吉長; 1681–1752), Japanese daimyō
  - Asano Yoshiteru (浅野 慶熾; 1836–1858), Japanese daimyō
- Aiko Asano (浅野 愛子; born 1969), Japanese actress and singer
- Atsuko Asano (浅野 温子; born 1961), Japanese actress
- Atsuko Asano (writer) (あさの あつこ; born 1954) Japanese writer
- Hiroaki Asano (浅野 博亮; born 1990), Japanese volleyball player
- Inio Asano (浅野 いにお; born 1980), Japanese manga artist
- Katsuhito Asano (浅野 勝人; born 1938), Japanese politician
- Kevin Asano (born 1963), retired judoka from the United States
- Koji Asano, Japanese musician and composer
- Masumi Asano (浅野 真澄; born 1977), Japanese voice actress, singer and narrator
- Mayumi Asano (archer) (浅野 真弓; born 1976), Japanese archer
- Mayumi Asano (浅野 まゆみ; born 1969), Japanese voice actress
- Mia Asano, (born 1999) American musician
- Natsumi Asano (浅野 菜摘; born 1997), Japanese footballer
- Noriko Asano (浅野 典子; born 1955), Japanese swimmer
- Rika Asano (浅野 里香; born 1994), Japanese NHK announcer
- Rin Asano (浅野 りん), manga artist of Deaimon
- Ryo Asano, Japanese windsurfer
- Ryota Asano (浅野 良太; born 1979), Japanese rugby union player
- Sakiyo Asano (浅野 祥代; born 1987), Japanese field hockey player
- Shogo Asano (浅野 翔吾; born 2004), Japanese baseball player
- Shirō Asano (disambiguation), multiple people
- Sōichirō Asano (浅野 総一郎; 1848–1930), Japanese businessman
- Tadanobu Asano (浅野 忠信; born 1973), Japanese actor, director, and musician
- Takashi Asano (浅野 孝; born 1937), Japanese-born environmental engineer and a professor emeritus
- Takuma Asano (浅野 拓磨; born 1994), Japanese professional footballer
- Tetsuo Asano (浅野 哲夫; born 1949), Japanese computer scientist
- Tetsuya Asano (浅野 哲也; born 1967), Japanese professional football manager and former player
- Tomoya Asano (浅野 智也; born 1978), Japanese game producer
- Yōichi Asano (浅野 洋一), Japanese photographer,
- Yūko Asano (浅野 ゆう子; born 1960), Japanese actress and singer
- Yuya Asano (浅野 雄也; born 1997), Japanese footballer

== People with the given name ==
- Asano Nagasato (永里 亜紗乃; born 1989), Japanese former footballer

== Fictional characters ==
- Rin Asano, a character from Blade of the Immortal

== See also ==
- Asano-gumi, yakuza (criminal) gang based in Okayama, Japan
