= Iris Out/Jane Doe =

Iris Out/Jane Doe may refer to:

- "Iris Out", 2025 single by Kenshi Yonezu
- "Jane Doe" (Kenshi Yonezu and Hikaru Utada song)
