= Yoichi =

Yoichi may refer to:

- Yōichi, Japanese given name
- Yoichi District, Hokkaidō (余市郡, Yoichi-gun), district in Shiribeshi, Hokkaidō Prefecture, Japan
- Yoichi, Hokkaidō (余市町, Yoichi-chō), town in Yoichi District
- Yoichi distillery (余市蒸溜所, Yoichi jōryūsho), a Japanese whisky distillery in the town
- Yoichi Station (余市駅, Yoichi-eki), train station in Yoichi District
