= Bow and Arrow (song) =

Single by Kenshi Yonezu
- Language: Japanese
- A-side: "Plazma"
- Released: January 27, 2025
- Genre: J-pop; anison
- Length: 2:55
- Label: Sony Music Labels
- Songwriter: Kenshi Yonezu
- Producer: Kenshi Yonezu

Kenshi Yonezu singles chronology
"Azalea" (2024)	"Plazma" / "Bow and Arrow" (2025)	"Iris Out" / "Jane Doe" (2025)

Music video
- "Bow and Arrow" on YouTube

External videos
- Kenshi Yonezu - "Bow and Arrow" / Yuzuru Hanyu Short Program ver. on YouTube
- Kenshi Yonezu - "Bow and Arrow" (Live) on YouTube
- Kenshi Yonezu × Yuzuru Hanyu - "Bow and Arrow" Conversation on YouTube
- TV Anime『Medalist』Main PV｜Opening Theme Song：Kenshi Yonezu「BOW AND ARROW」 on YouTube
- TV Anime「Medalist」Non-credit Opening Video｜Kenshi Yonezu「BOW AND ARROW」 on YouTube
- Manga『Medalist』× Kenshi Yonezu『BOW AND ARROW』｜Special MV on YouTube

"Bow and Arrow" (stylized in all caps) is a song by Japanese singer-songwriter Kenshi Yonezu. Released digitally on January 27, 2025 via Sony Music Labels, before a physical double A-sided CD with "Plazma" was issued on June 11, 2025, "Bow and Arrow" serves as the opening theme song for the Japanese anime series Medalist.

== Background ==
"Bow and Arrow" (stylized in all caps) is a song that has been written for the opening to the anime series Medalist, which centers around the popular sport figure skating. This marked Kenshi Yonezu's first time providing a theme song for a TV anime in about 2 years and 3 months, since "Kick Back" from Chainsaw Man.

The song was created at Yonezu's own request, as he was already a fan of the original Medalist manga by Tsurumaikada.

Regarding what led to the song's creation and his feelings about the original manga, Yonezu commented as follows:

I'm simply a fan of the original work. When I came across the news that it was being adapted into an anime, I thought, 'If possible, I'd love to make the theme song,' and reached out. That's what led to the creation of "Bow and Arrow". It's an absolutely wonderful manga, so everyone should read it. I'm also looking forward to the anime just as a regular viewer. I hope you'll enjoy the song as well. — Kenshi Yonezu

On the other hand, Tsurumaikada shared that they had been a fan of Yonezu ever since his days releasing Vocaloid music under the name Hachi, particularly after hearing "Persona Alice." They said that listening to Hachi's songs helped shape their own unstable sense of identity, and that having Yonezu sing the theme song for an anime based on their own manga felt like such an honor, it was "hard to believe it was happening in real life."

== Release and reception ==
On December 6, 2024, it was announced that "Bow and Arrow" had been written as the opening theme for the anime series Medalist.

On January 11, 2025, a non-credit opening video for Medalist featuring a one-chorus version of the song was released on YouTube. At the same time, a new artist photo of Kenshi Yonezu was also unveiled.

On January 23, along with the announcement of the song's official release date, jacket artwork illustrated by Yonezu himself was revealed. The cover features Inori Yuitsuka, the protagonist of Medalist.

On January 27, the song was released digitally.

On March 5, the official music video, directed by Kyotaro Hayashi and featuring two-time Olympic champion figure skater Yuzuru Hanyu, was released. This marked Hayashi's first time directing a music video for Yonezu since "Red Out." Within a day of its release on YouTube, the video surpassed 2.5 million views and over 10,000 comments, reached #1 on YouTube's Trending chart in Japan, and ranked #6 globally on the daily music video charts. That same night, Yonezu posted a short version of the video on his X (formerly Twitter) account, which reached around 25 million views in under 24 hours.

On March 13, a special "Yuzuru Hanyu Short Program Ver." of the music video was released. Immediately after, a conversation video between Yonezu and Hanyu was also published. The talk video became a hot topic, attracting nearly 50,000 concurrent viewers within just 30 minutes of its release.

On April 30, it was announced that the double A-sided CD single "Plazma/Bow and Arrow" would be released on June 11. The CD was set to be available in four formats: the Haro Edition, an Installer Device Edition, and two Regular Editions with different jacket covers and track order.

On June 9, a live performance video of "Bow and Arrow" was released on YouTube. It was recorded during the Kenshi Yonezu 2025 Tour / Junk concert held at Tokyo Dome earlier that year.

On July 23, Billboard Japan Streaming Songs announced that the song had been played over 100 million times.

== Composition ==
The title "Bow and Arrow" did not exist until the first verse of the chorus was composed. The title was inspired by the final line of the chorus, "I let go of my hand," and symbolizes the relationship between "the one who pushes forward" and "the one being pushed." Ideas like a fighter jet catapult or a hammer throw were also considered, but ultimately, the title "Bow and Arrow" ("弓と矢" in Japanese) was chosen. The imagery overlaps with the dynamic between the "protector" and the "protected." The "Bow and Arrow" metaphor specifically represents the relationship between the characters in Medalist, coach Tsukasa Akeuraji and the protagonist Inori Yuitsuka, a young girl who aspires to become a skater.

Kenshi Yonezu described the track as a song that "piles up a jumble of sounds and tries to maximize the amount of information it can convey." Before he started working on the song, he got some input from the Medalist anime production team who suggested creating something with a similar vibe to his earlier song "Peace Sign". While not a direct response to Peace Sign, which was written from the perspective of children moving forward with passion, he said it follows in the same vein. This time, however, the song is told from the point of view of the adults who support and protect those kids from behind.

Musically, Yonezu deliberately returned to his roots of music creation by producing the entire track himself using DTM (desktop music software), just as he did during his Vocaloid era. Lyrically, the song is full of metaphor and deliberately obsessive rhyme schemes, particularly using the "e" vowel sound. This technique builds a sense of "tension," like drawing a bowstring. In key moments, however, Yonezu intentionally breaks the rhyme, highlighting certain lines and drawing the listener's attention. This sudden shift represents "release," or the moment when the arrow is loosed. In the first 90 seconds of the song, a beat resembling the ticking of a clock can be heard. This section is the same length as a typical anime opening, and is also seen as a tribute to figure skating, where performance durations are strictly defined by rules.

The arrangement of the version used in the anime's opening and the one released as the full song are different. This was because a significant amount of time passed between producing the TV-length version and the full version. During that period, Yonezu's creative direction evolved, leading him to start over and make new choices for the final release.

== Music video ==
Two versions of the music video have been released: the standard version, featuring footage of figure skater Yuzuru Hanyu performing on ice alongside Kenshi Yonezu singing, and a "Short Program version" focused primarily on Hanyu's skating performance.

This marked Hanyu's first-ever appearance in a music video, made possible by what Yonezu described as a “long-shot” offer from his side. Hanyu was extremely busy performing in his self-produced Echoes of Life tour when the offer came, and the only window in which he could realistically prepare for the project was after his tour ended on February 9, 2025. However, Hanyu revealed that he had been a fan of Yonezu since the days when he went by the name Hachi and, after hearing the song, he felt a connection between its title and his own name (Yuzuru; lit. 'tie the bowstring'), and accepted the offer, thinking, "I have no choice but to do it."

Although Yonezu himself admits he is "almost completely unfamiliar with figure skating," the song's runtime of about 2 minutes and 50 seconds closely aligns with the official International Skating Union regulation length for competitive short programs (2:40~2:50). Hanyu said he felt a sense of fate in that coincidence, and he choreographed and skated to the short program version himself, strictly following competition rules and including all seven required technical elements. The program, which includes a quadruple Lutz (4Lz), triple Axel (3A), flying sit spin (FSSp), quadruple Salchow–triple toe loop combination (4S+3T), change camel spin (CCSp), step sequence (StSq), and combination spin (CCoSp), is the most technically difficult composition Hanyu has ever performed.

The performance includes not only high-difficulty elements such as the quadruple Lutz and a quadruple Salchow–triple toe loop combination jump, but also features key technical elements for the manga and anime storyline, such as a flying sit spin followed by a broken leg spin, and a step sequence, as well as Hanyu's own signature moves: the triple Axel, hydroblading, Biellmann spin, layback Ina Bauer and sit twizzles. Difficult jumps are typically placed early in a figure skating program, when the skater's stamina is at its peak, which is why the first jump usually occurs around the 20-second mark. However, in "Bow and Arrow", the quad Lutz is performed approximately 45 seconds into the routine. This timing was a deliberate choice by Hanyu, who wanted to align the jump with the moment Hikaru Kamisaki executes it in the opening sequence of the anime Medalist. Another reason for including the quad lutz was the manga's own depiction of Jun Yodaka landing the same jump.

The music video was directed by Kyotaro Hayashi, who had previously directed three other videos for Yonezu: "Teenage Riot", "M87" and "Red Out". He had also worked with Hanyu directing the videos for his Tokyo Dome ice show Gift. The "Bow and Arrow" music video was filmed in a cool blue tone, a visual style Hanyu often favors. Film director Hiroshi Okuyama served as the cinematographer. Okuyama had directed the music video of Yonezu's song "Spinning Globe", and had gained experience filming figure skating from his film My Sunshine.

Both versions of the video are included on the DVD bundled with the Installer Device Edition of the CD single "Plazma / Bow and Arrow".

== Accolades ==
Awards and nominations for "Bow and Arrow"
Ceremony	Year	Award	Result	Ref.
Anime Grand Prix	2025	Best Theme Song	5th place	
Japan Expo Awards	2026	Daruma for Best Opening	Nominated	
Japan Gold Disc Award	2026	Best 3 Songs by Download	Won	

== Charts ==
=== Weekly charts ===
Weekly chart performance for "Bow and Arrow"
Chart (2025)	Peak position
Global Excl. U.S (Billboard)	163
Japan Hot 100 (Billboard)	4
Japan Hot Animation (Billboard Japan)	2
Japan (Oricon) with "Plazma"	1
Japan Combined Singles (Oricon) with "Plazma"	1
Japan Anime Singles (Oricon) with "Plazma"	1
South Korea Download (Circle)	79

=== Monthly charts ===
Monthly chart performance for "Bow and Arrow"
Chart (2025)	Position
Japan (Oricon) with "Plazma"	4
Japan Anime Singles (Oricon) with "Plazma"	2

=== Year-end charts ===
Year-end chart performance for "Bow and Arrow"
Chart (2025)	Position
Japan (Japan Hot 100)	23
Japan Hot Animation (Billboard Japan)	8
Japan (Oricon) with "Plazma"	31
Japan Combined Singles (Oricon) with "Plazma"	5

== Certifications ==
Certifications for "Bow and Arrow"
Region	Certification	Certified units/sales
Japan (RIAJ) Download	Gold	100,000^{*}
Japan (RIAJ) Streaming	Platinum	100,000,000^{†}
^{*} Sales figures based on certification alone.^{†} Streaming-only figures based on certification alone.

Certifications for "Plazma/Bow and Arrow"
Region	Certification	Certified units/sales
Japan (RIAJ)	Platinum	250,000^{^}
^{^} Shipments figures based on certification alone.
