= Hyakumangoku Matsuri =

Festival in Kanazawa, Japan

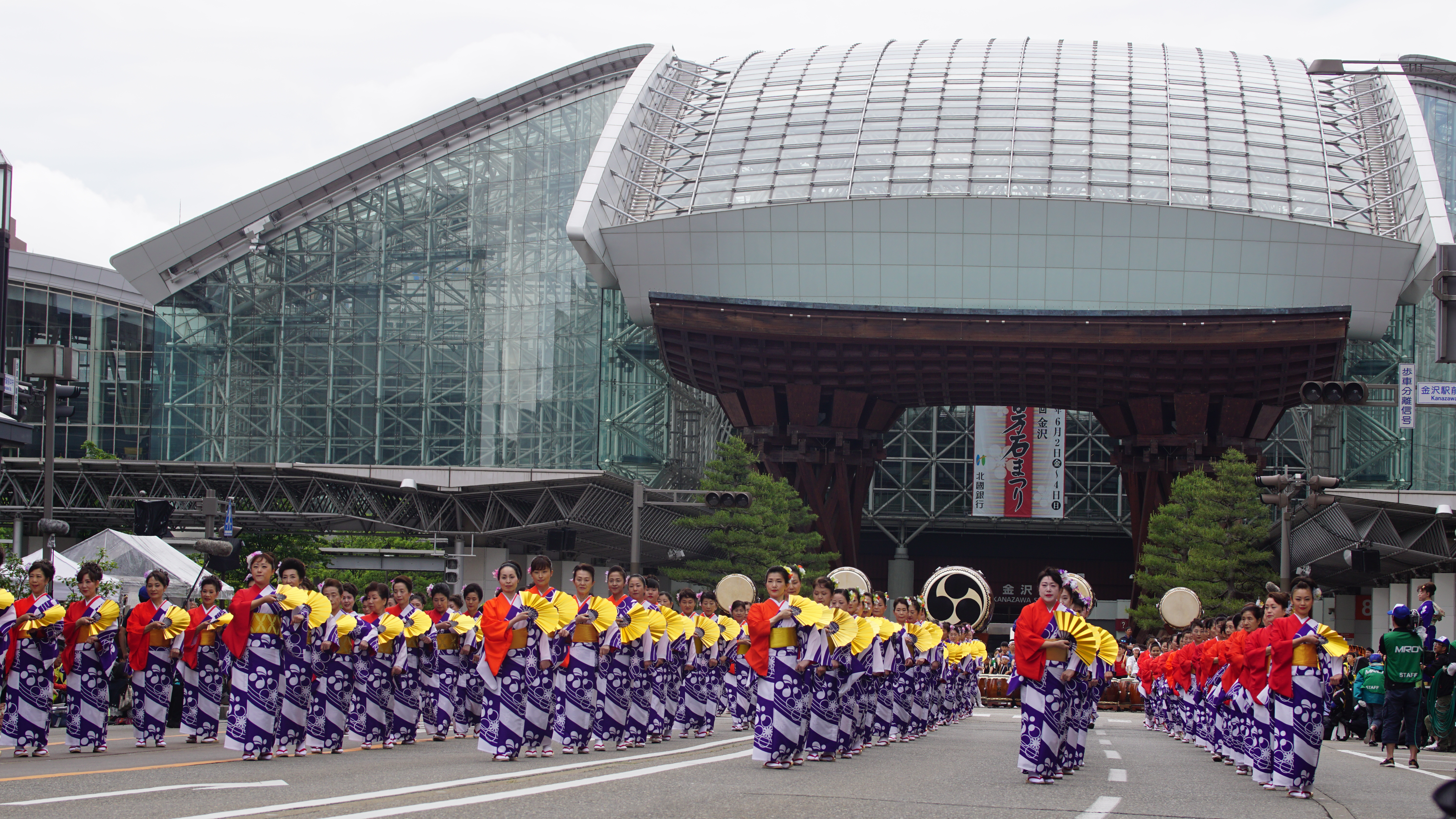
- Hyakumangoku parade outside of Kanazawa station
- Type: Cultural
- Date: first Saturday in June

The Hyakumangoku Matsuri (百万石まつり) is the main annual festival taking place in Kanazawa, Japan. The festival commemorates the entry of Lord Maeda Toshiie into Kanazawa Castle in 1583. The highlight of the festival is the Hyakumangoku Parade, which has begun on the first Saturday in June since 2007.

The Hyakumangoku Parade reenacts the entrance of Lord Maeda Toshiie and his entourage into Kanazawa. The participants are dressed in 16th-century period costumes and parade around several city blocks. In the 2025 festival, 2,500 people took part in the procession.

The name Hyakumangoku refers to rice production. Hyakuman means "1,000,000" (literally "100 10,000") and the koku is a measurement of rice production. 1,000,000 koku is around 150,000 tonnes or 5,000,000 bushels of rice.

In the evening after the main parade there are Bon Festival dances starting from 19.00 h and ending late in the night. Employees from different companies wear different kimono, but anyone can join the dances. The traditional Japanese dance along the central street near Kohrinbo is a picturesque event, and the column of dancing people is several kilometers long.

Tourou nagashi (灯篭流し) commences the night before the main festival. Lit Kaga Yuzen lanterns are floated down the river Asano at dusk, starting near the Tenjin-Bashi bridge. The lanterns then float under the Ume-no-Hashi bridge before finishing at the Asanogawa Ohashi bridge.

Other events during the festival include tea ceremonies staged in Kenroku-en, performances of traditional arts and folk dancing, a "Miss Hyakumangoku" beauty contest, and a children's drum and lantern parade.

== Picture gallery ==
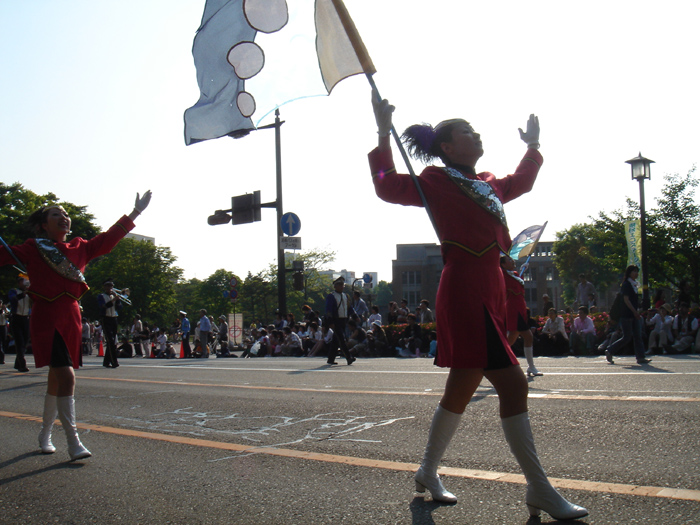

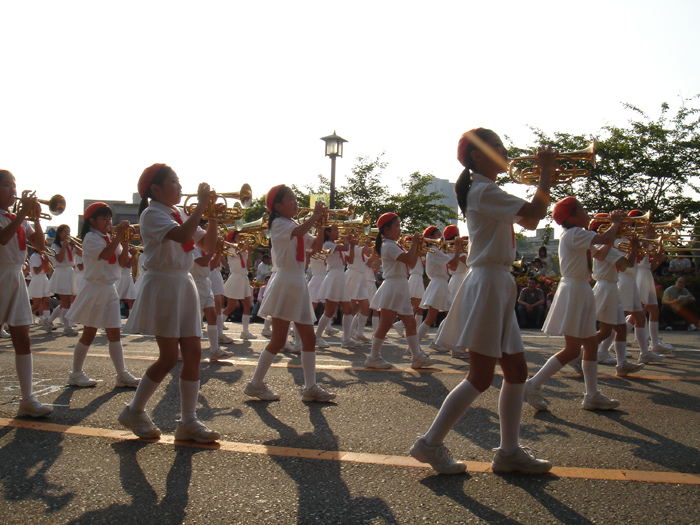

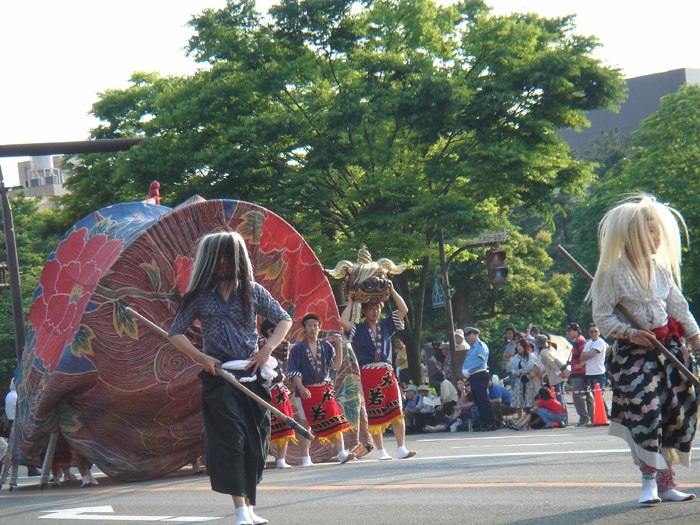

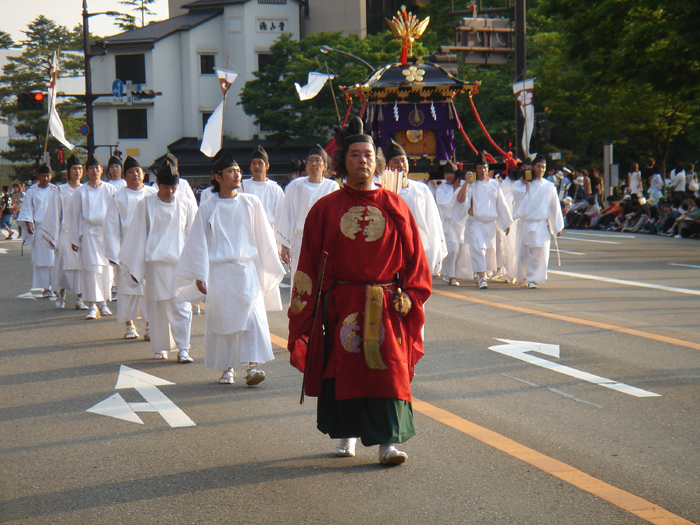

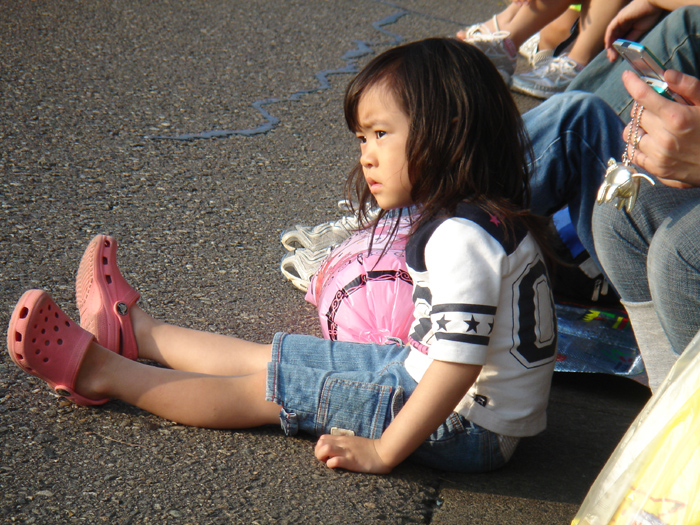

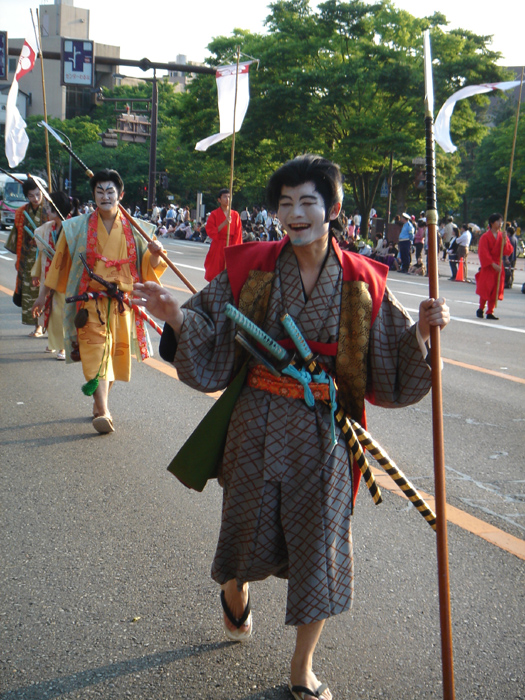

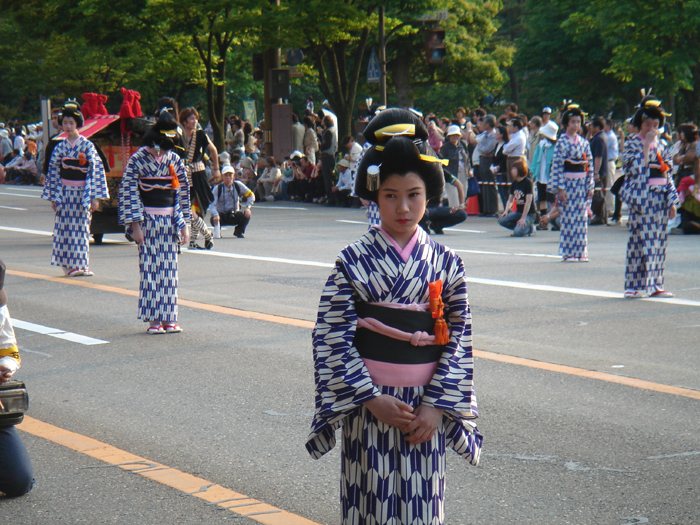

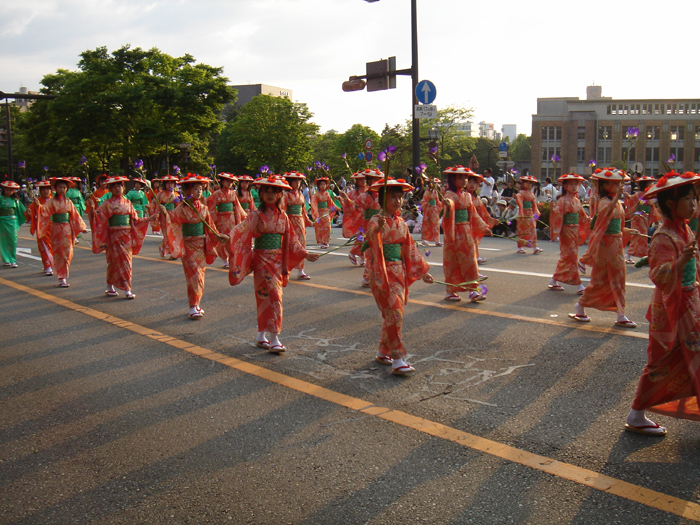

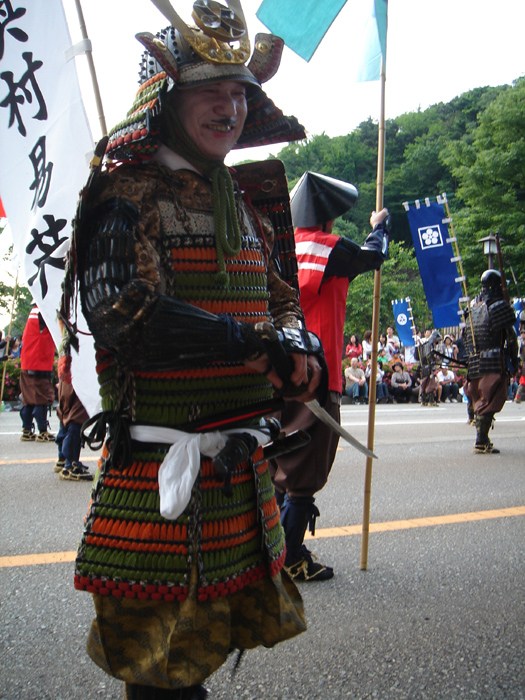

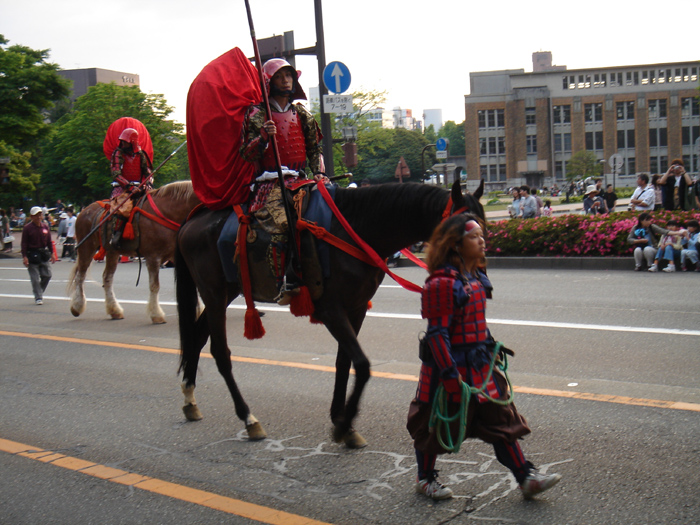

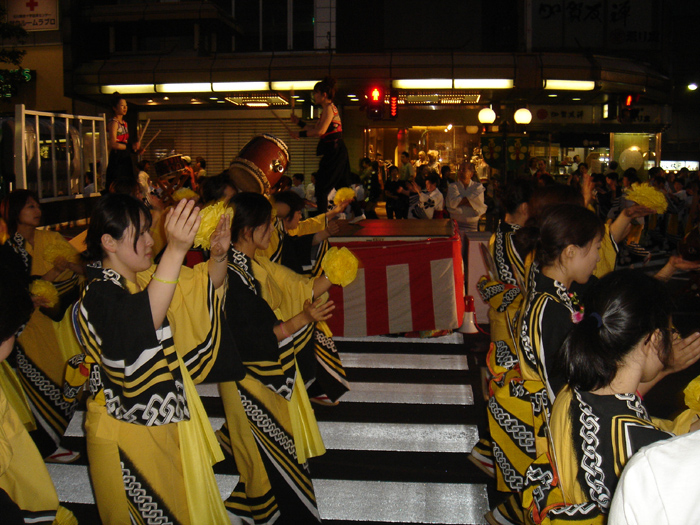

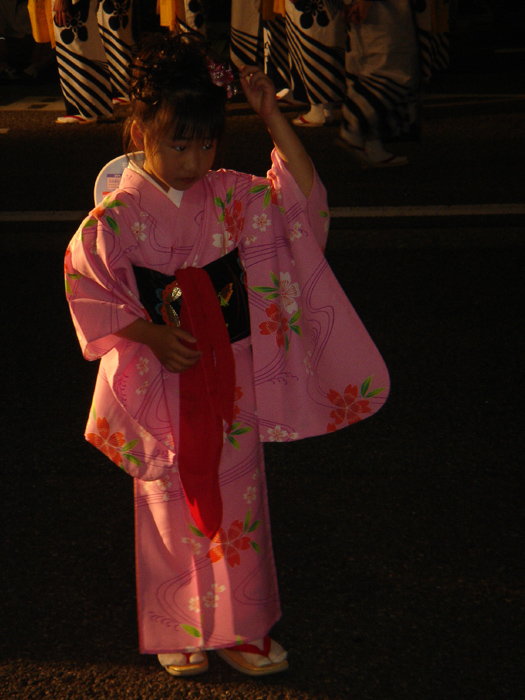

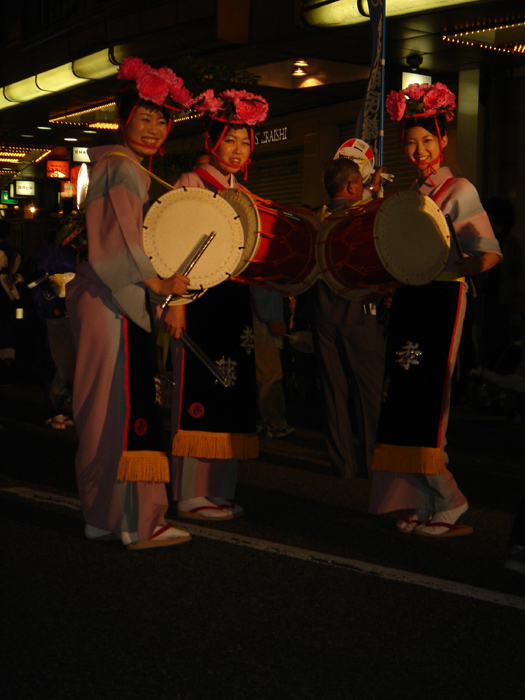

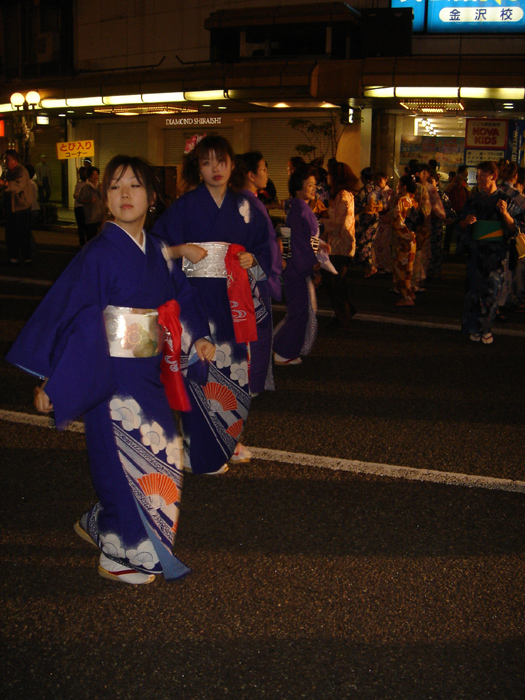

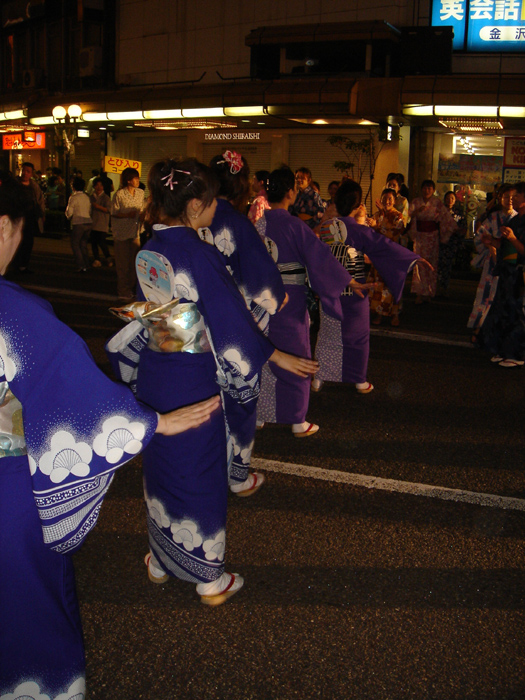
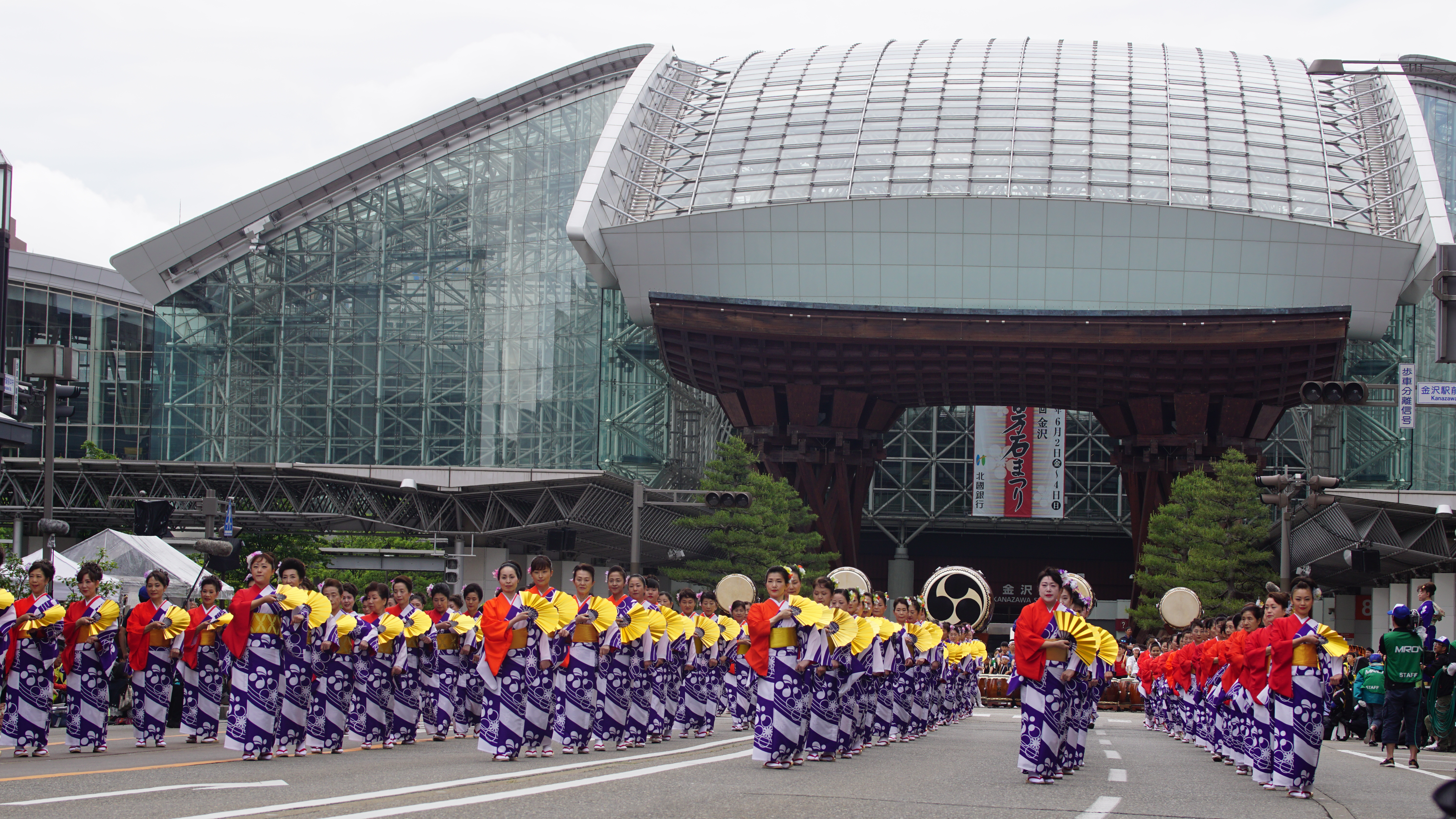
