= Mobile Suit Gundam GQuuuuuuX =

Japanese anime television series

- Key visual for the series, featuring lead protagonist Amate "Machu" Yuzuriha, the eponymous Gundam GQuuuuuuX mech, and the mechanical mascot Haro
- 機動戦士Gundam GQuuuuuuX
- Genre: Mecha; Military science fiction
- Created by: Yoshiyuki Tomino; Hajime Yatate
- Developed by: Yoji Enokido
- Screenplay by: Yoji Enokido; Hideaki Anno
- Directed by: Kazuya Tsurumaki
- Voices of: Tomoyo Kurosawa; Yui Ishikawa; Shimba Tsuchiya; Shinji Kawada; Seiichiro Yamashita; Akane Fujita; Yuuki Shin
- Music by: Yoshimasa Terui; Masayuki Hasuo
- Opening theme: "Plazma" by Kenshi Yonezu
- Ending theme: "Mō Dō Natte mo Ii ya" by Hoshimachi Suisei
- Country of origin: Japan
- Original language: Japanese
- No. of episodes: 12

Production
- Executive producer: Naohiro Ogata
- Producers: Keisuke Kasai; Masayuki Banzai
- Animators: Studio Khara; Sunrise
- Production companies: Bandai Namco Filmworks; Nippon Television Network Corporation

Original release
- Network: NNS (Nippon TV), BS11
- Release: April 9 – June 25, 2025

Related
- Anime film

Mobile Suit Gundam GQuuuuuuX: Beginning
- Directed by: Kazuya Tsurumaki
- Written by: Yoji Enokido; Hideaki Anno
- Music by: Yoshimasa Terui; Masayuki Hasuo
- Studio: Studio Khara; Sunrise
- Licensed by: AU: Sugoi Co (theatrical release); NA: GKIDS (theatrical release)
- Released: January 17, 2025
- Runtime: 81 minutes

Mobile Suit Gundam GQuuuuuuX (Japanese: 機動戦士Gundam GQuuuuuuX, Hepburn: Kidō Senshi Gandamu Jīkuakusu) (Note: Pronounced (/ˈdʒikwʌks/), and often colloquially spelled "g-quacks", "g-quax", or "g-qwux" in English) is a Japanese anime television series jointly produced by Studio Khara and Sunrise. It is the sixteenth mainline installment of the Gundam franchise, the first full series to be set in the Universal Century calendar since Mobile Suit Victory Gundam (although set in an alternate timeline), the second television series to be aired during Japan's Reiwa era, and the second in a row after The Witch from Mercury to feature a female lead.

A compilation film was released in January 2025, while the TV series itself aired shortly thereafter from April to June of the same year. The TV series is the shortest in the franchise's history by episode count (excluding OVAs), having a total of 12 episodes.

== Story ==
=== Overview ===
The series is set in an alternate version of the Universal Century timeline, which diverges from the original Mobile Suit Gundam series' continuity, as Char Aznable seizes the RX-78-02 White Gundam alongside the Pegasus class ship White Base during his assault on Side 7. Char becomes the pilot of the Gundam instead of Amuro Ray, renaming it the "gMS-α Red Gundam". This drastically changes the outcome of the One Year War between the Earth Federation and the Principality of Zeon, culminating with Zeon's victory. However, Char and the Red Gundam disappear after this in a phenomenon called Zeknova, prompting a search by Zeon.

Some characters in the series who had died in the original Universal Century timeline, such as Challia Bull and Kycilia Zabi, survive in this divergent timeline.

=== Plot ===
In UC 0085, five years after the Principality of Zeon won the One Year War, Amate Yuzuriha, a high school student living in the Side 6 space colony Izuma, crosses paths with Nyaan, a war refugee. Her encounter with Nyaan leads her to get involved in an incident when both the Principality of Zeon and the Space Police are pursuing the missing Red Gundam after it suddenly re-emerges. To catch the Red Gundam, Zeon sends out Xavier Olivette in the gMS-Ω GQuuuuuuX, a prototype Gundam meant for Newtype pilots. However, while trying to capture the Red Gundam, Xavier crashes into the space colony and is ejected from the GQuuuuuuX. Amate jumps into the cockpit of the GQuuuuuuX, steals it, and subsequently defeats the Police Force, allowing the Red Gundam to escape. The GQuuuuuuX is taken by the Pomeranians, an underground team of mechanics participating in Clan Battles, a series of illegal and high-stakes mobile suit dueling matches. After meeting the Red Gundam's pilot, Shuji, Amate chooses to join him in Clan Battles with the Pomeranians, fighting alongside him in the GQuuuuuuX.

== Characters ==
=== Main ===
Amate Yuzuriha (アマテ・ユズリハ) / Machu (マチュ)
Voiced by: Tomoyo Kurosawa (Japanese); Thea Saccoliti (English)
An ordinary high school student whose usual way of life collapses after she meets refugee Nyaan and vandal Shuji, fighting alongside the latter in underground "Clan Battles", or mobile suit duels. She is the protagonist and central character of the story, and the pilot of the gMS-Ω GQuuuuuuX. She participates in Clan Battles as "Machu", which was her childhood nickname.
Nyaan (ニャアン)
Voiced by: Yui Ishikawa (Japanese); Anairis Quiñones (English)
A courier who became a refugee after war broke out in her homeland of Side 2. Having fled without even having time to take care of her parents, she eventually ends up in the Side 6 space colony Izuma, where she meets Amate, and later Shuji. She pilots the gMS-Ω GQuuuuuuX when Amate isn't available, later becoming the pilot of the gMS-κ GFreD after becoming Kycilia's aide.
Shuji Ito (シュウジ・イトウ, Shūji Itō)
Voiced by: Shimba Tsuchiya (Japanese); Paul Castro Jr. (English)
The enigmatic pilot of the gMS-α Red Gundam originally used by Char Aznable. He moves from place to place, evading the authorities as he spray-paints the outer walls of space colonies. He encounters Amate and Nyaan in Izuma and becomes the former's MAV, or wingman, in Clan Battles, initially participating as "AAA", and, subsequently, as HARAHERIMUSHI (ハラヘリムシ; lit. 'Hungry Bug'). He's accompanied by a four-legged robot named Conch (コンチ, Konchi).

=== Kaneban Co., Ltd. / Pomeranians ===
Annqi (アンキー, Ankī)
Voiced by: Mariya Ise (Japanese); Meredith Zeitlin (English)
President of junk dealer Kaneban Co., Ltd. She's involved in several illegal businesses, including Mobile Suit Clan Battles.
Jezzi (ジェジー, Jejī)
Voiced by: Yukitoshi Tokumoto (Japanese); Jack DeSena (English)
A member of Kaneban Co., Ltd., and a pilot in the Clan Battles, boarding a Zaku-type Mobile Suit.
Pomeranian (ポメラニアン)
Voiced by: Kosuke Echigoya
A pomeranian at Kaneban Co., Ltd. Owned by Jezzi.
Nabu (ナブ)
Voiced by: Shōya Chiba (Japanese); Harley Yeager (English)
A member of Kaneban Co., Ltd., in charge of practical matters.
Kaine (ケーン, Kēn)
Voiced by: Yusuke Nagano (Japanese); Casey Mongillo (English)
A member of Kaneban Co., Ltd, and mechanic.
Haro (ハロ)
Voiced by: Rie Kugimiya (Japanese); Ellie Dritch (English)
An autonomous AI robot who can speak and give information about its surroundings. It accompanies Amate in the gMS-Ω GQuuuuuuX, and later becomes her companion.

=== Principality of Zeon ===
==== Sodon crew ====
Challia Bull (シャリア・ブル, Sharia Buru)
Voiced by: Shinji Kawada (Japanese); Fajer Al-Kaisi (English)
A lieutenant colonel in the Principality of Zeon military, he once conspired with Char Aznable during the One Year War as his MAV. Since Char's disappearance, he has been looking for Char and the Red Gundam, while also subsequently carrying on Char's mission to kill the Zabi family to maintain peace in Zeon.
Challia Bull was originally introduced in "The Newtype: Challia Bull", the 39th episode of the original Mobile Suit Gundam series, which was his only appearance prior to GQuuuuuuX. In this episode, he is recruited to the war with the Earth Federation by Zeon commander Gihren Zabi, who sees promise in Bull's abilities as a Newtype. Although Bull is killed in battle with Amuro Ray in the original series, the divergences in GQuuuuuuX's timeline impact events such that he survives.
Xavier Olivette (エグザベ・オリベ, Eguzabe Oribe)
Voiced by: Seiichiro Yamashita (Japanese); Ry McKeand (English)
A second lieutenant in the Principality of Zeon military, who graduated at the top of his class at the Flanagan School.
He piloted the gMS-Ω GQuuuuuuX for a covert mission to find the Red Gundam, but lost it to Amate after an altercation with Side 6's military police. It is later revealed he worked as a mole under orders from Kycilia to monitor Challia.
Comoli Harcourt (コモリ・ハーコート, Komori Hākōto)
Voiced by: Akane Fujita (Japanese); Cat Protano (English)
A second lieutenant in the Principality of Zeon military, and a graduate of an elite military school. She is a part of the mission to find Char Aznable and the Red Gundam, though she holds suspicion to much of Challia's actions.
Rassit (ラシット, Rashitto)
Voiced by: Saya Hirose (Japanese); Alyson Leigh Rosenfeld (English)
A lieutenant colonel of the Principality of Zeon military. She is the captain of the Sodon.
Kowal (コワル, Kowaru)
Voiced by: Yuji Murai (Japanese); Eddy Lee (English)
A lieutenant in the Principality of Zeon military, he serves as a technical officer aboard the Sodon.
Tangi (タンギ)
Voiced by: Takayuki Nakatsukasa (Japanese); Daniel Walton (English)
A sergeant major of the Principality of Zeon military, he is the helmsman of Sodon.
Osillo (オシロ, Oshiro)
Voiced by: Genta Nakamura (Japanese); A.J. Beckles (English)
A sergeant in the Principality of Zeon military. He is one of Sodon's operators.
Sepha (セファ, Sefa)
Voiced by: Risa Watanabe (Japanese); Jessica DiCicco (English)
A corporal in the Principality of Zeon military. She is one of Sodon's operators.
Benowa (ベノワ)
Voiced by: Akinori Egoshi (Japanese); Jon Allen (English)
A corporal in the Principality of Zeon military. He is Sodon's communications officer.
Simus Al Bakharov (シムス・アル・バハロフ, Shimusu Aru Baharofu)
Voiced by: Umeka Shōji (Japanese); Sarah Natochenny (English)
A captain in the Principality of Zeon military, she is involved in the development of Psycommu weapons and is a close ally to Challia.

==== Other personnel ====
Char Aznable (シャア・アズナブル, Shaa Azunaburu) / Casval Rem Deikun (キャスバル・レム・ダイクン, Kyasubaru Remu Daikun)
Voiced by: Yuuki Shin (Japanese); Kyle McCarley (English)
A lieutenant commander later promoted to colonel in the Principality of Zeon military, the original pilot of the gMS-α Red Gundam, and a famed veteran of the One Year War, who was known under the moniker "The Red Comet". He originally plotted to kill the Zabi family and leave Zeon and the Federation in ruins after the war, but he disappeared mysteriously during the final battle of the conflict.
Kycilia Zabi (キシリア・ザビ, Kishiria Zabi)
Voiced by: Kaori Nazuka (Japanese); Allegra Clark (English)
A major general of the Principality of Zeon military, and commander of the Mobile Assault Force. In the original series, she is assassinated during the final battle of the One Year War by Char, who accomplishes his goal of killing the Zabi family. With Char's disappearance in GQuuuuuuX's timeline, however, she survives the war and resides in the lunar city of Granada, though she remains wary of the motives of her brother Gihren, the Supreme Commander of Zeon.
Denim (デニム, Denimu)
Voiced by: Kōsuke Gotō (Japanese); Chris Okawa (English)
A sergeant major in the Principality of Zeon military. In U.C. 0079, he piloted a Zaku alongside Char during the assault of Side 7.
Dren (ドレン, Doren)
Voiced by: Taichi Takeda (Japanese); Major Attaway (English)
A lieutenant of the Principality of Zeon military, who later got promoted to captain. He was Char's adjutant.
Mulligan (マリガン, Marigan)
Voiced by: Soma Saito (Japanese); Eddy Lee (English)
A captain in the Principality of Zeon military. A subordinate of Kycilia.
Flanagan (フラナガン, Furanagan)
Voiced by: Hiroshi Shirokuma (Japanese); Major Attaway (English)
A scientist who founded the Flanagan Institute, the Principality of Zeon's Newtype research facility.
Gaia (ガイア)
Voiced by: Yōji Ueda (Japanese); Brent Mukai (English)
A former captain in the Principality of Zeon military, he made a name for himself during the One Year War as part of the Black Tri-Stars alongside Ortega and Mash. He participated in a Clan Battle under the entry name of GGG.
Ortega (オルテガ, Orutega)
Voiced by: Kenji Hamada (Japanese); Jason Charles Miller (English)
A former lieutenant in the Principality of Zeon military, he was a member of the Black Tri-Stars who fought in the One Year War. He participated in a Clan Battle under the entry name of OOO.
Atharv (アサーヴ, Asāvu)
Voiced by: Koki Uchiyama (Japanese); Isaac Robinson-Smith (English)
A lieutenant in the Principality of Zeon military and Kycilia's aide.
Miguel Serveto (ミゲル・セルベート, Migeru Serubēto)
Voiced by: Taku Yashiro (Japanese); Kevin Andrew Rivera (English)
A second lieutenant in the Principality of Zeon military. A pilot who graduated from Flanagan School and was a classmate of Xavier.
M'Quve (マ・クベ, Ma Kube)
Voiced by: Tomokazu Sugita (Japanese); Kamran Nikhad (English)
A colonel in the Principality of Zeon Army. He serves under the command of Kycilia Zabi in the Mobile Assault Force. He later becomes a lieutenant general in the Principality of Zeon Army.
Uragang (ウラガン, Uragan)
Voiced by: Taiki Yamashita (Japanese); Jason Charles Miller (English)
A second lieutenant in the Principality of Zeon army. M'Quve's adjutant.
Tokwan (トクワン, Tokuwan)
Voiced by: Hiroo Sasaki (Japanese); Earl Baylon (English)
A captain in the Principality of Zeon military and pilot of the Rick Dom.
Leo Lionni (レオ・レオーニ, Reo Reōni)
Voiced by: Nobuyuki Hiyama (Japanese); James Sie (English)
Development manager of Yomagn'tho.
Tirza Lionni (ティルザ・レオーニ, Tiruza Reōni)
Voiced by: Rena Maeda (Japanese); Julie Nathanson (English)
Daughter of Leo Lionni, the development manager of Yomagn'tho.

=== Earth Federation ===
Paolo Cassius (パオロ・カシアス, Paoro Kashiasu)
Voiced by: Hiroshi Naka (Japanese); Chris Okawa (English)
A lieutenant colonel in the Earth Federation Forces. He was captain of the Pegasus-class ship White Base. He is killed by Char after Char captured the White Gundam, and he later steals the ship for Zeon.
Tem Ray (テム・レイ, Temu Rei)
Voiced by: Kosuke Echigoya (Japanese); Scott Williams (English)
The chief engineer of the Earth Federation's Operation V project, which developed the RX-78-02 White Gundam mobile suit.
Shiiko Sugai (シイコ・スガイ)
Voiced by: Manami Hanawa (Japanese); Brianna Knickerbocker (English)
A former Earth Federation ace pilot who shot down over 100 enemy mobile suits during the One Year War. Her reputation and skill earned her the nickname of "The Witch". She holds an obsession with taking down the Red Gundam in battle, regardless of who its current pilot is, after her MAV was killed by the mobile suit during the war. She battles under the entry name MAMAMAJO (ママ魔女).
Bocata (ボカタ, Bokata)
Voiced by: Ai Kaneta (Japanese); Shara Kirby (English)
An employee of the Dormitory Security Company, former Earth Federation pilot, and Shiiko's MAV. She battles under the entry name HAL (ハル).
Mosk Han (モスク・ハン, Mosuku Han)
Voiced by: Yasuhiro Kikuchi (Japanese); Scott Williams (English)
He is currently employed at the Dormitory Security Company, and is a former technical officer in the Earth Federation Forces.
Deux Murasame (ドゥー・ムラサメ, Dū Murasame)
Voiced by: Hisako Kanemoto (Japanese); Ari Thrash (English)
A second lieutenant in the Earth Federation Forces and a Cyber-Newtype, she is affiliated with the Murasame Institute, an Earth Federation Newtype research facility.
Gates Capa (ゲーツ・キャパ, Gētsu Kyapa)
Voiced by: Ayumu Murase (Japanese); Kieran Regan (English)
A lieutenant in the Earth Federation Forces and a Cyber-Newtype, he is affiliated with the Augusta Institute Newtype research facility and works as Deux's handler.
Bask Om (バスク・オム, Basuku Omu)
Voiced by: Hiroki Yasumoto (Japanese); Earl Baylon (English)
A Major in the Earth Federation Forces, who is organizing a far-right special forces.

=== Side 6/Izuma Colony ===
Arraga (アラガ, Araga)
Voiced by: Masato Niwa (Japanese); Alex Bankier (English)
A military police officer of Side 6. A pilot of the Military Police Zaku.
Raggucci (ラゴウチ, Ragouchi)
Voiced by: Yoshimitsu Shimoyama (Japanese); Erik Braa (English)
A military police officer of Side 6. Like Arraga, he pilots a military police Zaku.
Tamaki Yuzuriha (タマキ・ユズリハ)
Voiced by: Rie Kugimiya (Japanese); Jennifer Sun Bell (English)
An employee of Side 6's Audit Bureau and Amate's mother. Her husband is a diplomat, currently working away from home in another colony, and she worries about Amate's future.
Ward (ワード, Wādo)
Voiced by: Hiroshi Yanaka (Japanese); Major Attaway (English)
A military and police detective from Side 6.
Chaichi (チャイチ)
Voiced by: Katsumi Fukuhara (Japanese); Jon Allen (actor) (English)
A Side 6 military and police detective, and Ward's partner.
Mahko Nagawara (マーコ・ナガワラ, Māko Nagawara)
Voiced by: Tetsu Inada (Japanese); Erik Braa (English)
The boss who makes Nyaan act as an illegal courier.
Cameron Bloom (カムラン・ブルーム, Kamuran Burūmu)
Voiced by: Kazuyuki Okitsu (Japanese); Ryan Colt Levy (English)
Side 6's presidential advisor.

=== Earth ===
Lalah Sune (ララァ・スン, Rarā Sun)
Voiced by: Hina Yōmiya (Japanese); Anjali Kunapaneni (English)
A woman who works as a prostitute at Kabas Estate. She sees visions of a life she never had.
Vani (ヴァーニ, Vāni)
Voiced by: Yui Ogura (Japanese); Kimberly Woods (English)
A girl who works as a maid in Kabas Estate. She adores Lalah.
Kanchana (カンチャナ)
Voiced by: Hana Hishikawa (Japanese); Bindy Coda (English)
A girl who works as a maid at Kabas Estate with Vani. She respects Lalah.

=== Other ===
Endymion Unit (エンディミオン・ユニット, Endimion Yunitto)
Voiced by: Tōru Furuya (Japanese); Lucien Dodge (English)
Also known as Omega Psycommu System, it is a mysterious system created from OOParts (out-of-place parts) recovered by the Principality of Zeon similar to the Rose of Sharon and installed inside the GQuuuuuuX. It only responds to people whose were strong willed to pilot the Gundam and is designed to independently create Zeknova phenomenons. During the final battle, the Endymion Unit fully awakens due to Machu's resolve to protect the Rose of Sharon from Shuji, which resulted to his defeat as the unit laments that it doesn't want to see Lalah getting killed by the Gundam once more.

== Production ==
The series was first unveiled during the "Gundam Conference Winter 2024" livestream in December 2024, revealing the series' official trailer. It marked the first Gundam production to be co-produced by Studio Khara, and was largely creatively led by staff who once worked for Gainax on several anime such as Neon Genesis Evangelion, FLCL, and Diebuster. Although the degree of the involvement of Khara founder and president Hideaki Anno, credited as GQuuuuuuX's co-writer, has been debated, mechanical designer Ikuto Yamashita clarified that Kazuya Tsurumaki served as the primary director of the project, and Anno's role was limited to providing production support.

Planning of the show began in 2018. Khara had previously collaborated with Sunrise on in-between animation and other support, such as on the last episode of Mobile Suit Gundam Unicorn. As part of production, Tsurumaki was given freedom by Sunrise to offer up new approaches.

The show is considered by Sunrise as "a representative work heading into the 45th and 50th anniversaries of Gundam," which prompted the release of a theatrical cut, titled Mobile Suit Gundam GQuuuuuuX: Beginning (Japanese: 機動戦士Gundam GQuuuuuuX -Beginning-, Hepburn: Kidō Senshi Gandamu Jīkuakusu: Biginingu), to create a "festive element" around the Khara and Sunrise collaboration.

== Media ==
=== Anime ===
The series was directed by Kazuya Tsurumaki with series composition by Yoji Enokido, episode scripts by Enokido and Hideaki Anno, and features original character designs by Take and mechanical designs by Ikuto Yamashita. A theatrical cut by Bandai Namco Filmworks and Toho premiered on January 17, 2025, and MX4D and 4DX versions were screened in Japanese theaters from February 22 of the same year. The theatrical prologue is licensed by GKIDS, with the North American premiere held on February 20 at the Japan Society in New York City, before being more widely released in North American theaters starting February 28 of the same year. In Australia and New Zealand, it was released in cinemas by Sugoi Co on February 27, 2025, with a special fan premiere event being held in both Sydney and Melbourne on February 24. A re-release through Sugoi Co was held at Hoyts Broadway as part of the GUNDAM BASE Pop-Up World Tour on October 2, 2025, alongside re-releases of Mobile Suit Gundam SEED Freedom and a special 4K remaster release of Gundam Wing: Endless Waltz.

The TV series aired from April 9 to June 25, 2025, on all NNS affiliate stations, including Nippon TV. (Note: Nippon TV listed the series premiere as airing on April 8 at 24:29, which is effectively April 9 at 12:29 a.m. JST.) The opening theme song is "Plazma", performed by Kenshi Yonezu, while the ending theme song is "Mō Dō Natte mo Ii ya", performed by Hoshimachi Suisei, which premiered in an abridged version as an insert theme for Beginning; for the eleventh episode, the ending theme song is "Beyond the Time ~Möbius no Sora wo Koete~", performed by TM Network, which originally served as the ending theme for Mobile Suit Gundam: Char's Counterattack. Hoshimachi and superduo Nomelon Nolemon would also respectively perform the songs "Yoru Ni Saku" (夜に咲く; lit. 'Bloom in the Night'), and "Midnight Reflection" (ミッドナイト・リフレクション), "Kienai" (きえない; lit. 'Afterimage'), and "Halo" as additional insert songs. Amazon Prime Video licensed the series for worldwide streaming. A simultaneously released English dub of the series was produced by NYAV Post.

==== Episodes ====
| No. | Title | Directed by (Note: Production staff information is taken from the ending credits of each episode.) | Written by | Storyboarded by | Character animation directed by (Note: Animation direction for non-mechs) | Original release date |
|---|---|---|---|---|---|---|
| 0 | "Beginning" | Kazuya Tsurumaki, Daizen Komatsuda & Tōko Yatabe | Yoji Enokido & Hideaki Anno | Kazuya Tsurumaki, Hideaki Anno, Mahiro Maeda & Tōko Yatabe | Hidenori Matsubara, Mayumi Nakamura & Syūichi Iseki | January 17, 2025 |
A compilation film of the first three episodes and the first half of the eighth episode of the series
| 1 | "The Red Gundam"; Transliteration: "Akai Gandamu" (Japanese: 赤いガンダム) | Kazuya Tsurumaki | Yoji Enokido | Kazuya Tsurumaki | Yumi Ikeda & Fumie Kobori | April 9, 2025 |
Five years after the One Year War, Challia Bull, the former subordinate of ace pilot Char Aznable, leads a Principality of Zeon task force aboard the warship Sodon pursuing Char's Red Gundam, which has mysteriously reappeared, to the Izuma colony of Side 6. On Izuma, student Amate Yuzuriha has a run in with the smuggler Nyaan and ends up encountering the underground Clan Battle team Pomeranians. During that time, Challia sends Xavier Olivette to capture the Red Gundam in the Gundam GQuuuuuuX, an experimental mobile suit equipped with the Psycommu, a brain-computer interface control system designed for use by Newtypes. Both Gundams end up fighting inside the colony itself, causing the local military police to respond, resulting in much destruction. Xavier, however, has difficulty activating the Psycommu and is forced to abandon it. Angered at the police's abuse of power, Amate commandeers the GQuuuuuuX, with the Psycommu activating in her presence, and disables their mobile suits while the Red Gundam escapes. Challia suspects it is not being piloted by Char, and wonders on the identity of its new pilot.
| 2 | "The White Gundam"; Transliteration: "Shiroi Gandamu" (Japanese: 白いガンダム) | Daizen Komatsuda | Hideaki Anno | Hideaki Anno, Mahiro Maeda & Kazuya Tsurumaki | Hidenori Matsubara | April 16, 2025 |
In the midst of the One Year War, Char leads an assault on Side 7 and steals two of the Earth Federation's secret weapons: the White Gundam mobile suit and the warship White Base, which Zeon renames as the Red Gundam and Sodon respectively. Char takes on the Red Gundam as his personal mobile suit, and has an experimental Psycommu control device installed in it upon discovering his Newtype abilities. He also recruits Challia, who is another Newtype, to be his wingman. Despite major losses against the Federation following the theft, Zeon regains the upper hand as the war enters its final weeks. As a last resort, the Federation sends the captured Solomon asteroid base on a collision course with the Zeon-controlled Granada lunar city. Char takes part in a mission to divert Solomon, but the Psycommu malfunctions and swallows Char and part of Solomon in a ball of light, diverting it and leading the phenomenon to be dubbed the "Zeknova". Afterwards, the Federation sues for peace and withdraws from space, while Challia starts his search for Char and the Red Gundam, bringing him to Side 6.
| 3 | "Machu in Clan Battle"; Transliteration: "Kuranbatoru no Machu" (Japanese: クランバトルのマチュ) | Tōko Yatabe | Yoji Enokido | Kazuya Tsurumaki & Tōko Yatabe | Mayumi Nakamura | April 23, 2025 |
Fascinated by the vision she saw when the Psycommu activated and craving for freedom from a lackluster life in Izuma, Amate agrees to join the Pomeranians as a Clan Battle pilot under the alias "Machu". She later encounters Shuji Ito, the current pilot of the Red Gundam, and they agree to work together as MAVs for the upcoming Clan Battle. Meanwhile, Xavier is apprehended by the Side 6 authorities and harshly interrogated. Challia flies the Sodon directly into Izuma as a show of force and intimidates the colony into releasing Xavier. During the Clan Battle, the inexperienced Amate initially has difficulty fighting the opposing team, but her newly manifested Newtype abilities grant her superhuman situational awareness and allow her to telepathically coordinate with Shuji and they secure victory. Challia and Xavier watch the battle as it is being streamed and are shocked to see both Gundams working together, prompting Challia to also become interested in the GQuuuuuuX's pilot.
| 4 | "The Witch's War"; Transliteration: "Majo no Sensō" (Japanese: 魔女の戦争) | Tetsurō Araki | Yoji Enokido | Tetsurō Araki & Kazuya Tsurumaki | Syūichi Iseki | April 30, 2025 |
Shuji reveals that he and the Red Gundam desire to head to Earth using the money he earns from Clan Battle, a sentiment Amate agrees with. Amate later wonders on Shuji's intent to visit Earth, during which a sleeping Shuji mentions he is searching for a rose. Shiiko Sugai, a former Federation ace pilot known as "The Witch", meets the Pomeranians after learning of the Red Gundam's appearance in Izuma, and challenges them to a Clan Battle to exact revenge despite having settled down to civilian life. Piloting the Gundam-esque Gelgoog mobile suit with her Clan Battle MAV, she becomes obsessed with defeating the Red Gundam, and begins ruthlessly attacking Shuji with technology and techniques that rival even Newtype reaction speed. Shuji brings Shiiko and Amate into an ethereal plane where Shiiko reveals somebody is communicating to Shuji through the Red Gundam, before she is killed by Shuji when he destroys her cockpit alongside her MAV. Witnessing this, a horrified Amate realizes the lengths Shuji would be willing to go to achieve his dream.
| 5 | "Nyaan Doesn't Know About Kira-Kira"; Transliteration: "Nyaan wa Kira-Kira o Shiranai" (Japanese: ニャアンはキラキラを知らない) | Kohei Kuratomi | Yoji Enokido | Mahiro Maeda & Kazuya Tsurumaki | Hiroyuki Honda, Hiroyuki Terao, Takayoshi Watanabe, Mebae & Rie Nakajima | May 7, 2025 |
Gaia and Ortega, two members of the Black Tri-Stars, plan to enter Clan Battle to earn money and settle their jealousy for the Red Gundam. Xavier decides to search for the GQuuuuuuX himself, though he is warned by a Zeon informant to be wary of Challia's true motives. He comes across Amate and Nyaan as they head for their next Clan Battle, and recognizes Amate. When Nyaan is accosted by a police officer who asks for her identification, Amate assaults the officer and she and Nyaan flee. Xavier corners and detains Amate in order to prove her identity as the pilot, reasoning that the Pomeranians would be forced to forfeit if she does not arrive in time to pilot the GQuuuuuuX. Nyaan decides to secretly take her place. Nyaan and Shuji fight Gaia and Ortega, who quickly gain the upper hand due to Nyaan's inexperience and Shuji being debilitated by a fever. However, Nyaan's frustration causes her Newtype powers to manifest and she and Shuji kill Gaia and Ortega. After the battle ends, Amate escapes Xavier, distraught as her Newtype connection with Shuji is no longer special. She is later shocked to learn that Nyaan was piloting the GQuuuuuuX.
| 6 | "The Plot to Assassinate Kycilia"; Transliteration: "Kishiria Ansatsu Keikaku" (Japanese: キシリア暗殺計画) | Motoki Nakanishi | Yoji Enokido | Kazuhiro Takamura & Kazuya Tsurumaki | Aoi Yamaguchi | May 14, 2025 |
Amate begins avoiding Nyaan after the Clan Battle due to her jealousy. After observing the GQuuuuuuX's recent performance, Challia arranges for the delivery of a Kikeroga mobile armor. Xavier is warned by his informant that both Zeon and Side 6 are on edge amid fears of Supreme Commander Gihren Zabi or the Federation interfering in the upcoming arrival of Gihren's sister Kycilia to Izuma for a summit. Since Challia has ties to Gihren, Xavier is reminded to further monitor him as Kycilia's mole. Later, Pomeranians leader Annqi brokers a deal with Challia on returning both Gundams and revealing Shuji's location after spying on Amate in exchange for a large bounty, during which Challia asks about the pilot of the GQuuuuuuX. Amate overhears Annqi's plans and reluctantly works with Nyaan to plan their escape to Earth with Shuji. Meanwhile, Federation agents and Cyber-Newtypes Gates Capa and Deux Murasame infiltrate Izuma on orders from Bask Om with the intent to assassinate Kycilia. Side 6 authorities try to murder Xavier as a warning to Zeon, but he is rescued by Challia, leaving Xavier to wonder about his next move as Kycilia arrives at the colony.
| 7 | "Machu's Rebellion"; Transliteration: "Machu no Riberion" (Japanese: マチュのリベリオン) | Shinnosuke Itō | Yoji Enokido | Mahiro Maeda & Kazuya Tsurumaki | Mamoru Otake & Shūta Osabe | May 21, 2025 |
Kycilia meets with Side 6 representatives to seek funding for the Yomagn'tho Solar Ray project and grows suspicious with the increased military police presence in Izuma. Meanwhile, Nyaan pilots the GQuuuuuuX and joins Shuji to fight Gates and Deux, the latter piloting a smuggled Psycho Gundam mobile armor, as the Cyber-Newtypes cause destruction in their mission to kill Kycilia. Amate tries to steal the Clan Battle prize money, but flees when Annqi calls her out on her recklessness and warns her dangerous predicament. Nyaan abandons the plan and asks Shuji to run away without Amate, as the Red Gundam unleashes another Zeknova and disappears, taking Shuji with it. Xavier defends Kycilia from Gates and Deux, and Challia kills the Cyber-Newtypes with his Kikeroga, proving his loyalty to Kycilia. Amate is branded as a fugitive by Side 6 and attempts to escape in the GQuuuuuuX, which starts responding to her frustrations, until she is subdued by Challia. He takes Amate and the GQuuuuuuX into his custody and begins planning to assassinate both Kycilia and Gihren to prevent a civil war, while Xavier finds Nyaan and invites her to serve under Kycilia.
| 8 | "Falling on the Moon"; Transliteration: "Tsuki ni Ochiru" (Japanese: 月に墜 (堕) ちる (Note: Rendered in the credits as 月に墜ちる and 月に堕ちる per respective A / B segments)) | Daizen Komatsuda (A) | Hideaki Anno (A) | Kazuya Tsurumaki | Hidenori Matsubara (A) | May 28, 2025 |
| 8 | "Falling on the Moon"; Transliteration: "Tsuki ni Ochiru" (Japanese: 月に墜 (堕) ちる) | Tōko Yatabe (B) | Yoji Enokido (B) | Kazuya Tsurumaki | Mayumi Nakamura (B) | May 28, 2025 |
During the divert of Solomon Char tries to sabotage the operation, when he is distracted by a Federation mobile suit piloted by his sister Artesia and becomes trapped in the collapsing asteroid base. Challia overhears Char talking to someone before Solomon is engulfed by the first Zeknova, while Kycilia is notified a test subject held by Granada codenamed the "Rose of Sharon" vanished. In the present, Nyaan is escorted around Granada by Xavier, who introduces her to classmate Miguel Serveto and the Gundam GFreD mobile suit. Nyaan learns its previous pilots were killed prior to testing and is informed by Xavier of the distrust between Kycilia and Gihren. They accuse Miguel of being a spy for Gihren behind the mysterious deaths. Miguel explains it is to prevent the GFreD from turning its pilots into "Diablos", when the GFreD's Psycommu responds to Nyaan's presence and kills him. Kycilia learns of the incident and strives to further train Nyaan in her goal to activate Yomagn'tho and replicate the Zeknova, as Xavier tells Nyaan about the GQuuuuuuX's escape to Earth. Meanwhile, an engineer named Shirouzu converses a researcher on Kycilia's projects and the search for the Rose of Sharon as they travel to Yomagn'tho.
| 9 | "The Rose of Sharon"; Transliteration: "Sharon no Bara" (Japanese: シャロンの薔薇) | Kohei Kuratomi | Yoji Enokido & Hideaki Anno | Shinpei Sawa & Kazuya Tsurumaki | Rie Nakajima | June 4, 2025 |
Challia interrogates Amate on the whereabouts of the Rose of Sharon based on Shuji's description. Amate receives help from an unknown benefactor and uses it to escape the Sodon in the GQuuuuuuX, which Challia notices and orders his crew to monitor and follow her to the Rose of Sharon. She crashes near Mangaluru and is taken to a brothel to recover. Amate learns from the brothel's maids that a woman is expecting her arrival. The woman introduces herself as Lalah Sune, and she shares her visions of falling in love with a Zeon officer wearing a red uniform who freed her and seeing him die at the hands of a Federation soldier piloting a white mobile suit, whom she also loved. Amate asks Lalah to escape the brothel with her, but Lalah refuses as she continues to wait for the Zeon officer. Amate flies to the ocean to retrieve the GQuuuuuuX and finds a mobile armor and an unconscious woman resembling Lalah in its cockpit, which Amate realizes is the Rose of Sharon. Challia and the Sodon then fly in to recapture her and collect the mobile armor for Kycilia, as Challia remarks it did not come from their world.
| 10 | "Yomagn'tho Blockade"; Transliteration: "Iomagunu'sso Fūsa" (Japanese: イオマグヌッソ封鎖) | Morihito Abe | Yoji Enokido | Iwao Teraoka & Kazuya Tsurumaki | Kyōko Kotani, Hiroo Nagao, Yumiko Nakamura & Shuichi Shimamura | June 11, 2025 |
With Yomagn'tho nearing completion, Zeon conducts preparations for its opening. Challia confides in Amate on his disillusionment with Zeon during the One Year War and how Char's ambitions resonated with him, before telling Amate to follow her own desires. Kycilia meets Gihren and his entourage, where she criticizes Gihren's inaction following her assassination attempt. As they call Kycilia out on her cowardice, Gihren and his entourage are poisoned and killed by her. Kycilia takes control of Yomagn'tho and attacks Gihren's forces, with Xavier and Nyaan leading. Nyaan heads inside Yomagn'tho's core on a special mission from Kycilia, during which she remembers her lecture on strength and survival. In the midst of the chaos, Shirouzu escapes. Realizing that he underestimated Kycilia, Challia and Amate deploy to stop Yomagn'tho. Nyaan controls the Rose of Sharon with the GFreD and aims Yomagn'tho at the Zeon base of A Baoa Qu, where it releases a massive Zeknova that pulls the base and destroys it, killing its garrison before vanishing. Amate becomes furious at the Rose of Sharon's use for destruction and confronts the GFreD, demanding to know its pilot.
| 11 | "Alphacide"; Transliteration: "Arufa Koroshi-tachi" (Japanese: アルファ殺したち) | Shinnosuke Itō | Yoji Enokido | Yutaka Uemura & Kazuya Tsurumaki | Mizuki Itō & Takayuki Nakao | June 18, 2025 |
Nyaan recoils in pain from operating the Rose of Sharon when she is confronted by the GQuuuuuuX. During their duel, Nyaan realizes the GQuuuuuuX is being piloted by Amate. Amate questions Nyaan's decision to join Zeon and declares she will protect Lalah inside the Rose of Sharon. Inside Yomagn'tho, Shirouzu is cornered by Kycilia, who exposes him as being Char and implores him to join her side. Amate and Nyaan interrupt their confrontation after being guided by Shuji, and Char flees with Amate. Char reveals he had given the Red Gundam to Shuji and resolves on making the Rose of Sharon disappear to prevent further chaos using the Red Gundam. Nyaan starts doubting Kycilia's goals when she sees Kycilia preparing to kill Amate, prompting Nyaan to shoot Kycilia and escape in the GFreD. Amate reluctantly fights Char, as Shuji intervenes and a Zeknova forms from the Psycommu of the Rose of Sharon and the Red Gundam resonating with each other. Shuji pulls Amate and Char into an ethereal plane and states his desire to protect Lalah, revealing he comes from a different universe. Shuji announces he must destroy their world as a white mobile suit is summoned from his universe.
| 12 | "That's Why I..."; Transliteration: "Dakara Boku wa..." (Japanese: だから僕は…) | Kazuya Tsurumaki, Tōko Yatabe & Daizen Komatsuda | Yoji Enokido | Kazuya Tsurumaki | Syūichi Iseki, Mayumi Nakamura & Hidenori Matsubara | June 25, 2025 |
Char activates Yomagn'tho's true function to send the Rose of Sharon back to her own universe just as Shuji's mobile suit enters. Amate demands to know Shuji's motive, prompting a vision: the Rose of Sharon's Lalah, unable to save Char from death, creates alternate universes from despair. Witnessing Char's rejection of Lalah in their world, Shuji resolves to kill her to spare her further suffering. The Sodon identifies Shuji's mobile suit as a Gundam known as the "White Devil". Amate joins forces with Nyaan to protect Lalah, while Char kills Kycilia and is attacked by Challia, who fears Char may doom humanity. Shuji's Gundam proves dominant, nearly destroying the Rose of Sharon, but Amate halts him. She pleads for Lalah's agency, and Shuji relents, moved by Amate's conviction and Newtype strength. He kisses her before Lalah awakens, thanks Amate, and releases a Zeknova that engulfs herself, Shuji, and Yomagn'tho before vanishing. Char escapes as Xavier urges Challia to help reshape Zeon for Newtypes. Later, Artesia assumes leadership of Zeon. Char reunites with his world's Lalah. Amate and Nyaan relax on a beach on Earth, with Amate hopeful that she will be able to see Shuji again.

==== Home media ====
In Japan, the series was released on three Blu-ray and DVD volumes by Emotion from January 28 to March 25, 2026, with the Beginning film releasing on May 27th with a Ultra HD Blu-ray release also being available.

=== Merchandise ===
Alongside other merchandise releases, the series is also part of the long-running Gunpla line of plastic model kits by Bandai Spirits. Kits based on the Mobile Suits in the series were released in 1/144 scale, with the first model being released in January 2025.

== Reception ==
=== Beginning ===
The compilation film cut, Mobile Suit Gundam GQuuuuuuX: Beginning, was generally praised by critics for its visual style, characters, writing, and its narrative remixing of the original Mobile Suit Gundam. (Note: Attributed to multiple references:)

The introduction featuring Char Aznable and showing the divergence in the Universal Century timeline central to GQuuuuuuX's narrative was appreciated for its audiovisual and tonal fidelity to the original series. James Whitbrook of Gizmodo praised the reuse of the original's soundtrack and audio cues alongside the faithful recreation of its scenes and set pieces, saying it recontextualized these elements "in fascinating ways to fit its alternative rendition of events where Char is suddenly the protagonist of this familiar narrative." Richard Eisenbeis of Anime News Network felt similarly, positively comparing the conceit to alternate universe fan fiction and saying it was a fresh direction for Gundam, calling it "a blast on its own". Eisenbeis additionally praised the original story and new characters, saying that the combination of the "pure fanservice" of the introduction and the new story made Beginning a cathartic experience for fans of the original series while remaining accessible to first-time Gundam viewers. In contrast, Kambole Campbell of Polygon felt that the dependence on the original series made GQuuuuuuX "probably not the best Gundam to start with", but nonetheless appreciated the film's prologue, calling it a "delightful throwback". Aftermath's Isaiah Colbert also enjoyed the divergent premise, describing it as "watching Studio Khara and Sunrise play with their toys". Juan Barquin of IGN said the prologue functioned as "a loose history lesson that preps the uninitiated viewer" for GQuuuuuuX's new story.

The visual style of GQuuuuuuX was noted for its combination of the audiovisual elements of the original series and its new characters and setting, described by Eisenbeis as "shifting naturally from one generation to the next". Campbell also liked the mix of the two, praising the "brightly colored and more cartoonish" approach to familiar elements of the UC continuity. Barquin felt similarly, comparing the visuals to character designer Take's past work on the Pokémon franchise, as well as previous works produced by Gainax, and said that the marriage of the two styles "not once" was jarring, "instead emphasizing the way life and culture has progressed in the years since the war ended". Colbert also liked the style, saying the aesthetics switching from the "grainy, retro look" of 0079 to "the sleek, vibrant, and bouncy mix of 3D and 2D animation of today's anime" was engaging. While Campbell praised Yamashita's mechanical designs, he felt that the CG animated mech battles were "more of an intrusion", preferring the 2D-animated fights of The Witch from Mercury. In contrast, Barquin considered the mech action to possess "a real fluidity", though also acknowledged that the CG use made them "a stark contrast" to Witch from Mercury. Whitbrook praised the visual style as "a boldly colorful, poppy sci-fi aesthetic".

The characters and apparent themes of GQuuuuuuX were also generally liked, with critics generally eager to see more of the narrative and character development in the series proper. Campbell, Barquin, and Whitbrook all expressed an interest in the narrative premise of following the cast living under the rule of the Principality of Zeon, which was described as "fascistic" and a "police state". Whitbrook compared the premise of GQuuuuuuX to Zeta Gundam, describing it as "imagining what life looks like in a post-war world for the generation that came of age after its conclusion" and described Amate, Nyaan and Shuji as believable young people attempting to navigate the setting.

=== Television series ===
The television broadcast received broadly positive coverage for its remix of Universal Century canon and its willingness to juxtapose retro audiovisual cues with contemporary pacing. Polygon called the show "an explosive collision of the franchise's past and present," while noting that prior UC familiarity made its callbacks land more strongly and that the CG-heavy mobile suit battles divided opinion compared with The Witch from Mercury. Weekly episode coverage from Gizmodo highlighted a midseason turning point that "complicated" the series' alternate-timeline remix and praised how character stakes escalated alongside lore reveals, while the site's finale analysis described the ending as a "poignantly hopeful" statement that Gundam can move beyond cyclical war while still feeling like Gundam. Aftermath likewise praised the climax while arguing that its metatext and emotional payoffs land best if viewers "do their anime homework," reflecting ongoing debate over the series' approachability for newcomers. Mainstream press and fans also tracked weekly momentum through Prime Video's global release, with commentary emphasizing the show's high-contrast visual style, Yamashita's mechanical designs, and strong voice performances, even as opinions split on the CG presentation of large-scale battles.

In Japan, week-to-week coverage of the TV broadcast was generally positive, though some debate centered on how heavily it assumed prior knowledge of the Universal Century. GAME Watch's finale review described the series as a "what-if war chronicle packed with fan favorites," while also providing supplemental explanations for viewers less familiar with Zeta Gundam-era context. Differences between the terrestrial TV broadcast and the Amazon Prime Video streaming version also became a point of discussion. For example, Episode 8 included altered dialogue in the streaming edition, and the finale (Episode 12) was released on Prime Video in an extended 29-minute cut—around four minutes longer than the TV broadcast. Coverage in mainstream entertainment outlets highlighted the show's social-media traction, noting that the casting of prominent voice actors from the original Mobile Suit Gundam became a trending topic immediately after the finale aired.

Outside Japan, English-language outlets leaned more positive on the TV run's thematic "remix" and its finale's tone, while still flagging the same onboarding hurdles and CG/2D debate. Polygon and Gizmodo emphasized the show's bold interplay of nostalgia and reinvention and repeatedly noted that the experience is richer for long-time UC viewers; Aftermath argued the finale "lands" best with prior series knowledge, capturing the international consensus that the series is rewarding but not the easiest entry point.

=== Accolades ===
| Year | Award | Category | Recipient(s) | Result | Ref. |
|---|---|---|---|---|---|
| 2025 | Newtype Anime Awards | Best Work (TV/Streaming) | Mobile Suit Gundam GQuuuuuuX | 2nd place | |
| 2025 | Newtype Anime Awards | Best Work (Theatrical) | Mobile Suit Gundam GQuuuuuuX – Beginning | 2nd place | |
| 2025 | Newtype Anime Awards | Best Mascot Character | Haro | Won | |
| 2025 | Newtype Anime Awards | Best Director | Kazuya Tsurumaki | Won | |
| 2025 | Newtype Anime Awards | Best Scripts | Yoji Enokido and Hideaki Anno | Won | |
| 2025 | Newtype Anime Awards | Best Mechanical and Prop Design | Ikuto Yamashita and Se Jun Kim | Won | |
| 2025 | Abema Anime Trend Awards | Japan Anime Trend Award | Mobile Suit Gundam GQuuuuuuX | Won | |
| 2025 | Yahoo! Japan Search Awards | Anime Category | Mobile Suit Gundam GQuuuuuuX | Won | |
| 2026 | Tokyo Anime Award Festival | Animation of the Year | Mobile Suit Gundam GQuuuuuuX | Won | |
| 2026 | Tokyo Anime Award Festival | Best Music | Kenshi Yonezu | Won | |
| 2026 | 10th Crunchyroll Anime Awards | Best Original Anime | Mobile Suit Gundam GQuuuuuuX | Nominated | |
| 2026 | Music Awards Japan | Best Soundtrack Album | Mobile Suit Gundam GQuuuuuuX Original Soundtrack | Nominated | |
| 2026 | Music Awards Japan | Best Original Score for Cinema | Yoshimasa Terui and Masayuki Hasuo for Mobile Suit Gundam GQuuuuuuX – Beginning | Nominated | |
| 2026 | Japan Expo Awards | Daruma for Best Anime | Mobile Suit Gundam GQuuuuuuX | Nominated | |
| 2026 | Japan Expo Awards | Daruma for Best Action Anime | Mobile Suit Gundam GQuuuuuuX | Nominated | |
| 2026 | Japan Expo Awards | Daruma for Best Opening | "Plazma" by Kenshi Yonezu | Nominated | |

== See also ==
- Mobile Suit Gundam École du Ciel – A manga series also set in U.C. 0085, albeit in the original Universal Century timeline, that features a lead female protagonist

| Preceded by Gundam: Requiem for Vengeance; Mobile Suit Gundam Silver Phantom | Gundam metaseries (production order); 2025 | Succeeded by Mobile Suit Gundam: Iron-Blooded Orphans Urdr Hunt |
