= Koku =

Chinese-based Japanese unit of volume

The koku (斛) is a Chinese-based Japanese unit of volume. One koku is equivalent to 10 to (斗) or approximately 180 litres (40 imp gal; 48 US gal), (Note: 180 litres (4.9 imp bsh; 5.1 US bsh)) or 150 kilograms (330 lb) of rice. It converts, in turn, to 100 shō and 1,000 gō. One gō is the traditional volume of a single serving of rice (before cooking), used to this day for the plastic measuring cup that is supplied with commercial Japanese rice cookers.

The koku in Japan was typically used as a dry measure. The amount of rice production measured in koku was the metric by which the magnitude of a feudal domain (han) was evaluated. A feudal lord was only considered daimyō class when his domain amounted to at least 10,000 koku. As a rule of thumb, one koku was considered a sufficient quantity of rice to feed one person for one year. (Note: A koku of brown rice (unpolished rice) weighs about 150 kilograms (330 lb). White rice (milled rice, polished rice) weighs about the same (150g per gō). But 1 koku of brown rice would only yield 0.91 koku of milled rice (white rice) after processing (seimai (精米)), i.e., removing the rice bran).) (Note: Apparently 1.8 koku (1 koku and 8 to) was actually required for nourishment by a man each year, according to the conventional wisdom documented in a "home code" (kakun) of a certain merchant family in the Edo period.)

The Chinese equivalent or cognate unit for capacity is the shi or dan (Chinese: 石; pinyin: shí, dàn; Wade–Giles: shih, tan) also known as hu (斛; hú; hu), now approximately 103 litres but historically about 59.44 litres (13.07 imp gal; 15.70 US gal).

== Chinese equivalent ==
The Chinese 石 dan is equal to 10 dou (斗; dǒu; tou) "pecks", 100 sheng (升; shēng; sheng) "pints". While the current dan is 103 litres in volume, the dan of the Tang dynasty (618–907) period equalled 59.44 litres.

The character 斛 hu was used interchangeably with 石 before the Tang dynasty. Since the Song dynasty, it has been an independent unit equal to half a dan.

== Modern unit ==
The exact modern koku is calculated to be 180.39 litres, 100 times the capacity of a modern shō. (Note: By definition. 1 koku = 10 to = 100 shō.) (Note: Each shō was determined to measure 1803.9 cubic centimetres (millilitres) or 1.803906 litres.) This modern koku is essentially defined to be the same as the koku from the Edo period (1600–1868), (Note: The Edo Period koku was roughly 180 litres or 5 bushels.) namely 100 times the shō, equal to 64,827 cubic bu in the traditional shakkanhō measuring system. (Note: Weights and Measures Act (Japan) (1891).)

=== Origin of the modern unit ===
The kyō-masu (京枡; "Kyoto masu"), the semi-official one shō measuring box since the late 16th century under Daimyo Nobunaga, began to be made in a different (larger) size in the early Edo period, sometime during the 1620s. Its dimensions, given in the traditional Japanese shaku length unit system, were 4 sun 9 bu square times 2 sun 7 bu depth. (Note: sun = 1/10 shaku and bu = 1/100 shaku respectively.) Its volume, which could be calculated by multiplication was:

1 koku = 100 shō = 100 × (49 bu × 49 bu × 27 bu) = 100 × 64,827 cubic bu (Note: Also =100 × 64.827 cubic sun.)

Although this was referred to as shin kyō-masu or the "new" measuring cup in its early days, its use supplanted the old measure in most areas in Japan, until the only place still left using the old cup ("edo-masu") was the city of Edo, and the Edo government passed an edict declaring the kyō-masu the official nationwide measure standard in 1669 (Kanbun 9).

=== Modern measurement enactment ===
When the 1891 Japanese Weights and Measures Act was promulgated, it defined the shō unit as the capacity of the standard kyo-masu of 64827 cubic bu. The same act also defined the shaku length as 10/33 metre. The metric equivalent of the modern shō is 2401/1331 litres. The modern koku is therefore 240,100/1331 litres, or 180.39 litres.

The modern shaku defined here is set to equal the so-called setchū-shaku (setchū-jaku or "compromise shaku"), measuring 302.97 mm, a middle-ground value between two different kane-jaku standards. (Note: Between the common people's Matashiro-jaku, 302.37 mm and the bakufu's official Kyōho-jaku 303.36 mm. The matashirō-jaku 又四郎尺 devised by a carpenter is a type of the carpentry scale was the commoner's type of kane-jaku/kyoku-jaku/magari-jaku (曲尺).) A researcher has pointed out that the (shin) kyō-masu cups ought to have used take-jaku which were 0.2% longer. (Note: One type of take-jaku is the aforementioned Kyōho-jaku which came into use in the Kyoho era (1716-1736).) However, the actual measuring cups in use did not quite attain the take shaku metric, and when the Japanese Ministry of Finance had collected actual samples of masu from the masu-za (measuring-cup guilds) of both eastern and western Japan, they found that the measurements were close to the average of take-jaku and kane-jaku.

=== Lumber koku ===
The "lumber koku" or "maritime koku" is defined as equal to 10 cubic shaku in the lumber or shipping industry, compared with the standard koku measures 6.48 cubic shaku. A lumber koku is conventionally accepted as equivalent to 120 board feet, but in practice may convert to less. In metric measures 1 lumber koku is about 278.3 litres (61.2 imp gal; 73.5 US gal).

== Historic use ==
The exact measure now in use was devised around the 1620s, but not officially adopted for all of Japan until the Kanbun era (1660s).

=== Feudal Japan ===
Under the Tokugawa shogunate (1603–1868) of the Edo period of Japanese history, each feudal domain had an assessment of its potential income known as kokudaka (production yield) which in part determined its order of precedence at the Shogunal court. The smallest kokudaka to qualify the fief-holder for the title of daimyō was 10,000 koku (worth ¥705.53 million (2016) (equivalent to ¥783.62 million or US$5.18 million in 2024)) and Kaga han of the Maeda clan, the largest fief (other than that of the shōgun), was called the "million-koku domain". Its holdings totaled around 1.025 million koku (worth ¥72.3 billion (2016) (equivalent to ¥80.3 billion or US$530.52 million in 2024)). Many samurai, including hatamoto (a high-ranking samurai), received stipends in koku, while a few received salaries instead.

The kokudaka was reported in terms of brown rice (genmai) in most places, with the exception of the land ruled by the Satsuma clan which reported in terms of unhusked or non-winnowed rice (momi (籾). Since this practice had persisted, past Japanese rice production statistics need to be adjusted for comparison with other countries that report production by milled or polished rice.

Even in certain parts of the Tōhoku region or Ezo (Hokkaidō), where rice could not be grown, the economy was still measured in terms of koku, with other crops and produce converted to their equivalent value in terms of rice. The kokudaka was not adjusted from year to year, and thus some fiefs had larger economies than their nominal koku indicated, due to land reclamation and new rice field development, which allowed them to fund development projects.

==== As measure of cargo ship class ====
Koku was also used to measure how much a ship could carry when all its loads were rice. Smaller ships carried 50 koku (7.5 tonnes, 7.4 long tons, 8.3 short tons) while the biggest ships carried over 1,000 koku (150 tonnes, 150 long tons, 170 short tons). The biggest ships were larger than military vessels owned by the shogunate.

== In popular culture ==
The Hyakumangoku Matsuri (Million-Koku Festival) in Kanazawa, Japan celebrates the arrival of daimyō Maeda Toshiie into the city in 1583, although Maeda's income was not raised to over a million koku until after the Battle of Sekigahara in 1600.

== In fiction ==
The James Clavell novel Shōgun uses the koku measure extensively as a plot device by many of the main characters as a method of reward, punishment and enticement. While fiction, it shows the importance of the fief, the rice measure and payments.
