= Plazma (song) =

2025 single by Kenshi Yonezu

Single by Kenshi Yonezu
- Language: Japanese
- A-side: "Bow and Arrow"
- Released: January 20, 2025
- Genre: J-pop; dance-pop; anison
- Length: 3:00
- Label: Sony Music Labels
- Songwriter: Kenshi Yonezu
- Producer: Kenshi Yonezu

Kenshi Yonezu singles chronology
"Azalea" (2024)	"Plazma" / "Bow and Arrow" (2025)	"Iris Out" / "Jane Doe" (2025)

Music videos
- "Plazma" on YouTube

"Plazma" is a song recorded and produced by Japanese singer-songwriter Kenshi Yonezu. Released digitally on January 20, 2025, "Plazma" serves as the opening theme song for the Japanese anime series Mobile Suit Gundam GQuuuuuuX. The song was later issued as a double A-sided CD on June 11, 2025 as his 15th CD single alongside "Bow and Arrow" via Sony Music Labels.

== Background ==
"Plazma" and "Bow and Arrow" was Yonezu's first physical release in 10 months since his sixth studio album, Lost Corner, and his first physical single release since his 14th single "Spinning Globe".

The CD maxi-single was released in four formats: a "Haro version" with packaging based on the character Haro from Mobile Suit Gundam GQuuuuuuX, an "installer device version" with a bonus DVD, and two single-disc "regular versions" with different jacket covers and track order. All packaging designs except for the regular version were supervised by Yonezu himself. To commemorate the release of the maxi-single, Medalist creator Tsurumaikada unveiled an illustration of the main characters from both series.

== Commercial performance ==
The maxi-single hit number 1 on Oricon's Weekly Singles chart and the Billboard Japan Hot 100 for the week of June 18, 2025.

== Accolades ==
Awards and nominations for "Plazma"
Ceremony	Year	Award	Result	Ref.
Anime Grand Prix	2026	Best Theme Song	10th place	
Japan Expo Awards	2026	Daruma for Best Opening	Nominated	
Japan Gold Disc Award	2026	Song of the Year by Download (Japan)	Won	
Japan Gold Disc Award	2026	Best 3 Songs by Download	Won	
Reiwa Anisong Awards	2026	Best Work Award	Nominated	
Reiwa Anisong Awards	2026	Lyrics Award (Note: Kenshi Yonezu credited as nominee.)	Nominated	

== Track listing ==
All tracks are written by Kenshi Yonezu.

"Plazma/Bow and Arrow" CD maxi-single
No.	Title	Length
1.	"Plazma"	3:01
2.	"Bow and Arrow"	2:57
3.	"Plazma" (anime opening ver.)	1:32
4.	"Bow and Arrow" (anime opening ver.)	1:29
Total length:		9:00

"Bow and Arrow/Plazma" CD maxi-single
No.	Title	Length
1.	"Bow and Arrow"	2:56
2.	"Plazma"	3:02
3.	"Bow and Arrow" (anime opening ver.)	1:31
4.	"Plazma" (anime opening ver.)	1:30
Total length:		9:00

"Installer Device" DVD
No.	Title	Length
1.	"Plazma" (music video)
2.	"Mobile Suit Gundam GQuuuuuuX" (non-credit opening)
3.	"Mobile Suit Gundam GQuuuuuuX" (promotion reel)
4.	"Mobile Suit Gundam GQuuuuuuX" (official trailer)
5.	"Bow and Arrow" (music video)
6.	"Bow and Arrow" (music video, Yuzuru Hanyu short program ver.)
7.	"Medalist" (non-credit opening)

== Charts ==
=== Weekly charts ===
Weekly chart performance for "Plazma"
Chart (2025)	Peak position
Global 200 (Billboard)	160
Japan Hot 100 (Billboard)	1
Japan Hot Animation (Billboard Japan)	1
Japan (Oricon) with "Bow and Arrow"	1
Japan Combined Singles (Oricon) with "Bow and Arrow"	1
Japan Anime Singles (Oricon) with "Bow and Arrow"	1
South Korea Download (Circle)	135

=== Monthly charts ===
Monthly chart performance for "Plazma"
Chart (2025)	Position
Japan (Oricon) with "Bow and Arrow"	4
Japan Anime Singles (Oricon) with "Bow and Arrow"	2

=== Year-end charts ===
Year-end chart performance for "Plazma"
Chart (2025)	Position
Japan (Japan Hot 100)	10
Japan Hot Animation (Billboard Japan)	5
Japan (Oricon) with "Bow and Arrow"	31
Japan Combined Singles (Oricon) with "Bow and Arrow"	5

== Certifications ==
Certifications for "Plazma"
Region	Certification	Certified units/sales
Japan (RIAJ) Physical	Platinum	250,000^{^}
Japan (RIAJ) Digital	Gold	100,000^{*}
Japan (RIAJ) Streaming	Platinum	100,000,000^{†}
^{*} Sales figures based on certification alone.^{^} Shipments figures based on certification alone.^{†} Streaming-only figures based on certification alone.
