= Mō Dō Natte mo Ii ya =

2025 anime song by Hoshimachi Suisei

Single by Hoshimachi Suisei
- Language: Japanese
- English title: "I Don't Care"
- Released: April 10, 2025
- Genre: J-pop; Anison
- Length: 3:23
- Label: Cover Corp; Sony Music Entertainment Japan
- Composers: Yuki Tsujimura; Naoki Itai
- Lyricist: Yuki Tsujimura
- Producer: Naoki Itai

Hoshimachi Suisei singles chronology
"Orbital Period" (2025)	"Mō Dō Natte mo Ii ya" (2025)	"Yoru ni Saku" (2025)

Music video
- "Mō Dō Natte mo Ii ya" on YouTube

"Mō Dō Natte mo Ii ya" (もうどうなってもいいや; lit. "I Don't Really Care What Happens Anymore", alternatively titled "I Don't Care" in English), is a song by Japanese singer and virtual YouTuber Hoshimachi Suisei. Written by Yuki Tsujimura and produced by Naoki Itai, the song serves as the ending theme for the anime Mobile Suit Gundam GQuuuuuuX, Hoshimachi's first song to do so. The song was released by Cover Corp. and Sony Music Entertainment Japan on April 10, 2025; a ninety-second version initially served as an insert song for the anime's film cut Mobile Suit Gundam GQuuuuuuX: Beginning and was released on February 2, 2025.

== Reception ==
The song was selected by Japanese musician Koji Asano for his SBS show J-Pop Hub on April 16, 2025.

== Charts ==
=== Weekly charts ===
Weekly chart performance for "Mō Dō Natte mo Ii ya"
Chart (2025–2026)	Peak position
Japan (Oricon)	5
Japan Combined Singles (Oricon)	20
Japan Anime Singles (Oricon)	1
Japan Hot 100 (Billboard)	29
Japan Hot Animation (Billboard Japan)	8

=== Monthly charts ===
Monthly chart performance for "Mō Dō Natte mo Ii ya"
Chart (2026)	Position
Japan (Oricon)	25
Japan Anime Singles (Oricon)	3
