= Yōichi =

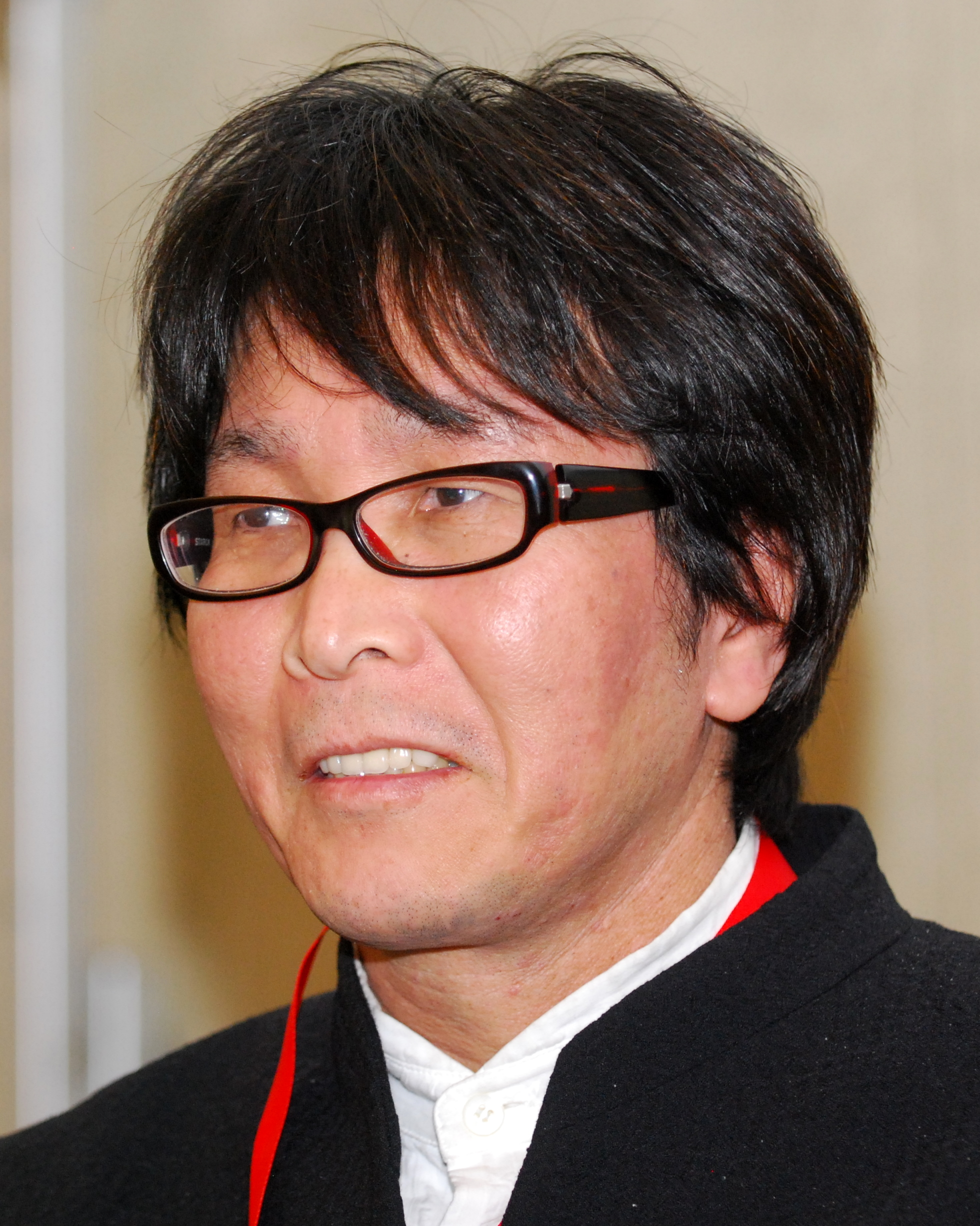
- Yoichi Takahashi, Japanese manga artist
- Pronunciation: joɯitɕi (IPA)
- Gender: Male

Origin
- Origin: Japanese
- Meaning: Different meanings depending on the kanji used

Other names
- Alternative spelling: Yoiti (Kunrei-shiki) Yoiti (Nihon-shiki) Yōichi, Yoichi, Youichi (Hepburn)

Yōichi, Yoichi, Youichi or Yohichi is a masculine Japanese given name.

== Written forms ==
Yōichi can be written using different combinations of kanji characters. Some examples:

- 洋一, "ocean, one"
- 陽一, "sunshine, one"
- 庸一, "common, one"
- 楊一, "willow, one"
- 耀一, "shine, one"
- 陽市, "sunshine, city"
- 耀市, "shine, city"
- 蓉一, "lotus, one"

The name can also be written in hiragana よういち or katakana ヨウイチ.

== Notable people with the name ==
- Yoichi Amano (天野 洋一; born 1981), Japanese manga artist
- Yoichi Asano (浅野 洋一), Japanese photographer
- Yoichi Doi (土肥 洋一; born 1973), Japanese footballer
- Yoichi Erikawa (襟川 陽一), Japanese video game producer
- Yoichi Futori (太 洋一; born 1982), Japanese footballer
- Yōichi Higashi (東 陽一; 1934–2026), Japanese film director
- Yoichi Iha (伊波 洋一, born 1952), Japanese politician
- Yoichi Kajiyama (梶山 洋一; born 1971), Japanese footballer
- Yoichi Kamimaru (神丸 洋一; born 1984), Japanese footballer
- Yoichi Kato (加藤 陽一; born 1976), Japanese volleyball player
- Yōichi Kobiyama (小檜山 洋一; born 1959), Japanese voice actor
- Yōichi Kotabe (小田部 羊一; born 1936), Japanese manga artist and animator
- Yoichi Komori (小森 陽一; born 1953), Japanese academic
- Yoichi Kuroda (黒田 洋一), Japanese environmentalist
- Yoichi Masukawa (増川 洋一; born 1978), Japanese voice actor
- Yoichi Masuzoe (舛添 要一; born 1948), Japanese politician
- Yoichi Midorikawa (緑川 洋一; 1915–2001), Japanese photographer
- Yoichi Miyaoka (宮岡 洋一), Japanese mathematician
- Yoichi Miyazawa (宮沢 洋一; born 1950), Japanese politician
- Yoichi Numata (沼田 曜一; 1924–2006), Japanese actor
- Yoichi Okamoto (1915–1985), American photographer
- Yoichi Sai (崔 洋一; 1949–2022), Japanese film director
- Yoichi Takabayashi (高林 陽一; 1931–2012), Japanese film director
- Yoichi Takahashi (高橋 陽一; born 1960), Japanese manga artist
- Yoichi Ueno (上野 陽一; 1883–1957), Japanese business theorist
- Yoichi Wada (和田 洋一; born 1959), Japanese chief executive

== Fictional characters ==
- Yoichi Hiruma (蛭魔 妖一), fictional American footballer, main character of Eyeshield 21
- Yoichi Isagi (潔 世一), fictional footballer, protagonist of Blue Lock

== See also ==
- 5176 Yoichi, a main-belt asteroid
