= Iris Out =

2025 single by Kenshi Yonezu

Single by Kenshi Yonezu
- A-side: "Jane Doe"
- Released: September 24, 2025
- Length: 2:32
- Label: SME
- Songwriter: Kenshi Yonezu
- Producer: Kenshi Yonezu

Kenshi Yonezu singles chronology
| "Plazma" / "Bow and Arrow" (2025) | "Iris Out" / "Jane Doe" (2025) | "1991" (2025) |

Music video
- "Iris Out" on YouTube

"Iris Out" (stylized in all caps) is a song recorded by Japanese singer-songwriter Kenshi Yonezu. Released digitally on September 15, 2025, via SME Records, "Iris Out" served as the opening theme song for the Japanese animated film Chainsaw Man – The Movie: Reze Arc. The song was later released physically on September 24, 2025, alongside "Jane Doe", the closing theme song, as a double A-side maxi single.

== Background ==
Kenshi Yonezu's single "Kick Back", used as the opening theme song for the anime adaptation of Chainsaw Man, saw global commercial success upon its release. Becoming the first song recorded in Japanese to receive a Gold certification from the Recording Industry Association of America (RIAA), "Kick Back" charted in various territories, including the Billboard Hot Rock & Alternative Songs chart, the UK Rock & Metal chart and the Canadian Hot 100.

In a press release on July 4, 2025, Kenshi Yonezu announced he recorded "Iris Out", the opening theme song for the Japanese animated film Chainsaw Man – The Movie: Reze Arc. On August 1, the release date of "Iris Out" was announced for September 24, as a double A-side single with an untitled song. The title for the untitled song was revealed on August 14, "Jane Doe", a collaboration single with Japanese-American singer Hikaru Utada. In a press release, "Jane Doe" was revealed as the ending theme song for the film.

== Release ==
"Iris Out" was digitally released on September 15, 2025. The song was later released physically on September 24, 2025, alongside "Jane Doe", as a double A-side single. Three variants were released: the regular edition, the Iris Out edition and the Jane Doe edition. The Iris Out variant includes an acrylic stand and a Polaroid photo of the character Reze from Chainsaw Man as bonus goods, while the Jane Doe version consists of a DVD of the "Kick Back" music video and a live performance video. First press bonuses for all variants include a serial number for a lottery in winning tickets to Yonezu's 2026 Ghost Tour.

== Music video ==
A music video was released on September 15, 2025, on Yonezu's official YouTube channel, using footage from the film. Billboard Japan reported that it contains some spoilers from the movie.

== Live performances ==
Like "Sayonara, Mata Itsuka!", Yonezu debuted the song at the 76th NHK Kōhaku Uta Gassen. The performance, which was recorded at the former Tokyo Expressway, starts with him in a telephone booth, listening to Hikaru Utada's chorus from his other single, Jane Doe. He then walks toward an LED catwalk, alongside female dancers. Approximately 100 dancers participated in the performance. During the transition between the first chorus and second verse, he travels in a shark vehicle. He finishes the performance with the girl group Hana, as they thank viewers and wish for a happy new year, while fireworks can be seen in the distance.

== Usage in media ==
"Iris Out" was also featured in the popular battle royale game Fortnite, where the audio was used as a "jam track" and users can purchase the song for 500 Vbucks.

== Accolades ==
Awards and nominations for "Iris Out"
| Ceremony | Year | Award | Result | Ref. |
|---|---|---|---|---|
| Abema Anime Trend Awards | 2025 | Anime Song Award | Won | |
| Anime Grand Prix | 2026 | Best Theme Song | 2nd place | |
| Crunchyroll Anime Awards | 2026 | Best Anime Song | Won | |
| Japan Gold Disc Award | 2026 | Best 3 Songs by Download | Won | |
| Japan Gold Disc Award | 2026 | Song of the Year by Streaming (Japan) | Won | |
| Japan Gold Disc Award | 2026 | Best 5 Songs by Streaming | Won | |
| MTV Video Music Awards Japan | 2026 | Song of the Year | Won | |
| Music Awards Japan | 2026 | Song of the Year | Nominated | |
| Music Awards Japan | 2026 | Top Global Hit from Japan | Nominated | |
| Music Awards Japan | 2026 | Best J-Pop Song | Won | |
| Music Awards Japan | 2026 | Best Anime Song | Nominated | |
| Music Awards Japan | 2026 | Top Japanese Song in Asia | Won | |
| Music Awards Japan | 2026 | Top Japanese Song in Europe | Won | |
| Music Awards Japan | 2026 | Top Japanese Song in North America | Won | |
| Music Awards Japan | 2026 | Top Japanese Song in Latin America | Won | |
| Reiwa Anisong Awards | 2026 | Best Work Award | Nominated | |

== Track listing ==
- Digital download and streaming
1. "Iris Out" – 2:32
- CD
1. "Iris Out" – 2:31
2. "Jane Doe" – 3:55
- Jane Doe DVD
1. "Chainsaw Man – The Movie: Reze Arc" (trailer) – 1:29
2. "Kick Back" (music video) – 3:39
3. "Kick Back" (live video) – 3:13
- 12" Single
1. "Iris Out"
2. "Jane Doe"
3. "Kick Back"
4. "Kick Back" (Frost Children remix)
5. "Kick Back" (Hudson Mohawke remix)
6. "Kick Back" (Tomggg remix)

== Personnel ==
- Kenshi Yonezu – vocals, production, programming, arrangement
- Masahito Komori – mixing, engineering
- Randy Merrill – mastering

== Charts ==
=== Weekly charts ===
Weekly chart performance for "Iris Out"
| Chart (2025–2026) | Peak position |
|---|---|
| Global 200 (Billboard) | 5 |
| Hong Kong (Billboard) | 5 |
| Japan (Japan Hot 100) | 1 |
| Japan Hot Animation (Billboard Japan) | 1 |
| Japan (Oricon) with "Jane Doe" | 2 |
| Japan Combined Singles (Oricon) with "Jane Doe" | 1 |
| Japan Anime Singles (Oricon) with "Jane Doe" | 1 |
| New Zealand Hot Singles (RMNZ) | 24 |
| South Korea (Circle) | 5 |
| South Korea Hot 100 (Billboard) | 13 |
| Singapore Regional (RIAS) | 27 |
| Taiwan (Billboard) | 2 |
| UK Singles Sales (OCC) | 12 |
| US World Digital Song Sales (Billboard) | 3 |

=== Monthly charts ===
Monthly chart performance for "Iris Out"
| Chart (2025) | Peak position |
|---|---|
| Japan (Oricon) with "Jane Doe" | 5 |
| Japan Anime Singles (Oricon) with "Jane Doe" | 1 |
| South Korea (Circle) | 5 |

=== Year-end charts ===
Year-end chart performance for "Iris Out"
| Chart (2025) | Position |
|---|---|
| Japan (Japan Hot 100) | 4 |
| Japan Hot Animation (Billboard Japan) | 2 |
| Japan (Oricon) with "Jane Doe" | 35 |
| Japan Combined Singles (Oricon) with "Jane Doe" | 3 |
| South Korea (Circle) | 106 |

== Certifications ==
Certifications for "Iris Out"
| Region | Certification | Certified units/sales |
|---|---|---|
| Japan (RIAJ) Physical with "Jane Doe" | Platinum | 250,000^{^} |
| Japan (RIAJ) Digital | Platinum | 250,000^{*} |
Streaming
| Japan (RIAJ) | 3× Platinum | 300,000,000^{†} |
^{*} Sales figures based on certification alone.^{^} Shipments figures based on certification alone.^{†} Streaming-only figures based on certification alone.

== Release history ==
Release history and formats for "Iris Out"
| Region | Date | Format | Version | Label | Ref. |
|---|---|---|---|---|---|
| Various | September 15, 2025 | Digital download; streaming | Digital | SME | |
| Japan | September 24, 2025 | CD | Standard | SME | |
| Japan | September 24, 2025 | CD | Iris Out | SME | |
| Japan | September 24, 2025 | CD; DVD | Jane Doe | SME | |
| Various | March 27, 2026 | 12" single | Vinyl | Milan | |
