= Asano Nagatake =

Head of Asano clan

Marquess Asano Nagatake
- 浅野 長武
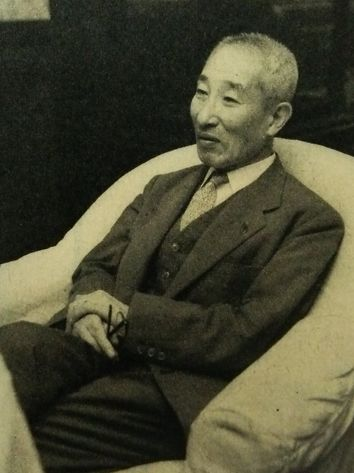
- Asano in 1956

Member of the House of Peers
- In office 28 December 1940 – 2 May 1947 Hereditary peerage

Personal details
- Born: 7 May 1895 Tokyo, Japan
- Died: 3 January 1969 (aged 73)
- Children: Asano Nagayoshi
- Parent: Asano Nagayuki (father)
- Education: Tokyo Imperial University

Asano Nagatake (7 May 1895 – 3 January 1969) was the 29th family head of the Asano clan, which ruled over Hiroshima Domain before 1871. He was an arts patron and museum administrator. He was director of the Tokyo National Museum in the 1950s and 1960s, and wrote a preface to the museum's catalog for Treasures from Japan, a touring exhibit, in 1955.

== Family ==
- Father: Asano Nagayuki
- Wives:
  - Princess Fushimi no Miya Yasuko (1898–1919), daughter of Prince Fushimi Hiroyasu
  - Princess Yamashina no Miya Yasuko (1901–1974), daughter of Prince Yamashina Kikumaro
- Children:
  - Asano Nagayoshi by Yamashina no Miya Yasuko
  - Marquis Yamashina Yoshimasa by Yamashina no Miya Yasuko
  - Yoriko married Tokugawa Kuninari of Mito-Tokugawa family by Yamashina no Miya Yasuko

Preceded by Asano Nagayuki	29th family head of the Asano clan of Hiroshima; 1940–1969	Succeeded by Asano Nagayoshi
