= Asano Nagayoshi =

Japanese politician

Asano Nagayoshi (1927–2007) was the 30th family head of the Asano clan, which ruled over Hiroshima Domain before 1871.

== Early life ==
Asano's parents were Asano Nagatake and Princess Yamashina no miya Yasuko, daughter of Prince Yamashina Kikumaro.

Preceded by Asano Nagatake	30th family head of the Asano clan of Hiroshima; 1969–2007	Succeeded by Asano Nagataka
