= Weights and Measures Act (Japan) =

First weights and measures regulations in modern Japan

The Weights and Measures Act (Japanese: 度量衡取締条例, Doryokori Shimarijorei) (Dajokan No. 135, August 5, 1875) were promulgated on August 5, 1875, and were the first weights and measures regulations in modern Japan. A weights and measures certification office was established in Wakayama by 1889. It was abolished with the enactment of the Weights and Measures Act in 1891. The act defined the shaku as the fundamental unit of length, and the kan as the fundamental unit of mass.

== See also ==
- Japanese units of measurement
