= Jane Doe (Kenshi Yonezu and Hikaru Utada song) =

2025 single by Kenshi Yonezu and Hikaru Utada

Single by Kenshi Yonezu and Hikaru Utada
- A-side: "Iris Out"
- Released: September 24, 2025
- Length: 3:56
- Label: SME
- Songwriter: Kenshi Yonezu
- Producers: Kenshi Yonezu; Yaffle

Kenshi Yonezu singles chronology
"Plazma" / "Bow and Arrow" (2025)	"Jane Doe" / "Iris Out" (2025)	"1991" (2025)

Hikaru Utada singles chronology
"Electricity" (2025)	"Jane Doe" (2025)	"Home" (2026)

Music video
- "Jane Doe" on YouTube

"Jane Doe" (stylized in all caps) is a song recorded by Japanese singer-songwriter Kenshi Yonezu and Japanese-American singer-songwriter Hikaru Utada. Released digitally on September 22, 2025, via SME Records, "Jane Doe" served as the closing theme song for the Japanese animated film Chainsaw Man – The Movie: Reze Arc. The song was later released physically on September 24, 2025, alongside "Iris Out", the opening theme song, as a double A-side maxi single.

== Background ==
In a press release on July 4, 2025, Kenshi Yonezu announced he recorded "Iris Out", the opening theme song for the Japanese animated film Chainsaw Man – The Movie: Reze Arc. Yonezu previously provided his song "Kick Back" as the opening theme song for the anime series of Chainsaw Man, which saw global success and later became the first song recorded in Japanese to receive a Gold certification from the Recording Industry Association of America (RIAA). On August 1, the release date of "Iris Out" was announced for September 24, as a double A-side single with an untitled song. The title for the untitled song was revealed on August 14, "Jane Doe", as a collaboration single with Japanese-American singer Hikaru Utada. In a press release, "Jane Doe" was revealed as the ending theme song for the film.

== Release ==
"Jane Doe" was released on September 24, 2025, alongside "Iris Out" as a double A-side single. Three variants were released: the regular edition, the Iris Out edition, and the Jane Doe edition. The Iris Out variant includes an acrylic stand and a Polaroid photo of the character Reze from Chainsaw Man as bonus goods, while the Jane Doe version consists of a DVD of the "Kick Back" music video and a live performance. First press bonuses for all variants include a serial number for a lottery in winning tickets to Yonezu's 2026 Ghost Tour.

== Music video ==
On September 23, a music video directed by Tomokazu Yamada was released on Yonezu's official YouTube channel.

== Accolades ==
Awards and nominations for "Jane Doe"
Ceremony	Year	Award	Result	Ref.
AnimaniA Awards	2026	Best Anime Song	Nominated	
Anime Grand Prix	2026	Best Theme Song	7th place	
Crunchyroll Anime Awards	2026	Best Anime Song	Nominated	
MTV Video Music Awards Japan	2026	Video of the Year	Nominated	
MTV Video Music Awards Japan	2026	Best Collaboration Video (Japan)	Won	
Music Awards Japan	2026	Top Global Hit from Japan	Nominated	
Music Awards Japan	2026	Best J-Pop Song	Nominated	
Music Awards Japan	2026	Best Anime Song	Nominated	
Music Awards Japan	2026	Top Japanese Song in Asia	Nominated	

== Track listing ==
- Digital download and streaming
1. "Jane Doe" – 3:56
- CD
1. "Iris Out" – 2:31
2. "Jane Doe" – 3:55
- Jane Doe DVD
1. "Chainsaw Man – The Movie: Reze Arc" (trailer) – 1:29
2. "Kick Back" (music video) – 3:39
3. "Kick Back" (live video) – 3:13
- 12" Single
1. "Iris Out"
2. "Jane Doe"
3. "Kick Back"
4. "Kick Back" (Frost Children remix)
5. "Kick Back" (Hudson Mohawke remix)
6. "Kick Back" (Tomggg remix)

== Personnel ==
- Kenshi Yonezu – vocals, production, programming, arrangement
- Hikaru Utada – vocals
- Yaffle – production, programming, arrangement
- Masahito Komori – mixing, engineering
- Yuya Saito – engineering
- Randy Merrill – mastering

== Charts ==
=== Weekly charts ===
Weekly chart performance for "Jane Doe"
Chart (2025)	Peak position
Global 200 (Billboard)	32
Hong Kong (Billboard)	5
Japan (Japan Hot 100)	2
Japan Hot Animation (Billboard Japan)	2
Japan (Oricon) with "Iris Out"	2
Japan Combined Singles (Oricon) with "Iris Out"	1
Japan Anime Singles (Oricon) with "Iris Out"	1
South Korea (Circle)	16
South Korea (Korea Hot 100)	35
Taiwan (Billboard)	3
US World Digital Song Sales (Billboard)	4

=== Monthly charts ===
Monthly chart performance for "Jane Doe"
Chart (2025)	Position
Japan (Oricon) with "Iris Out"	5
Japan Anime Singles (Oricon) with "Iris Out"	1
South Korea (Circle)	22

=== Year-end charts ===
Year-end chart performance for "Jane Doe"
Chart (2025)	Position
Japan (Japan Hot 100)	43
Japan Hot Animation (Billboard Japan)	11
Japan (Oricon) with "Iris Out"	35
Japan Combined Singles (Oricon) with "Iris Out"	3

== Certifications ==
Certifications for "Jane Doe"
Region	Certification	Certified units/sales
Japan (RIAJ) Physical with "Iris Out"	Platinum	250,000^{^}
Japan (RIAJ) Digital	Gold	100,000^{*}
Streaming
Japan (RIAJ)	2× Platinum	200,000,000^{†}
^{*} Sales figures based on certification alone.^{^} Shipments figures based on certification alone.^{†} Streaming-only figures based on certification alone.

== Release history ==
Release history and formats for "Jane Doe"
Region	Date	Format	Version	Label	Ref.
Various	September 22, 2025	Digital download; streaming	Digital	SME	
Japan	September 24, 2025	CD	Standard	SME	
Japan	September 24, 2025	CD	Iris Out	SME	
Japan	September 24, 2025	CD; DVD	Jane Doe	SME	
Various	March 27, 2026	12" single	Vinyl	Milan	
