= Rika Asano =

Japanese journalist

- 浅野 里香
- Born: January 7, 1994 (age 32); Tokyo, Japan
- Education: University of the Sacred Heart
- Occupations: announcer; television presenter
- Years active: 2016–present
- Employer: NHK
- Television: Bura Tamori co-host (2020–2022); Shutoken Network correspondent (2020–2023)
- Title: NHK Announcer
- Term: 2016–present
- Spouse: Undisclosed (m. 2023)

Rika Asano (浅野 里香, Asano Rika; born January 7, 1994) is an NHK announcer.

== Education ==
Asano was born in Tokyo, Japan. She graduated from the University of the Sacred Heart in Tokyo in March 2016, and was hired by NHK in April 2016.

== Career ==
She started her career at NHK Matsue Branch in Shimane Prefecture, and was moved to NHK Sapporo Branch in Sapporo, Hokkaido in 2018. She has been an anchor for Hokkaido's infotainment program Hokkaido Close-up since April 5, 2019. Also, she sometimes appears as correspondent in news programs broadcast from Hokkaido.

In March 2020, Asano was relocated to the Tokyo Announcement Room of NHK to host local news program Shutoken Network. She has been host for NHK's weekly geological program Bura Tamori since April 2020, taking over from Risa Hayashida.

On February 9, 2022, NHK announced that Asano was supposed to resign from the assistant job of Bura Tamori in April, from which she will be a host for Family History. She will still be a correspondent of Shutoken Network until 2023.

== Personal life ==
In January 2024, it was revealed that Asano was married to a general man last year. At the same time, she is expecting her first child.

== See also ==
- Tamori

Media offices
Preceded by Risa Hayashida	Bura Tamori 6th Co-Host; 2020–2022	Succeeded by Aoi Noguchi
