= Shirō Asano =

Shirō Asano may refer to:

- Shirō Asano (politician) (浅野 史郎, born 1948), Japanese university professor and former politician
- Shiro Asano (cameraman) (浅野 四郎, 1877–1955), cameraman in the early years of Cinema of Japan

== See also ==
- Shirō Sano (佐野 史郎, born 1955), Japanese actor
