= Tetsuo Asano =

Japanese computer scientist

Tetsuo Asano (浅野哲夫 (Asano Tetsuo), born 1949 in Kyoto Prefecture, Japan) is a Japanese computer scientist, the president of the Japan Advanced Institute of Science and Technology. His main research interest is in computational geometry.

== Education and career ==
Asano was a student at Osaka University, earning bachelor's, masters, and doctoral degrees there in 1972, 1974, and 1977. He was on the faculty of Osaka Electro-Communication University from 1977 until 1998, when he joined JAIST. From 2012 to 2014 he was dean of the School of Information Science at JAIST. He became president of JAIST in April 2014.

== Awards and honors ==
In 2001 he was elected as a fellow of the Association for Computing Machinery "for his contributions to discrete algorithms on computational geometry and their practical applications to computer vision and VLSI design." He is also a fellow of the Institute of Electronics, Information and Communication Engineers and of the Information Processing Society of Japan.

== Selected publications ==
- Asano, T.; Bhattacharya, B.; Keil, M.; Yao, F. (1988), "Clustering algorithms based on minimum and maximum spanning trees", Proceedings of the Fourth Annual Symposium on Computational Geometry (SCG '88), ACM, pp. 252–257, doi:10.1145/73393.73419, ISBN 978-0897912709, S2CID 5820268.
- Asano, Takao; Asano, Tetsuo; Guibas, Leonidas; Hershberger, John; Imai, Hiroshi (November 1986), "Visibility of disjoint polygons", Algorithmica, 1 (1–4): 49–63, doi:10.1007/BF01840436, S2CID 33957067
- Asano, Tetsuo; Ranjan, Desh; Roos, Thomas; Welzl, Emo; Widmayer, Peter (1997), "Space-filling curves and their use in the design of geometric data structures", Theoretical Computer Science, 181 (1): 3–15, doi:10.1016/S0304-3975(96)00259-9.
