= 2026 Music Awards Japan =

2026 music awards ceremony

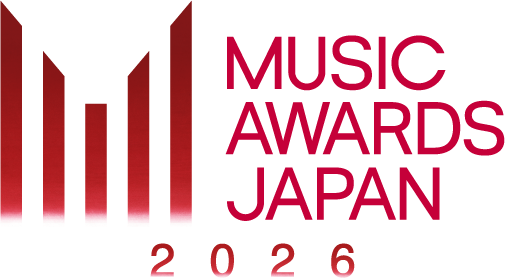
- Date: June 13, 2026
- Venue: SGC Hall Ariake (premiere ceremony); Toyota Arena Tokyo (grand ceremony)
- Country: Japan
- Hosted by: Kasumi Mori (premiere ceremony); Atsushi Yanaka (premiere ceremony); Masaki Suda (grand ceremony)
- Website: musicawardsjapan.com

Television/radio coverage
- Network: Tokyo MX (premiere ceremony); NHK (grand ceremony); Lemino; Abema; YouTube (globally)

2026 Music Awards Japan was held on June 13, 2026.

== Winners and nominees ==
List of winners and nominees for the main awards
Album of the Year	Artist of the Year
Fujii Kaze - Prema; Mrs. Green Apple - 10; Various Artist - Dear Jubilee: Radwimps Tribute; Gen Hoshino - Gen; Southern All Stars - Thank You So Much	Mrs. Green Apple; Hana; Sakanaction; Fujii Kaze; Kenshi Yonezu
Song of the Year	New Artist of the Year
Sakanaction - "Kaijū"; Hana - "Blue Jeans"; Kenshi Yonezu - "Iris Out"; Aina the End - "Kakumei Dōchū"; Milk - "Sukisugite Metsu!"	Hana; Candy Tune; Luv; Starglow; Brandy Senki
Top Global Hit from Japan	Best Song Asia
XG- "Hypnotize"; Kenshi Yonezu - "Iris Out"; Kenshi Yonezu and Hikaru Utada - "Jane Doe"; Lisa featuring Felix - "Reawaker"; Ado - "Usseewa"	Huntrix - "Golden"; Silent Open Up - "Tabola Bale"; Cup of Joe - "Multo"; Plave - "Dash"; Woodz - "Drowning"
Best J-POP Song
Kenshi Yonezu - "Iris Out"; Kenshi Yonezu and Hikaru Utada - "Jane Doe"; Aina the End - "Kakumei Dōchū"; Mrs. Green Apple - "Darling"; Kōji Tamaki - "ファンファーレ"
Best International Pop Song in Japan	Best International Rock Song in Japan
Lady Gaga - "Abracadabra"; Huntrix - "Golden"; Sabrina Carpenter - "Manchild"; Taylor Swift - "The Fate of Ophelia"; Shakira - "Zoo"	Green Day - "Smash It Like Belushi"; Wet Leg - "Catch These Fists"; Bon Jovi - "Red, White and Jersey"; Aerosmith and Yungblud - "My Only Angel"; Linkin Park - "Up From the Bottom"
Best International Hip Hop/Rap Song in Japan	Best International R&B/Contemporary Song in Japan
Tyler, the Creator - "Stop Playing with Me"; Doechii - "Anxiety"; Jennie featuring Doechii - "Extral"; Travis Scott - "Kick Out"; Drake - "Nokia"	Tyla - "Chanel"; The Weeknd - "Cry For Me"; Doja Cat - "Jealous Type"; Mariah Carey featuring Anderson .Paak - "Play This Song"; Thundercat - "Upside Down"
Best International Alternative Song in Japan	Best KPOP Song in Japan
Rosalía - "Reliquia"; Sombr - "12 to 12"; Haim - "Relationships"; Haim - "Take Me Back"; Lizzo - "Still Bad"; PinkPantheress - "Tonight"	Blackpink - "Jump"; Illit - "Almond Chocolate"; Le Sserafim - "Different"; Jennie - "Like Jennie"; Twice - "This Is For"
