= Yōichi Asano =

Japanese photographer

Yōichi Asano (浅野 洋一, Asano Yōichi; birth and death years unknown) was a renowned Japanese photographer, active in the 1930s.
