= Haro (character) =

Mascot of the Gundam anime franchise

- Mobile Suit Gundam character
- An image from the original anime of Haro below Amuro Ray's desk, watching him.
- First appearance: Mobile Suit Gundam (1979)
- Created by: Yoshiyuki Tomino; Hajime Yatate
- Voiced by: Japanese: Yo Inoue (Mobile Suit Gundam (1979)); Satomi Arai (Origin/Unicorn); Arisa Ogasawara (Celestial Being); English: Tabitha St. Germain; Stephanie Sheh (Origin/Unicorn); Robert Martin Klein

In-universe information
- Species: Tennis-like green balls consisting of metal plates
- Gender: Male
- Occupation: Guide; Companion
- Relatives: Amuro Ray (companion)

Haro (Japanese: ハロ, Hepburn: Haro) is the mechanical mascot of the Gundam science fiction anime franchise and has since become a mascot for the Sunrise studio as a whole, often appearing in their production logo since 2005.

== Overview ==
A Haro is a robot assistant used by various characters within the Gundam franchise. They are shaped like a ball consisting of metal plates and two red lights that function like eyes. Some of the plates can fold out, giving the Haro limited flight capability, while others can partially detach and function like limbs. Haros tend to say short sentences that they repeat for comedic effect.

=== Size ===
The Haros seen in the original Universal Century and the Advanced Generation timelines are roughly the size of a basketball, with the Anno Domini timeline's variations being slightly smaller. The Cosmic Era Haros are slightly smaller than a softball but larger than a baseball.

=== Human form ===
In Superior Defender Gundam Force, "Chief Haro" is the leader of the SDG, who wears a Haro helmet to mask his real identity. Though he cannot "fly" like his toy counterpart, his "wings" do flip up his cap at times.

== Story ==
=== Universal Century ===
The original Haro is a little robot companion built by the main character Amuro Ray. It is a cute testament to Amuro's exceptional talent for machines. Haro's features include a limited range of speech, and the ability to hover (in environments with atmosphere and low gravity) by flapping its ear-like appendage coverings. Haro can usually be found rolling behind Amuro's next door neighbor Fraw Bow. The ability to detect brain waves is also one of Haro's functions; in one of the episodes, Haro actually claimed that the brain wave of Amuro was lowered/different.

In Zeta Gundam, a mass-produced Mk-II version of Haro ends up in the hands of that series' main protagonist Kamille Bidan, who initially suspects it to be the original. He repairs the robot, only to have it constantly address him as Amuro.

During the events of Char's Counterattack, Amuro gives a "third-generation" Haro to Hathaway, the son of his captain Bright Noa.

In Mobile Suit Gundam Unicorn, the main character Banagher Links owns a replica of the original Haro, which was given to him by his father when he was young. Banagher has added unique improvements to his Haro.

In the manga Crossbone Gundam, conceptualised by Gundam creator Yoshiyuki Tomino, Berah Ronah has a robotic parrot named Haro, which refers to her as "Matilda-san". This seems to imply that her Haro is (or was made from the remains of) Amuro Ray's Haro, since it mistakes Berah for the redheaded Lieutenant Matilda Adjan, who appears in the original series, and in addition makes constant references to prior events and phrases in the UC timeline.

In Victory Gundam, the main character, Uso Ewin, has a Haro replica that he received from his father. Uso's Haro possesses a remarkably advanced artificial intelligence, and is even capable of controlling mobile suits, mimicking machine gun sounds, and projecting holographic images to intimidate the adversary.

In Mobile Suit Gundam GQuuuuuuX (which sets in a divergent timeline of the original Universal Century timeline), a grey Haro wearing a beanie is one of the Pomerians' Kaneban Co., Ltd robots which assists them in clan battles, and would later regularly accompany Amate Yuzuriha in the gMS-Ω GQuuuuuuX during clan battles (while implying that it becomes her companion).

=== Cosmic Era ===
Haro continues to permeate the Gundam franchise, having appeared in Gundam SEED as Lacus Clyne's multi-colored horde of simple-speech robot pets, built for her by Athrun Zala. These Haros are roughly 1/4 the size of their Universal Century counterparts and are similar in function, however a few possess certain abilities such as unlocking doors. Lacus' favorite Haro is a pink machine that she refers to as "Pink-Chan" (often translated as "Mr. Pink" or "Pinky"). Another notable Haro in Lacus's collection is "Navy-Chan", a navy blue robot on which she paints a mustache bearing a distinct resemblance the facial ornament of the ∀ Gundam of the CC (正歴 Seireki) calendar system. The rest of Lacus' Haros have been seen in yellow, orange, blue, green, and black. The parody comic Mobile Suit Gundam SEED Club Yonkoma states that Athrun has built a total of 35 Haros for Lacus.

In this continuity, Pink-chan often adds "omae moda" or "you too" to its sentences, depending on the language he is in (you too for the English translation, and vice versa), and often reasonlessly interjects with "Haro!" Pink-chan also often uses "Teyandei" (meaning "don't say a silly thing", a common reply in Manzai comedy) at seemingly random and nonsensical times. Pink-chan has also once said "damnit!" when he, along with Lacus, was returned to Athrun by Kira early in Gundam Seed.

In Gundam SEED Destiny, Lacus impersonator Meer Campbell is often seen with her own red Haro. Unlike other Haros, which speak Japanese, "Mister Red" speaks in English. However, in the English dub, (where Pink-chan and the rest of Lacus' Haros speak English), Mister Red speaks English with a Japanese accent.

=== Anno Domini ===
Orange and Purple Haros

In Mobile Suit Gundam 00, Celestial Being had produced unknown numbers of Haros as an assistant of daily maintenance works. At least six unique Haros have appeared in the animation production. The Haros in the series took much more maintenance and combat role than any other series' counterpart, usually seeing them operating with various machines, including mobile weapons.

The Haro which appears most is the Orange Haro, kept by the Gundam Meister Lockon Stratos, which accompanies him in the Gundam Dynames's cockpit, usually performing radar-like duties by detecting and warning Lockon of any incoming enemy units or attacks. In the event of close combat, Lockon's Haro is able to pilot his Gundam for him while he uses his sniper rifle, and control the additional shields that Dynames receives in episode 6. The Haro is returned to the Ptolemaios in Episode 24 after the destruction of Gundam Dynames. The Haro is later used in Cherudim Gundam's cockpit in season 2.

In episode 9, the four Haros address the orange Haro as "big brother"; their colors are blue, purple, red-violet, and dark green respectively. In episode 17, the orange Haro in turn addresses Nena Trinity's purple Haro, which was found in a wreck 80 years ago as "big brother". It might be suggested it is the prototype of the other Haros from the Celestial Being; that Haro is named "HARO" in official data, which named in English but not Japanese.

In episode 2 of the second season, a red-pink Haro is assigned to accompany with Saji Crossroad, who is initially detained by Celestial Being on Ptolemaios 2, and later used in 0-Raiser's cockpit to assist Saji, who has no experience using mobile weapons. It is unknown that if it was the same red-violet Haro appeared in first season, due to lighting issue.

From Fereshte, Hanayo, a manmade AI that is of the same model as Lockon's Haro that is yellow in colour appears to resemble a cat, since it has a tail and cat-like ears which are always flapping. A character that bears resemblance to Gundam Meister 874 is shown to be released from the inside of Hanayo as shown in the Gundam 00F manga.

The Haros that appear in Gundam 00 are 25 cm in diameter and are larger than Lacus Clyne's and Meer Campbell's Haros (about 10 cm in diameter), but smaller than Amuro Ray's.

=== Advanced Generation ===
The Haro in Mobile Suit Gundam AGE is created by main character Flit Asuno, later entrusted by him to his son Asemu, and inherited by his grandson Kio. Despite being similar to the UC Haros in color and size, this Haro appear to be extremely elastic, and has the ability to bounce as high as a mobile suit's cockpit. It can also be used as a portable computer/terminal when it opens itself, displaying a keyboard and screen.

=== Reguild Century ===
Gundam Reconguista in G has a Haro-like diagnostics robot named Nobell. It is named after the main character Bellri and his friend Noredo. It is referred to as a HAROBE-type robot.

=== Ad Stella ===
Mobile Suit Gundam: The Witch from Mercury has Haros used by numerous characters enrolled at Asticassia School of Technology and affiliated with the Benerit Group Corporation. Most are painted orange, though the most prominent Haro, owned by Rouji Chante, is instead green.

== In other media ==
=== Video games ===
In the game, Mobile Suit Gundam SEED Never Ending Tomorrow and the remaster Mobile Suit Gundam SEED Never Ending Tomorrow R, there is a special mode called "Haro Madness" where the player fights gigantic versions of "Pink-Chan", "Navy-Chan", and a green Haro. They have their own signature traits, and this mode is said to be one of the hardest in the entire game.

In the SD Gundam: G Generation series of tactical role-playing games, Haros frequently appear as secret units, generally ones of overwhelming power, such as the giant "Psycho Haro" of SD Gundam: G Generation Zero, which is easily capable of destroying an enemy fleet in a single turn. Another mission on G Generation Seed which the player had to defeat the Pink Haro.

In arcade fighting game Mobile Suit Gundam: EX Revue, when any player gets dizzy, Instead of stars there is Haro.

In the Super Robot Wars series of video games, Haros are rare equippable items, usually providing a large bonus to the equipping unit's stats or simply a sub-pilot of Usso Erwin (Mobile Suit V Gundam) or Lockon Stratos (Mobile Suit Gundam 00). Additionally, in the early Super Famicom installments, the various forms of AI that controlled many common enemy units were represented by portraits of Haro. Using Spirit Command Daunt (脱力) in other games than Original Generations will shown a green Haro (or Pink Haro in Super Robot Wars J) will spin around the target, causing the target to lose 10 Will Points (or some battle events will cause lose more than 10 Will Points without using Daunt). In the very early series (before 4), the AI units head icons are Haros, rather than computer chips.

In Harobots series developed by Sunrise Interactive, Haro is portrayed as trainer's pet.

In the Dynasty Warriors: Gundam series, enemies will occasionally drop power-ups resembling Haro with open wing flaps, which refills the player's health and special power bars to maximum. Also in Dynasty Warriors: Gundam 2, new objectives are signalled by a "Haro, haro" sound (the voice differs depending on region), and the Pink-chan Haro appears on the Game Over screen saying "Focus" (in the English version). One of the random Submissions that appears during the game's regular missions is Lacus asking the player to find and rescue Haro for her, Haro never speaks directly but if the mission is completed he asks Lacus to join the players side.

=== Toys and merchandise ===
In real life, Bandai released a series of Haro Capsule toys (called Haro Cap, different from the Gundam Haro Capsule sold by Broccoli USA) with different colours and painting, mostly showing a reference to icons of the Gundam universes. For example, one having the V-shaped antenna painted on the forehead(?) referencing RX-78-2 Gundam and one painted red with an antenna on the forehead as the MS-06S Zaku II, Char Aznable Custom.

Haro has been immortalized in a series of robotic toys called "1/4 scale Digital Hobby Series Mascot Robo". It was initially available in green. The "Haro Color" series was released later on, adding yellow, orange, navy blue and sky blue to the roster. These Haros are basically glorified alarm clocks that react to any nearby sound by rocking sideways, lighting up red eyes, creating robotic sounds, spewing Japanese phrases and/or flipping their "ears". If an alarm is set and time approaches, the Green Haro plays a tune (not the actual song) of Mobile Suit Gundam's OP theme, "Tobe! Gundam".

Years later, at the height of Gundam SEED's popularity, a 1/1 scale (the same size as the 1/4 scale) Pink Haro called "Haro 2" was released to coincide with popular character Lacus Clyne. The Pink Haro is more sensitive to sound than its predecessors, along with a light-detection sensor. When the ambiance changes from bright to dark (usually by casting a shadow over it by waving your hand), the Pink Haro will react in the same manner like the previous Haros, only noisier. If an alarm is set and the time approaches, it will keep saying Japanese phrases while flipping its ears and blinking its eyes. Pink Haro's voice in this toy was provided by the actor who dubbed its voice in the anime, Kotono Mitsuishi.

In February 2008, a "Gundam 00 Style Digital Hobby Series Mascot Robo" Haro, who represents Lockon Stratos' Orange Haro will be released as announced in the Plamo Radicon Show 2007. Pictures on the internet give the impression that the new Haro will be another 1/4 scale (making it the same size as the previous Haros). Unlike its Orange Haro ancestor of the "Haro Color" series released years ago, this Haro's reported features include two modes of play and an internal motion sensor to which it will react in the manner as its predecessors. It is yet unclear if previous features such as the alarm clock and the photo-sensitivity (that the Pink Haro had) would be included or if the actor Arisa Ogasawara (who dubs Haro's voice in Gundam 00) will provide the toy's speaking voice.

Through the years, Japanese videogame publisher and toy maker Banpresto as well as other companies have released countless Haro products due to the character's immense popularity as a Gundam "mascot". The merchandise includes T-shirts, wristbands, towels, circular or Haro-shaped calculators, room lights (including Planetarium-like lights and bath lights where you submerge Haro in water, activate him and he'll glow underwater), bath toys (a haro-shaped rubber duck that propels itself in water when activated), microphones and earphones, speakers, Haro-shaped CD players and cases, cell phone accessories, plush toys, cushions, and the short-lived "Haromatherapy" room freshener (pressing it makes Haro pop its ears and release scents to stimulate the olfactory senses).

The biggest and most expensive Haro product created was the infamous Haro desktop PC case. It weighs a heavy 5 kg and around 40 cm in diameter. It wasn't big enough to support all PCs: It was reported to carry relatively small computers like the Mac Mini. Only 1000 units were manufactured and it retailed for 99,800 yen. A very expensive piece, it was shunned and labelled as "a novelty product for Gundam fans only". The Haro PC case was controllable by remote but, unlike the 1/4 and 1/1 scale Haro toys, it cannot move sideways. Instead, it opens its "ears", takes out its hands and moves them back and forth while blinking its yellow eyes (instead of the conventional red) and speaking in an extremely loud voice.

=== Haro cameos ===
After the original Mobile Suit Gundam series was canceled, Tomino included a number of Haro cameos in his next series, Space Runaway Ideon:

- Episode 2 - a Haro appears in an exploding Solo colonist fighter (as a side note, this same footage is used in episode 18, but the Haro has been painted over).
- Episode 9 - a Haro can be seen as some dinosaurs explode.
- Episodes 7, 13 and 19 - a Haro can be seen rolling around on a table as the ship shakes.
- Episode 18 - a poster of Char Aznable is seen on a bedroom wall, a few seconds later as the room explodes a pair of Haro can be seen flying around the room.

In the animated movie Crusher Joe, Haro appears during several explosions near the end of the movie.
