= Koji Asano =

Japanese musician and composer

- Born: April 26, 1974 (age 52); Saitama, Japan
- Occupations: Musician, Composer
- Known for: Electroacoustic music

Koji Asano (born 26 April 1974 in Saitama, Japan) is a Japanese musician and composer. He works primarily in the field of electro-acoustic music, with his principal instrument being computer software. Although he is essentially a solo performer, he has also appeared in numerous ensembles, such as Ensemble Die Reihe, Paragon Ensemble, Smith Quartet, Barcelona Winds Orchestra, and the Koji Asano Ensemble. Besides a prolific string of albums and limited-edition CD-Rs, he has also composed music for video art, films, and theatrical performances.
